= Międzyrzec Boyars =

Historical ethnographic group of Polish people

Bojarzy Międzyrzeccy (Polish)

Regions with significant populations
- Poland (Podlaskie Voivodeship, Lublin Voivodeship) (historically)

Languages
- Polish (Masovian)

Religion
- Roman Catholicism

Related ethnic groups
- Poles, Masovians, Rusyns

Międzyrzec Boyars (Note: Polish: Bojarzy Międzyrzeccy) were an ethnographic group of Polish people, that in 19th century, inhabited the rural areas near Międzyrzec Podlaski, in the region of Podlachia, currently located at the border of the Podlaskie Voivodeship and the Lublin Voivodeship, Poland. They were a subgroup of Masovians. By the end of the 19th century, the group had assimilated into the rest of Polish people, losing its separate cultural identity.

== History ==
The group originated as Masovian peasants, who settled in the 19th century in the rural areas near Międzyrzec Podlaski, in the villages of Jelnica, Kożuszki, Krzymoszyce, Łuby, Łuniew, Misie, Pościsze, Przychody, Rzeczyca, Strzakły, and Wygnanka. They spoke Polish language and were of Roman Catholic faith. They were given land to settle in the area. In exchange, they had to provide horse riders for postal services and military, and pay the rent for the land. Their community was surrounded by the Rusyns, with Rusyn language influencing their dialect.

By the end of the 19th century, their regional culture, including traditional clothing, begun to disappear, as the group assimilated into the rest of Polish people, eventually fully losing its separate cultural identity.
