= Hermann Staiger =

German fighter ace and Knight's Cross recipient (1915–1964)

- Staiger as an Oberleutnant
- Born: 6 April 1915; Tennenbronn, German Empire
- Died: 22 June 1964 (aged 49); Freiburg, West Germany
- Military career
- Allegiance: Nazi Germany
- Branch: Luftwaffe
- Service years: 1935–1945
- Rank: Major (major)
- Units: JG 51, JG 26, JG 1, JG 7
- Commands: 7./JG 51, 12./JG 26, II./JG 1, II./JG 7
- Conflicts: World War II: Battle of France; Battle of Britain; Operation Barbarossa; Defense of the Reich
- Awards: Knight's Cross of the Iron Cross

Hermann Staiger (6 April 1915 – 22 June 1964) was a Luftwaffe ace and recipient of the Knight's Cross of the Iron Cross during World War II. The Knight's Cross of the Iron Cross, and its variants were the highest awards in the military and paramilitary forces of Nazi Germany during World War II. Staiger was credited with 63 aerial victories during World War II, 49 on the Western Front and 14 on the Eastern Front.

== Early life and career ==
Staiger was born on 6 April 1915 in Tennenbronn in the Grand Duchy of Baden as part of the German Empire. He joined the Luftwaffe in 1935 as an officer candidate. Following his flight training, (Note: Flight training in the Luftwaffe progressed through the levels A1, A2 and B1, B2, referred to as A/B flight training. A training included theoretical and practical training in aerobatics, navigation, long-distance flights and dead-stick landings. The B courses included high-altitude flights, instrument flights, night landings and training to handle the aircraft in difficult situations.) by September 1939 he was a Leutnant flying with 1. Staffel (1st squadron) of Jagdgeschwader 20 (JG 20—20th Fighter Wing). This was a wing in name only, being just a single Gruppe (Fighter Group) that had been set up just prior to the outbreak of war, in July 1939. His commanding officer was the Condor Legion veteran Walter Oesau.

== World War II ==
For the Polish campaign his unit was based at Sprottau, to protect the Silesian industrial area from Polish bombers. On 6 November, the Gruppe was moved to Döberitz where it remained until 21 February 1940. That day, I./JG 20 was ordered to Bönninghardt and placed under the control of the Stab of Jagdgeschwader 51 (JG 51—51st Fighter Wing). There, the Gruppe patrolled Germany's western border during the "Phoney War" period of World War II.

During the Battle of France on 29 May, following the German advance, I. Gruppe moved to Sint-Denijs-Westrem Airfield near Ghent in Belgium. Operating from Sint-Denijs on 31 May, the Gruppe engaged in aerial combat during the Battle of Dunkirk and claimed twelve aerial victories for the loss of two pilots killed in action. That day, Staiger claimed his first aerial victory, a Royal Air Force (RAF) Supermarine Spitfire fighter shot down northwest of Dunkirk, his only claim during the Battle of France.

Following the Armistice of 22 June 1940, the Luftwaffe continued to fight the RAF in the Battle of Britain. Staiger claimed his second aerial victory on 30 June. On a mission over the English Channel, he claimed a Bristol Blenheim bomber shot down 10 kilometers (6.2 miles) east of Saint-Omer. On 4 July, I. Gruppe of JG 20 was officially integrated into JG 51, becoming its III. Gruppe. In consequence, Staiger became a member of the 7. Staffel, a Staffel of III. Gruppe of JG 51. During a period of the battle of Britain referred to as Kanalkampf, Staiger claimed a Spitfire northwest of Cap Gris-Nez on 8 July, and a Blenheim 15 kilometers (9.3 miles) northeast of Deal on 11 July, and another Spitfire on 4 August in a location 10 kilometers (6.2 miles) southwest of Dover.

=== Squadron leader ===
On 24 August 1940, Oesau was given command of III. Gruppe of JG 51, replacing Hauptmann Hannes Trautloft in this capacity. In consequence, Staiger was given command of 7. Staffel as Staffelkapitän (squadron leader). On a fighter escort mission for Luftwaffe bombers heading to London, Staiger claimed two Spitfire fighters shot down on 7 September. On two further missions flown to London, he claimed a Hawker Hurricane fighter shot down near Dungeness on 14 September and another Hurricane the following day near Tonbridge, his last claims in 1940.

On 7 December, III. Gruppe was withdrawn from combat operations and relocated to Krefeld Airfield for a period of rest and replenishment. At Krefeld, the Gruppe received the then new Messerschmitt Bf 109 F-1, training on this type until they relocated to Saint-Omer, France on 14 February 1941. Staiger claimed three further victories, all Spitfire, before III. Gruppe was withdrawn from France on 26 May 1941 and moved to Düsseldorf where it was replenished with the Bf 109 F-2 and waited for further orders.

=== Eastern Front ===
By 15 June, JG 51 had completed its preparation for Operation Barbarossa, the German invasion of the Soviet Union and was based at airfields at Siedlce, Stara Wieś, Halasy where III. Gruppe was based and Krzewica, close to the German–Soviet demarcation line. The attack on the Soviet Union began at 03:45 on 22 June with JG 51 flying fighter patrols along the Bug River. That day, Staiger claimed three Tupolev SB-2 bombers shot down. On 30 June, when JG 51 became the first Geschwader to claim 1000 victories. Staiger shot down a further four bombers in the first great encirclement battle, over Minsk. On 14 July, he was seriously injured when his Bf 109 F-2 (Werknummer 8083—factory number) was hit by Soviet anti-aircraft fire and shot down near Stara Bychow, approximately 50 kilometres (31 miles) south of Mogilev on the Dnieper. In consequence, command of 7. Staffel passed to Oberleutnant Herbert Wehnelt.

While Staiger was recovering in hospital, he and another pilot of JG 51 were awarded the Knight's Cross of the Iron Cross (Ritterkreuz des Eisernen Kreuzes) on 16 July, Staiger for 25 aerial victories, and Oberleutnant Hans Kolbow from 5. Staffel posthumously after 27 aerial victories. After an extended period of convalescence he served in a number of pilot-training units for the next two years, and was promoted to Hauptmann (Captain) on 1 February 1943. Staiger briefly returned to JG 51 on the Eastern Front where he claimed a Lavochkin-Gorbunov-Gudkov LaGG-3 fighter shot down while flying with 9. Staffel. On 5 July, Staiger was transferred to the Western Front where he was appointed Staffelkapitän of 12. Staffel of Jagdgeschwader 26 "Schlageter" (JG 26—26th Fighter Wing), replacing Oberleutnant Erwin Leykauf who was transferred. The Staffel was subordinated to III. Gruppe of JG 26 commanded by Hauptmann Klaus Mietusch and based at Cuxhaven-Nordholz Airfield.

=== Defense of the Reich ===
Staiger claimed his first aerial victory in defense of the Reich on 17 July. That day, the United States Army Air Forces (USAAF) VIII Bomber Command sent 332 Boeing B-17 Flying Fortress heavy bombers to targets in the Netherlands and northern Germany. III. Gruppe of JG 26 intercepted the bombers over the North Sea. In this encounter, Staiger claimed a B-17 from the 351st Bombardment Group shot down. On 25 July, as part of Operation Gomorrah, a series of attacks on Hamburg in the last week of July 1943, approximately 100 B-17 bombers of the USAAF VIII Bomber Command bombed Hamburg and vicinity. II. Gruppe intercepted the lead bombers as they approached the Elbe estuary and claimed three B-17 bombers shot down, including one by Staiger. The next day during Blitz Week, the USAAF attacked synthetic rubber factories in Hannover and U-boat shipbuilding facilities in Hamburg. III. Gruppe again intercepted the USAAF bombers off the German coast where Staiger claimed a B-17F over the Weser estuary. On 29 July, the USAAF targeted Kiel and Warnemünde. III. Gruppe intercepted the bombers near Heligoland and kept attacking the bombers on their approach to Kiel. The Gruppe claimed four B-17 bombers of the 306th Bombardment Group shot down, including two by Staiger, one of which was not confirmed.

Combat box of a 12-plane B-17 squadron. Three such boxes completed a 36-plane group box.: 1. Lead Element; 2. High Element; 3. Low Element; 4. Low Low Element

III. Gruppe transferred from Cuxhaven-Nordholz to Amsterdam-Schiphol Airfield on 13 August. The USAAF targeted the German aircraft industry on 17 August in the Schweinfurt–Regensburg mission. That day, Staiger shot down a B-17 bomber west of Pesch, northwest of Aachen. On 8 September, III. Gruppe moved to an airfield at Lille-Vendeville in France. On 3 October, the RAF attacked the Beauvais–Tillé Airfield. Defending against the attack, Staiger claimed a Spitfire shot down near Beauvais. His opponent may have been Flight Lieutenant Raymond Hesselyn from No. 222 Squadron who was shot down and captured that day. (Note: According to Caldwell, two other Luftwaffe filed claims in the area of Beauvais and may have also been responsible for shooting down Flight Lieutenant Raymond Hesselyn. These pilots are Feldwebel Gerd Wiegand from 4. Staffel and the commanding officer of III. Gruppe, Major Klaus Mietusch.) On 10 October, VIII Bomber Command attacked Münster in northern Germany. III. Gruppe reached the USAAF bombers just after they started heading for England. Staiger and Unteroffizier Hans Oeckel both claimed a B-17 shot down but both pilots were wounded by the defensive gun fire of the bombers. Staiger, who crash landed his Bf 109 G-6 (Werknummer 15920) near Dorsten, sustained further injuries in his landing. On 22 October, III. Gruppe moved to Bönninghardt for a period of rest from operational flying. Here on 29 October, Staiger was presented the German Cross in Gold (Deutsches Kreuz in Gold) after 34 aerial victories. (Note: According to Obermaier, Patzwall and Scherzer, the German Cross in Gold was awarded on 27 October 1943.)

An attack by the USAAF on Gelsenkirchen and Münster on 5 November forced III. Gruppe into action again. The Gruppe intercepted the B-17 bombers of the 3rd Bombardment Division but was then dispersed by escorting fighters of the 353rd Fighter Group preventing a consolidated attack on the bombers. In this encounter, Staiger claimed a B-17 bomber shot down probably belonging to 388th Bombardment Group (Heavy). On 13 November, the Gruppe relocated to an airfield at Mönchengladbach. On 9 January 1944, III. Gruppe returned to France with Gruppenstab (headquarters unit), 9. and 11. Staffel at Lille-Vendeville, and 10. and 12. Staffel at Denain. On 21 January, the USAAF Ninth Air Force attacked several V-1 flying bomb launch sites. Defending against this attack, Staiger claimed two Spitfire fighters, but these claims were not filed. Three days later, the USAA planned on attacking Frankfurt am Main which failed to reach its objective. III. Gruppe engaged in combat with escorting Republic P-47 Thunderbolt fighters southwest of Brussels. In this aerial combat, Staiger claimed the destruction of a 78th Fighter Group P-47.

On 20 February, the Eighth Army Air Force, formerly known as VIII Bomber Command, launched Operation Argument, also known as "Big Week", a series of attacks on the German aircraft industry. Defending against this operation, Staiger shot down a P-47 fighter of the 353rd Fighter Group near Mönchengladbach, this was his 39th aerial victory claim to date. On 24 February, the Eighth Army Air Force targeted Schweinfurt, Gotha and Rostock. II. and III. Gruppe of JG 26 intercepted the bombers without their fighter escorts and attacked them head-on. Five B-17 bombers of the 40th Bombardment Wing were shot down, three from the 92nd and two from the 306th Bombardment Group, including one by Staiger south of Quakenbrück. The next day, the USAAF continued Operation Argument by attacking Augsburg, Stuttgart, Fürth and Regensburg. III. Gruppe again intercepted bombers of the 40th Bombardment Wing near Saarbrücken. That day, Staiger was credited with shooting down a B-17 bomber near Birkweiler close Sedan. On 2 March, the Eighth Army Air Force sent 481 bombers, escorted by 589 fighters, to Frankfurt. III. Gruppe of JG 26 intercepted the bombers near Koblenz. In head-on attack, Staiger claimed one of the B-17 bombers shot down west of Limburg an der Lahn. On 8 March, Staiger claimed two aerial victories. That day, the Eighth Air Force targeted the ball bearings works at Erkner near Berlin. III. Gruppe intercepted the bombers on their target approach between Steinhuder Meer and Braunschweig. Due to the defending escort fighters, the attack on the bombers was flown from the rear with only a few Bf 109 fighters. The 45th Combat Bombardment Wing lost eight B-17s between Steinhuder Meer and Braunschweig, including a B-17 from the 388th Bombardment Group (Heavy) shot down by Staiger north of Hannover. Staiger, and some other Luftwaffe fighters, continued to pursue the bombers to Berlin where Staiger claimed his second B-17 near Potsdam which was not confirmed. On this mission, the commanding officer of III. Gruppe, Mietusch, was shot down and injured. During Mietusch's convalescence, Staiger, in addition to his command of 12. Staffel, was temporarily given command of III. Gruppe.

The Eighth Army Air Force again targeted the German aircraft industry on 16 March. The bombers were intercepted near Saint-Dizier. However, the escorting fighters of the 56th Fighter Group attacked the Luftwaffe fighters just as they were forming up for a head-on attack on the bombers. The JG 26 fighters were scattered, denying a consolidated attack on the bombers. Staiger however managed to shoot down an aborting Consolidated B-24 Liberator bomber from the 445th Bombardment Group. Two days later, the Eighth Army Air Force continued the attack on the German aircraft industry and Staiger claimed a B-17 bomber shot down over Colmar. On 27 March, the USAAF bombed Luftwaffe airfields in France. In their defense, Staiger led an attack on a squadron of P-47 fighters from the 359th Fighter Group and shot one of them down northeast of Chartres. On 13 April, III. Gruppe operated from Étain Airfield, located approximately 12 miles (19 kilometers) east of Verdun, Staiger shot down a B-17 northwest of Kaiserslautern and a 364th Fighter Group Lockheed P-38 Lightning fighter near Bitburg; the American pilots' remains were found in 1996. Defending against an attack on southern Germany, Staiger claimed his 50th aerial victory when he shot down a Fifteenth Air Force B-17 bomber near Wiener Neustadt. The B-17 belonged to either the 97th or the 483rd Bombardment Group. While leading III. Gruppe on 24 April, Staiger claimed five aerial victories, potentially making him an ace-in-a-day when the Eighth Army Air Force attacked Luftwaffe targets at Munich, Oberpfaffenhofen and Friedrichshafen. Staiger's Bf 109 was equipped with the MK 108 cannon, firing 30 mm (1.2 in) mine and high-explosive incendiary shells through the propeller hub. He claimed three B-17 bombers shot down near Donauwörth, one of which was not confirmed, and two Herausschüsse (separation shots) near Munich. A Herausschuss (separation shot) denoted a severely damaged heavy bomber which was forced to separate from its combat box and was counted as an aerial victory.

=== Group commander ===
On 15 May 1944, Staiger was transferred and appointed Gruppenkommandeur (group commander) of the Focke-Wulf Fw 190-equipped I. Gruppe of JG 26, replacing Major Karl Borris. Command of his 12. Staffel was passed to Oberleutnant Karl-Hermann Schrader. On 6 June, the Allies launched Operation Overlord, the invasion of Normandy. In consequence, I. Gruppe relocated to Cormeilles Airfield. The following day, Staiger claimed two 362d Fighter Group P-47 fighters shot down near Lisieux. On 15 June, the Eighth Army Air Force attacked tactical targets in support of the invasion. In defense of this attack, Staiger claimed a Herausschuss over a B-17 bomber near Chartres which was not confirmed. On 20 June, Staiger claimed a 370th Fighter Group P-38 near Château-Thierry, northeast of Meaux. Three days later on 23 June, Staiger was credited with shooting down a Spitfire fighter west of Rouen, northeast of Bayeux. On 25 June, Staiger claimed another 370th Fighter Group P-38 near Rouen in combat over on the eastern area of the invasion front. On 14 July, Major Borris' returned to JG 26, taking over command of the Gruppe on 1 August. In consequence, Staiger was transferred to take command of II. Gruppe of Jagdgeschwader 1 "Oesau" (JG 1—1st Fighter Wing). He replaced Oberleutnant Rüdiger Kirchmayr who had temporarily led the Gruppe.

At the time of Staiger's posting to JG 1, II. Gruppe was based at Lonrai. On 10 August, during the German failed counter-attack named Operation Lüttich, Staiger claimed a Spitfire fighter shot down near Granville/Avranches. The next day, II. Gruppe retreated further east to an airfield at Connantre. By mid-August, the overall situation for II. Gruppe had deteriorated to the point that the Gruppe had to be withdrawn from combat operations on 16 August and relocated to Reinsehlen Airfield in Germany for a period of rest and replenishment. At Reinsehlen, the Gruppe was assigned new pilots, predominately directly coming from the Hitler Youth, no older than 18 to 20 years and lacking any combat experience. The Gruppe also received factory new Fw 190 A-8 aircraft. In early November, II. Gruppe relocated to Tutow, approximately 40 kilometers (25 miles) north of Neubrandenburg, where Staiger continued to train his new pilots which was impacted by lack of fuel. Combat readiness was reached in mid-November. On 26 November, the Eighth Army Air Force targeted the Leuna works near Merseburg. Defending against this attack, Staiger claimed a B-17 bomber shot down.

II./JG 1 emblem

In support of Operation Wacht am Rhein, also known as the Battle of the Bulge, II. Gruppe moved to an airfield at Drope, located approximately 15 kilometers (9.3 miles) east-northeast of Lingen, on 17 December. On 24 December, the Eighth Army Air Force launched its largest attack of the war, sending more than 2,000 heavy bombers against numerous Luftwaffe airfields. Defending against this attack, Staiger claimed one of the bombers shot down, his second while flying the Fw 190 in combat. Two days later, Staiger led his Gruppe on a mission during the Siege of Bastogne. That day, II. Gruppe lost eight pilots either killed in action or missing in action. Staiger's Fw 190 was also severely damaged, resulting in an emergency landing near Frankfurt. Although, he officially remained in command of II. Gruppe he never returned to his unit and was replaced by Oberleutnant Fritz Wegener. In consequence, Staiger was not involved in Operation Bodenplatte, the failed operation to gain air superiority during the stagnant stage of the Battle of the Bulge, but was transferred to III. Gruppe of Ergänzungs-Jagdgeschwader 2 (EJG 2—2nd Supplementary Fighter Wing) for conversion training to the then new Messerschmitt Me 262 jet aircraft.

On 12 January 1945, the General der Jagdflieger (General of Fighters) ordered the creation of II. Gruppe of Jagdgeschwader 7 "Nowotny" (JG 7—7th Fighter Wing). JG 7 "Nowotny" was the first operational jet fighter wing in the world and was named after Walter Nowotny, who was killed in action on 8 November 1944. Nowotny, a fighter pilot credited with 258 aerial victories and recipient of the Knight's Cross of the Iron Cross with Oak Leaves, Swords and Diamonds (Ritterkreuz des Eisernen Kreuzes mit Eichenlaub, Schwertern und Brillanten), had been assessing the Me 262 under operational conditions. The Gruppe was formed from remnants of IV. Gruppe of Jagdgeschwader 54 (JG 54—54th Fighter Wing) and placed under the command of Staiger. Retraining its pilots began in late February at Lechfeld Airfield. The first pilots completed conversion training in early April and transferred to Brandenburg-Briest. But with very limited aircraft (and, more particularly, engines) available for the other Gruppen, let alone his, it struggled to get operational. Its first ten aircraft, along with a pair of two-seater trainers, were delivered a week later to allow training to commence. By then Staiger had passed command of II. Gruppe of JG 7 over to Hauptmann Lutz-Wilhelm Burckhardt.

== Later life ==
Staiger died on 22 June 1964 at the age of 49 in Freiburg im Breisgau, West Germany.

== Summary of career ==
=== Aerial victory claims ===
According to Spick, Staiger was credited with 63 aerial victories claimed in over 400 combat missions, including 26 heavy bombers. Forsyth also lists him with 26 heavy bombers shot down. According to Weal, Staiger, together with Oberleutnant Hugo Frey, was the most successful fighter pilot against the heavy bombers while flying the Bf 109. Mathews and Foreman, authors of Luftwaffe Aces — Biographies and Victory Claims, researched the German Federal Archives and found documentation for 55 aerial victory claims, plus eleven further unconfirmed claims. This number includes 14 claims on the Eastern Front and 41 over the Western Allies, including 19 four-engined bombers.

Victory claims were logged to a map-reference (PQ = Planquadrat), for example "PQ 35 Ost 63613". The Luftwaffe grid map (Jägermeldenetz) covered all of Europe, western Russia and North Africa and was composed of rectangles measuring 15 minutes of latitude by 30 minutes of longitude, an area of about 360 square miles (930 km^{2}). These sectors were then subdivided into 36 smaller units to give a location area 3 km × 4 km (1.9 mi × 2.5 mi) in size.

Chronicle of aerial victories
This and the – (dash) indicates unwitnessed aerial victory claims for which Staiger did not receive credit. This along with the * (asterisk) indicates an Herausschuss (separation shot)—a severely damaged heavy bomber forced to separate from his combat box which was counted as an aerial victory. This and the ? (question mark) indicates information discrepancies listed by Prien, Stemmer, Rodeike, Bock, Mathews and Foreman.
Claim	Date	Time	Type	Location	Claim	Date	Time	Type	Location
– 1. Staffel of Jagdgeschwader 20 – Battle of France — 10 May – 25 June 1940
1	31 May 1940	18:27	Spitfire	northwest of Dunkirk					
– 7. Staffel of Jagdgeschwader 51 – At the Channel and over England — 26 June 1940 – 26 May 1941
2	30 June 1940	12:55	Blenheim	10 km (6.2 mi) east of Saint-Omer	8	14 September 1940	—	Hurricane	Dungeness
3	8 July 1940	16:35	Spitfire	northwest of Cap Gris-Nez	9	15 September 1940	—	Hurricane	Tonbridge
4	11 July 1940	12:55	Blenheim	15 km (9.3 mi) northeast of Deal	10	13 March 1941	15:23	Spitfire	20 km (12 mi) west of Cap Gris-Nez
5	5 August 1940	09:55	Spitfire	10 km (6.2 mi) southwest of Dover	11	11 April 1941	13:40	Spitfire	Dungeness
6	7 September 1940	—	Spitfire	London	12	29 April 1941	10:12? (Note: According to Mathews and Foreman claimed at 12:00.)	Spitfire	5 km (3.1 mi) north of Dunkirk
7	7 September 1940	—	Spitfire	London					
– 7. Staffel of Jagdgeschwader 51 – Operation Barbarossa — 22 June – 14 July 1941
13	22 June 1941	12:37	SB-2		20	30 June 1941	—	DB-3	
14	22 June 1941	—	SB-2		21	3 July 1941	—	Boston	
15	22 June 1941	—	SB-2		22	5 July 1941	—	V-11 (Il-2)	
16	24 June 1941	11:30	SB-2		23	8 July 1941	—	DB-3	
17	30 June 1941	11:50	SB-2		24	11 July 1941	—	unknown	
18	30 June 1941	19:00? (Note: According to Mathews and Foreman claimed at 19:30.)	DB-3		25	11 July 1941	—	unknown	
19	30 June 1941	—	DB-3						
– 9. Staffel of Jagdgeschwader 51 "Mölders" – On the Eastern Front — June 1943
26	2 June 1943	10:58	LaGG-3	PQ 35 Ost 63613 vicinity of Lukawetz					
– 12. Staffel of Jagdgeschwader 26 "Schlageter" – Defense of the Reich — 5 July 1943 – 31 December 1943
27	17 July 1943	09:28? (Note: According to Mathews and Foreman claimed at 08:28.)	B-17	PQ 05 Ost S/SP-1; North Sea, German Bight	31	17 August 1943	15:20	B-17	northwest of Aachen west of Pesch
28	25 July 1943	16:50	B-17	PQ 05 Ost S/BB-4/2 west of the Weser estuary	32? (Note: According to Mathews and Foreman this claim was unconfirmed.)	3 October 1943	18:25? (Note: According to Mathews and Foreman, time of claim is unknown.)	Spitfire	Beauvais
29	26 July 1943	11:54? (Note: According to Mathews and Foreman claimed at 11:51.)	B-17	PQ 05 Ost S/CS-9/2; Weser estuary	33	10 October 1943	15:15	B-17	Tilbeck, west of Münster
30	29 July 1943	09:40	B-17	PQ 05 Ost S/TQ-1; Kiel	—	5 November 1943	—	B-17	PQ 05 Ost S/KP-9, Dortmund
—	29 July 1943	— ? (Note: According to Mathews and Foreman claimed at 09:15.)	B-17	Wesermünde/Kiel					
– 12. Staffel of Jagdgeschwader 26 "Schlageter" – On the Western Front — 10 January – 14 May 1944
—	21 January 1944	—	Spitfire	east of Saint-Pol	40	16 March 1944	12:10	B-24	southwest of Saint-Dizier
—	21 January 1944	— ? (Note: According to Mathews and Foreman claimed at 13:40.)	Spitfire	east of Amiens	—	18 March 1944	—	B-17	Colmar
—	24 January 1944	— ? (Note: According to Mathews and Foreman claimed at 11:00.)	P-47	southwest of Brussels	41	27 March 1944	14:35	P-47	northeast of Chartres
34	30 January 1944	13:30	P-47	PQ 05 Ost GN; Raalte	42	13 April 1944	13:34	B-17	PQ 05 Ost SP west of Trier
35	22 February 1944	15:23	P-47	PQ 05 Ost MN-LN; Mönchengladbach	43	13 April 1944	16:20	P-38	PQ 05 Ost RN-8 northwest of Kaiserslautern
36	24 February 1944	12:20	B-17	south of Quakenbrück	44	23 April 1944	14:20	B-17	PQ 14 Ost EO-9/FO-3 southeast of Wiener Neustadt
37	25 February 1944	13:00	B-17	Birkweiler near Sedan	45	24 April 1944	13:30	B-17	PQ 04 Ost N/BB-7/8; Donauwörth
38	2 March 1944	11:50	B-17	PQ 05 Ost PP/QQ west of Limburg an der Lahn	46	24 April 1944	13:55? (Note: According to Mathews and Foreman claimed at 14:05.)	B-17	PQ 04 Ost N/ED south of Munich
39?	8 March 1944	— ? (Note: According to Mathews and Foreman claimed at 13:00.)	B-17*	north of Hannover	47	24 April 1944	14:05	B-17*	PQ 04 Ost N/ED south of Munich
—	8 March 1944	—	B-17	Potsdam	48	24 April 1944	14:10?	B-17*	PQ 04 Ost N/ED south of Munich
– Stab I. Gruppe of Jagdgeschwader 26 "Schlageter" – On the Western Front — 14 May – 31 July 1944
49	7 June 1944	15:58	P-47	north of Lisieux	51	20 June 1944	17:35	P-38	PQ 05 Ost UC-7/9 northeast of Meaux
50	7 June 1944	16:00	P-47	north of Lisieux	52	23 June 1944	12:20? (Note: According to Mathews and Foreman claimed at 12:25.)	Spitfire	PQ 05 Ost TA-1/2 west of Rouen
—	15 June 1944	—	B-24? (Note: According to Mathews and Foreman this was an unconfirmed Herausschuss over a Boeing B-17 Flying Fortress bomber claimed at 06:55.)	80 km (50 mi) south of Chartres	53	25 June 1944	15:35	P-38	PQ 05 Ost TB southwest of Rouen
– 12. Staffel of Jagdgeschwader 26 "Schlageter" – Defense of the Reich — 1 August 1944 – January 1945
54	10 August 1944	14:10	Spitfire	PQ 05 Ost AS-3 east of Granville	55	5 December 1944	11:15	P-51	PQ 15 Ost CF south of Waren
—	26 November 1944	—	B-17		56	24 December 1944	12:30	B-17	St. Vith

=== Awards ===
- Iron Cross (1939) 2nd and 1st Class
- Knight's Cross of the Iron Cross on 16 July 1941 as Oberleutnant and Staffelkapitän of the 7./Jagdgeschwader 51
- German Cross in Gold on 27 October 1943 as Hauptmann in the 12./Jagdgeschwader 26
