= Maximilian Mayerl =

Knight's Cross recipient (1917–2010)

- Born: 28 May 1917; Aigen im Ennstal, Austria
- Died: 11 February 2010 (aged 92); Nîmes, France
- Military career
- Allegiance: Nazi Germany
- Branch: Luftwaffe
- Service years: 1937–1945
- Rank: Hauptmann (captain)
- Unit: JG 51
- Conflicts: World War II; Eastern Front; Defence of the Reich
- Awards: Knight's Cross of the Iron Cross

Maximilian Mayerl (28 May 1917 – 11 February 2010) was a fighter pilot in the Luftwaffe of Nazi Germany and recipient of the Knight's Cross of the Iron Cross During his career Maximilian Mayerl was credited with 76 aerial victories in 600+ missions.

== Early life and career ==
Mayerl was born on 28 May 1917 in Aigen im Ennstal, Styria, then in Austria-Hungary. He joined the military service of the Luftwaffe on 1 November 1937. Following flight and fighter pilot training, (Note: Flight training in the Luftwaffe progressed through the levels A1, A2 and B1, B2, referred to as A/B flight training. A training included theoretical and practical training in aerobatics, navigation, long-distance flights and dead-stick landings. The B courses included high-altitude flights, instrument flights, night landings and training to handle the aircraft in difficult situations.) Mayerl was posted to 2. Staffel (2nd squadron) of Jagdgeschwader 20 (JG 20—20th Fighter Wing) in July 1939. This was a wing in name only, being just a single Gruppe (Fighter Group) that had been set up just prior to the outbreak of war, in July 1939. His commanding officer was the Condor Legion veteran Walter Oesau.

== World War II ==
Following the Armistice of 22 June 1940, the Luftwaffe continued to fight the RAF in the Battle of Britain. On 4 July, I. Gruppe of JG 20 was officially integrated into JG 51, becoming its III. Gruppe. In consequence, Mayerl became a member of the 8. Staffel, a Staffel of III. Gruppe of JG 51. During a period of the battle of Britain referred to as Kanalkampf, Mayerl claimed his second aerial victory on 19 July, a Supermarine Spitfire fighter shot down 10 kilometers (6.2 miles) south of Dover.

=== Eastern Front ===
By 15 June, JG 51 had completed its preparation for Operation Barbarossa, the German invasion of the Soviet Union and was based at airfields at Siedlce, Stara Wieś, Halasy where III. Gruppe was based and Krzewica, close to the German–Soviet demarcation line. The attack on the Soviet Union began at 03:45 on 22 June with JG 51 flying fighter patrols along the Bug River.

On 7 August 1942, Mayerl was appointed Staffelkapitän (squadron leader) of 9. Staffel of JG 51. He succeeded Oberleutnant Gottfried Schlitzer who had died the day before from wounds sustained on 3 August.

In September 1943, Mayerl fell ill and was temporarily replaced by Oberleutnant Max-Hermann Lücke. On 23 October, Lücke was severely injured in a mid-air collision, dying on 8 November. In consequence, he was succeeded by Leutnant Heinz Venth. On 8 December, Mayerl was officially replaced by Oberleutnant Günther Schack as commander of 9. Staffel. Following his convalescence, Mayerl was transferred to I. Gruppe of Ergänzungs-Jagdgeschwader 2, a replacement training unit.

== Summary of career ==
=== Aerial victory claims ===
According to US historian David T. Zabecki, Mayerl was credited with 76 aerial victories. Mathews and Foreman, authors of Luftwaffe Aces – Biographies and Victory Claims, researched the German Federal Archives and found documentation for 75 aerial victory claims, plus one further unconfirmed claim. This number includes 71 claims on the Eastern Front and four on the Western Front.

Victory claims were logged to a map-reference (PQ = Planquadrat), for example "PQ 3766". The Luftwaffe grid map (Jägermeldenetz) covered all of Europe, western Russia and North Africa and was composed of rectangles measuring 15 minutes of latitude by 30 minutes of longitude, an area of about 360 square miles (930 km^{2}). These sectors were then subdivided into 36 smaller units to give a location area 3 km × 4 km (1.9 mi × 2.5 mi) in size.

Chronicle of aerial victories
This and the ? (question mark) indicates information discrepancies listed by Prien, Stemmer, Rodeike, Bock, Mathews and Foreman.
Claim	Date	Time	Type	Location	Claim	Date	Time	Type	Location
– 2. Staffel of Jagdgeschwader 20 – Battle of France — 10 May – 25 June 1940
1	8 June 1940	13:10	Blenheim	Allery					
– 8. Staffel of Jagdgeschwader 51 – At the Channel and over England — 26 June 1940 – 26 May 1941
2	19 July 1940	13:52	Spitfire	10 km (6.2 mi) south of Dover	4	18 August 1940	14:36	Spitfire	south of London
3	8 August 1940	12:55	Spitfire	Dover					
– 9. Staffel of Jagdgeschwader 51 – Operation Barbarossa — 22 June – 5 December 1941
5	26 July 1941	18:45	Pe-2	5 km (3.1 mi) south of Dorogobuzh	11	19 September 1941	10:15	Pe-2	15 km (9.3 mi) east of Konotop
6	26 July 1941	18:45	Pe-2	10 km (6.2 mi) south of Dorogobuzh	12	20 September 1941	07:50	I-61 (MiG-3)	10 km (6.2 mi) east of Novhorod-Siverskyi
7? (Note: According to Mathews and Foreman this claim was unconfirmed.)	27 July 1941	10:10	SB-2	10 km (6.2 mi) north of Yelnya	13	22 September 1941	12:15	I-61 (MiG-3)	3 km (1.9 mi) north of Lebedyn
8	29 July 1941	18:10	DB-3	20 km (12 mi) northeast of Yelnya	14	22 September 1941	12:15	I-61 (MiG-3)	3 km (1.9 mi) north of Lebedyn
9	15 September 1941	15:50	DB-3	40 km (25 mi) east of Konotop	15	22 September 1941	12:35	I-61 (MiG-3)	10 km (6.2 mi) northeast of Lebedyn
10	19 September 1941	06:22	SB-2	15 km (9.3 mi) east of Konotop					
– 9. Staffel of Jagdgeschwader 51 "Mölders" – Eastern Front — 5 December 1941 – 30 April 1942
16	4 February 1942	13:20	I-26 (Yak-1)	25 km (16 mi) northeast of Rzhev	19	16 February 1942	12:30	I-61 (MiG-3)	22 km (14 mi) northwest of Rzhev
17	10 February 1942	11:03	Pe-2	18 km (11 mi) north of Rzhev	20	17 February 1942	08:10	I-61 (MiG-3)	20 km (12 mi) northeast of Rzhev
18	10 February 1942	16:10	I-26 (Yak-1)	37 km (23 mi) northeast of Rzhev	21	22 March 1942	09:23	I-61 (MiG-3)	1 km (0.62 mi) east of Shatalovka
– 9. Staffel of Jagdgeschwader 51 "Mölders" – Eastern Front — 1 May 1942 – 3 February 1943
22	19 May 1942	14:10	Pe-2	10 km (6.2 mi) north of Rzhev	30	11 September 1942	12:47	LaGG-3	8 km (5.0 mi) east of Rzhev
23	28 May 1942	12:35? (Note: According to Mathews and Foreman claimed at 12:33.)	Il-2	18 km (11 mi) northwest of Yukhnov	31	14 September 1942	10:10	LaGG-3	18 km (11 mi) northwest of Rzhev
24	2 July 1942	04:00	MiG-3	1 km (0.62 mi) east of Olenino	32	15 October 1942	15:08	Il-2	7 km (4.3 mi) southeast of Bely
25	5 July 1942	15:55	Pe-2	30 km (19 mi) northeast of Bely	33	26 October 1942	10:25	MiG-3	45 km (28 mi) west of Bely
26	13 August 1942	19:00	Il-2	25 km (16 mi) north of Zubtsov	34	29 October 1942	12:00	MiG-3	48 km (30 mi) northwest of Bely
27	21 August 1942	09:10	MiG-3	10 km (6.2 mi) west of Zubtsov	35	15 January 1943	12:08	R-10 (Seversky)	PQ 3766, north-northwest of Rzhev
28	5 September 1942	17:27	LaGG-3	15 km (9.3 mi) northeast of Sychyovka	36	27 January 1943	14:30	LaGG-3	PQ 5677, southeast of Temkino
29	11 September 1942	12:41	LaGG-3	3 km (1.9 mi) west of Zubtsov					
– 9. Staffel of Jagdgeschwader 51 "Mölders" – Eastern Front — 4 February – September 1943
37	23 February 1943	10:30	Pe-2	PQ 35 Ost 44282, 10 km (6.2 mi) northeast of Zhizdra	57	14 July 1943	17:25	La-5	PQ 35 Ost 54277, 5 km (3.1 mi) north of Ulyanovo
38	23 February 1943	10:37	Pe-2	PQ 35 Ost 44293, 10 km (6.2 mi) east of Zhizdra	58	14 July 1943	17:35	La-5	PQ 35 Ost 54418, 6 km (3.7 mi) southeast of Ulyanovo
39	23 February 1943	14:25	Il-2	PQ 35 Ost 54142, 30 km (19 mi) northeast of Zhizdra	59	14 July 1943	18:05	LaGG-3	PQ 35 Ost 54462, 25 km (16 mi) east-southeast of Ulyanovo
40	24 February 1943	14:20	MiG-3	PQ 35 Ost 55763, 2 km (1.2 mi) east of Suchinitschi	60	15 July 1943	18:55	MiG-3	PQ 35 Ost 63227, 3 km (1.9 mi) west of Archangelskoje
41	8 March 1943	13:10	Il-2	PQ 35 Ost 63261, 12 km (7.5 mi) west-southwest of Novosil	61	22 July 1943	17:40	Il-2 m.H. (Note: The "m.H." refers to an Ilyushin Il-2 with rear gunner (mit Heckschütze).)	PQ 35 Ost 54733, 12 km (7.5 mi) north-northeast of Chotynez
42	9 March 1943	10:58	Pe-2	PQ 35 Ost 63274, 36 km (22 mi) southwest of Novosil	62	22 July 1943	17:42	Il-2 m.H.	PQ 35 Ost 54593, 21 km (13 mi) north of Chotynez
43	9 March 1943	11:03	Pe-2	PQ 35 Ost 63432, 27 km (17 mi) south-southwest of Novosil	63	1 August 1943	14:14	La-5	PQ 35 Ost 54653, 15 km (9.3 mi) west-southwest of Bolkhov
44	17 March 1943	11:17	Yak-1	PQ 35 Ost 5365, 35 km (22 mi) south of Kromy	64	2 August 1943	15:50	La-5	PQ 35 Ost 53467, 12 km (7.5 mi) southeast of Kromy
45	18 March 1943	08:00	LaGG-3	PQ 35 Ost 5353, 36 km (22 mi) southwest of Kromy	65	4 August 1943	06:02	LaGG-3	PQ 35 Ost 63146, 10 km (6.2 mi) southeast of Oryol
46	18 March 1943	08:25	LaGG-3	PQ 35 Ost 5347, 20 km (12 mi) southwest of Kromy	66	4 August 1943	15:05	La-5	PQ 35 Ost 63142, 5 km (3.1 mi) south of Oryol
47	6 July 1943	08:58	La-5	PQ 35 Ost 53663, 12 km (7.5 mi) southeast of Trosna	67	9 August 1943	14:50	LaGG-3	PQ 35 Ost 45385, 20 km (12 mi) northeast of Spas-Demensk
48	6 July 1943	12:35	LaGG-3	PQ 35 Ost 63363, 8 km (5.0 mi) south of Simjewka	68	9 August 1943	14:52	LaGG-3	PQ 35 Ost 45385, 20 km (12 mi) northeast of Spas-Demensk
49	6 July 1943	17:50	LaGG-3	PQ 35 Ost 63531, 12 km (7.5 mi) northwest of Maloarkhangelsk	69	10 August 1943	13:05	La-5	PQ 35 Ost 45388, 20 km (12 mi) northeast of Spas-Demensk
50	6 July 1943	19:35	La-5	PQ 35 Ost 63563, 10 km (6.2 mi) southwest of Maloarkhangelsk	70	10 August 1943	15:40	LaGG-3	PQ 35 Ost 35486, 20 km (12 mi) northwest of Spas-Demensk
51	8 July 1943	08:25	La-5	PQ 35 Ost 63561, 12 km (7.5 mi) west of Maloarkhangelsk	71	10 August 1943	15:55	La-5	PQ 35 Ost 35495, 17 km (11 mi) north-northwest of Spas-Demensk
52	8 July 1943	08:32	La-5	PQ 35 Ost 63532, 10 km (6.2 mi) north of Ponyri	72	12 August 1943	09:40	La-5	PQ 35 Ost 35493, 17 km (11 mi) north of Spas-Demensk
53	9 July 1943	17:21	LaGG-3	PQ 35 Ost 63551, 15 km (9.3 mi) north of Ponyri	73	12 August 1943	12:20	La-5	PQ 35 Ost 35453, 30 km (19 mi) north-northwest of Spas-Demensk
54	12 July 1943	19:40	La-5	PQ 35 Ost 54417, 5 km (3.1 mi) south of Ulyanovo	74	23 August 1943	13:55	Yak-9	PQ 35 Ost 43219, 32 km (20 mi) southwest of Karachev
55	12 July 1943	19:43	Il-2 m.H.	PQ 35 Ost 54442, 10 km (6.2 mi) southeast of Ulyanovo	75	27 August 1943	09:10	P-39	PQ 35 Ost 43765, 6 km (3.7 mi) southwest of Sevsk
56	12 July 1943	20:00	LaGG-3	PQ 35 Ost 54418, 6 km (3.7 mi) southeast of Ulyanovo	76	27 August 1943	09:13	Yak-7	PQ 35 Ost 43812, 9 km (5.6 mi) northeast of Sevsk

=== Awards ===
- Iron Cross (1939) 2nd and 1st Class
- Honor Goblet of the Luftwaffe on 6 July 1942 as Leutnant and pilot (Note: According to Obermaier on 29 June 1942.)
- German Cross in Gold on 27 November 1942 as Leutnant in the 9./Jagdgeschwader 51
- Knight's Cross of the Iron Cross on 22 November 1943 as Oberleutnant and Staffelkapitän of the 9./Jagdgeschwader 51 "Mölders"
