= Günther Schack =

German World War II fighter pilot

- Günther Schack
- Born: 12 November 1917; Bartenstein, German Empire
- Died: 14 June 2003 (aged 85); Schmidt near Nideggen, Germany
- Military career
- Allegiance: Nazi Germany
- Branch: Luftwaffe
- Service years: 1939–1945
- Rank: Major (major)
- Units: JG 51, JG 3
- Commands: 9./JG 51, I./JG 51, IV./JG 3
- Conflicts: See battles World War II: Eastern Front; Operation Barbarossa; Battle of Kursk; Courland Pocket
- Awards: Knight's Cross of the Iron Cross with Oak Leaves

Günther Schack (12 November 1917 – 14 June 2003) was a German Luftwaffe military aviator during World War II and a fighter ace credited with 174 enemy aircraft shot down in 780 combat missions. All of his victories were claimed on the Eastern Front.

Born in Bartenstein in Eastern Prussia, Schack joined the military service in the Luftwaffe of Nazi Germany in 1939. Following flight training, he was posted to 7. Staffel (squadron) of Jagdgeschwader 51 (JG 51—51st Fighter Wing). He claimed his first aerial victory on 23 July 1941 during Operation Barbarossa, the German invasion of the Soviet Union. In April 1943, he was posted to fighter pilot training, returning to the Eastern Front in July. He claimed his 100th aerial victory in September and was awarded the Knight's Cross of the Iron Cross on 29 October 1943. Schack was appointed Staffelkapitän (squadron leader) of 9. Staffel and received the Knight's Cross of the Iron Cross with Oak Leaves on 20 April 1944 following 133 aerial victories. In December 1944, he was appointed Gruppenkommandeur (group commander) of the I. Gruppe (1st group) of JG 51 "Mölders". This unit was disbanded in April 1945. He then briefly took command of IV. (Sturm) Gruppe of Jagdgeschwader 3 "Udet" (JG 3—3rd Fighter Wing) which he led until the end of World War II in Europe.

After the war he lived secluded in the Eifel Mountains, and devoted himself to philosophical research and died on 14 June 2003 in Schmidt, Nideggen.

== Early life ==
Schack was born on 12 November 1917 in Bartenstein, at the time in Eastern Prussia of the German Empire, present-day Bartoszyce in the Warmian-Masurian Voivodeship, He was the son of an Superintendent. Following graduation from school, Schack studied metallurgy at the University of Stuttgart and at the Rheinisch-Westfälische Technische Hochschule in Aachen. In 1937, he attempted to join the Luftwaffe but was categorised as wehruntauglich (unsuited for military service) because of a sports injury earlier in his life. On Friday 1 September 1939 German forces invaded Poland which marked the beginning of World War II. The next day, Schack again volunteered for military service and was accepted.

== World War II ==
Following flight training as a fighter pilot, (Note: Flight training in the Luftwaffe progressed through the levels A1, A2 and B1, B2, referred to as A/B flight training. A training included theoretical and practical training in aerobatics, navigation, long-distance flights and dead-stick landings. The B courses included high-altitude flights, instrument flights, night landings, and training to handle the aircraft in difficult situations.) Gefreiter (Privat First Class) Schack was posted to 7. Staffel (squadron) of Jagdgeschwader 51 (JG 51—51st Fighter Wing) on 18 March 1941. (Note: For an explanation of Luftwaffe unit designations see Organization of the Luftwaffe during World War II.) At the time, III. Gruppe of JG 51, to which 7. Staffel was subordinated, was based at Saint-Omer in Northern France. The Gruppe was equipped with the Messerschmitt Bf 109 F-1 and commanded by Hauptmann (Captain) Richard Leppla and fought against the Royal Air Force over the English Channel. The unit was withdrawn from France on 26 May 1941 and moved to Düsseldorf where it was replenished with the Bf 109 F-2 and waited for further orders.

=== Eastern Front ===
Logo of the Jagdgeschwader 51 "Mölders"

By 15 June, JG 51 had completed its preparation for Operation Barbarossa, the German invasion of the Soviet Union and was based at airfields at Siedlce, Stara Wieś, Halasy where III. Gruppe was based and Krzewica, close to the German–Soviet demarcation line. The attack on the Soviet Union began at 03:45 on 22 June with JG 51 flying fighter patrols along the Bug River. The German advance into the Soviet Union required constant relocation of III. Gruppe. On 20 July, the Gruppe was moved to an airfield at Orsha, approximately 100 kilometres (62 miles) southwest of Smolensk, and flew combat air patrols along the Dnieper in the area between Mogilev and Zhlobin. Flying from Orsha, Schack claimed his first aerial victory on 23 July 1941 during the Battle of Smolensk. That day he shot down a Tupolev SB bomber northeast of Babruysk, and received the Iron Cross 2nd Class (Eisernes Kreuz zweiter Klasse) on 10 August 1941.

In October 1941, German forces launched the strategic offensive named Operation Typhoon which resulted in the Battle of Moscow. Schack claimed his second victory during this offensive when he shot down a Petlyakov Pe-2 bomber northeast of Yukhnov. On 23 October, he bailed out of his burning Bf 109 F-2 (Werknummer 9189—factory number) following aerial combat near Ugoskosawed which is in the vicinity of Kaluga. He achieved his third air victory after 100 combat missions, on 10 November 1941. On 30 July 1942, he flew his 250th combat mission. That day, he also damaged Bf 109 F-2 (Werknummer 8117) in a ground collision during an emergency takeoff at Dugino in the Novoduginsky District. In October, III Gruppe predominantly flew combat air patrols in the vicinity of Rzhev where the German 9th Army was deployed. Schack claimed his 18th aerial victory on 15 October, an Ilyushin Il-2 ground attack aircraft shot down west of Bely.

On 10 November 1942, III. Gruppe received the order to convert to the Focke-Wulf Fw 190 at Jesau, present-day Juschny, located southeast of Königsberg. Because Luftwaffe units were already stretched in the combat area of Army Group Center, fighting in the Battles of Rzhev, conversion was done in rotation, one squadron at a time. The first units converted were the Gruppenstab (headquarters unit) and 7. Staffel while 8. and 9. Staffel were still engaged over the left flank of Army Group Center. In total, III. Gruppe received a complement of 41 Fw 190 A-2s and Fw 190 A-3s. On 16 December, first elements of 7. Staffel arrived at Dugino. The next day, on his first mission on the Fw 190, Schack shot down five Soviet Pe-2 bombers in the vicinity of Sychyovka, making him an "ace-in-a-day" for the first time. Six weeks later, on 29 January 1943, Schack almost repeated this when his Schwarm (flight of four aircraft), on a Junkers Ju 87 escort mission, encountered eight Soviet Pe-2 flying in a line astern crossing the German lines at Novosil. Within five minutes all eight were shot down including four by Schack.

Operating from the airfield at Oryol-West, equipped with heated hangars and buildings, III. Gruppe was tasked with operating in the airspace south and east of Oryol. On 23 February, Schack for the second time became an "ace-in-a-day", claiming five aerial victories in the vicinity of Zhizdra. That day, he shot down an Il-2 ground attack aircraft on an early morning mission followed by a Lavochkin La-5 fighter at 09:33. Shortly after noon, he claimed three Lavochkin-Gorbunov-Gudkov LaGG-3 fighters. Schack, who had been promoted to Leutnant (Second Lieutenant) on 1 January 1943, was awarded the German Cross in Gold (Deutsches Kreuz in Gold) on 26 February 1943. On 1 April 1943, he was transferred to Ergänzungs-Jagdgruppe Ost, a supplementary training unit, where served as a flight instructor, sharing his combat experience with new fighter pilots destined for the Eastern Front.

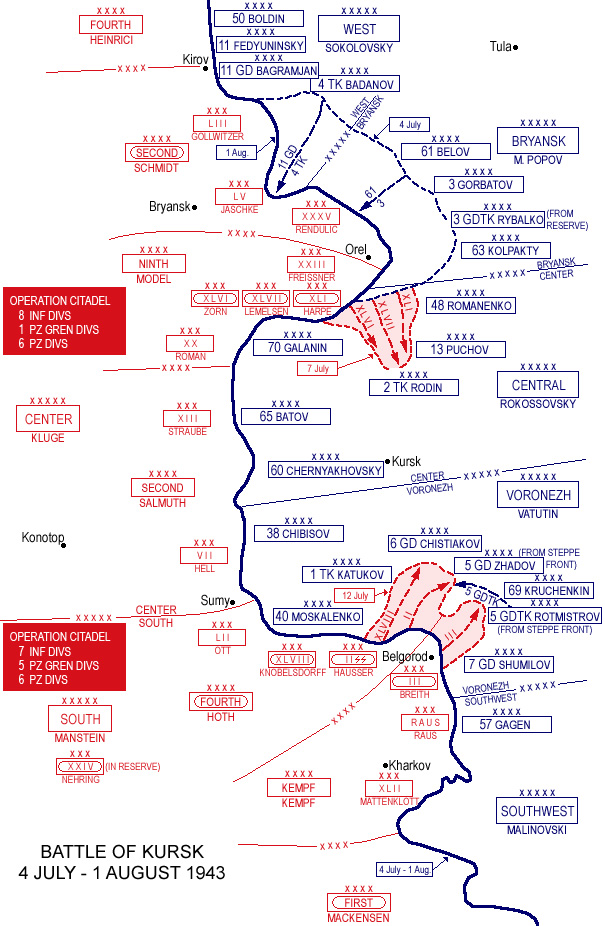
Map of German penetration during the attack on the Kursk salient and Soviet counteroffensive in the northern sector

Schack returned to the front on 5 July 1943, this time posted to 8. Staffel of JG 51, a squadron also subordinated to III. Gruppe. The date of Schack's posting to 8. Staffel coincides with the start of the German offensive Operation Citadel as part of the Battle of Kursk. In this operation, III. Gruppe was tasked with supporting 9th Army on the northern flank of the offensive. On 12 July, Soviet forces launched Operation Kutuzov, the northern offensive, with its objective being to collapse the Oryol salient, cut behind the 9th Army engaged in offensive operations at Kursk, encircle and annihilate it. On 15 July, rain impacted aerial operations and III. Gruppe flew its first missions in the early afternoon in the vicinity north of the Oryol salient. The Gruppe encountered a number of Soviet LaGG-3, Yakovlev Yak-1 and Mikoyan-Gurevich MiG-3 fighter aircraft north of Bolkhov. In this encounter, III. Gruppe claimed five aerial victories including three by Schack. Later that day, the Gruppe escorted Ju-87 to the vicinity of Archangelskoje east of Oryol. On that mission, Schack claimed a La-5 shot down. Based at Bryansk, Schack flew three combat missions on 21 July 1943. He did not claim any aerial victories on the first and second mission of the day. On the third mission which began at 19:15, he encountered La-5s north-east of Zhizdra and claimed one La-5 shot down. According to Bergström, this claim was his 56th aerial victory while Mathews and Foreman list this claim as his 54th victory. In total, he claimed 10 victories in July and then a further 40 in August.

=== Squadron leader ===
On 20 August 1943, Schack was transferred again to 7. Staffel and was temporarily put in charge of this squadron as acting Staffelführer (squadron leader). He replaced Oberleutnant (First Lieutenant) Karl-Heinz Weber in this capacity who returned to retake command of 7. Staffel on 15 October. In August 1943, four different aircraft flown by Schack sustained various degrees of combat damage. On 3 August, he crash landed his Fw 190 A southwest of Oryol following aerial combat. Two days later, his Fw 190 A-6 (Werknummer 530315) sustained heavy damage in aerial combat. On 15 August, Schack flew Fw 190 A-4 (Werknummer 5724) which was hit by Soviet anti-aircraft artillery near Spas-Demensk. Fw 190 A (Werknummer 7330) was hit by friendly fire on 28 August resulting in a forced landing at Glukhov.

Flying from Konotop on 3 September, Schack escorted Ju 87 dive bombers on their mission to attack Soviet forces in southeast of Sevsk, west of Kursk. That day III. Gruppe claimed four aerial victories, including a La-5 fighter shot down by Schack east of Glukhov. This claim was reported as his 100th aerial victory. (Note: According to Mathews and Foreman this claim is listed as his 98th aerial victory. Mathews and Foreman date his 100th aerial victory on 6 September.) He was the 52nd Luftwaffe pilot to achieve the century-mark. On 26 October, he was awarded the Knight's Cross of the Iron Cross (Ritterkreuz des Eisernen Kreuzes) for 116 victories. On 9 December 1943, promoted to Oberleutnant, Schack was officially given command of 9. Staffel of JG 51 as Staffelkapitän, replacing Oberleutnant Maximilian Mayerl who was transferred. Mayerl had fallen ill in September 1943 and had temporarily beenn replaced by Oberleutnant Max-Hermann Lücke. On 23 October, Lücke was severely injured in a mid-air collision, dying on 8 November. In consequence, he was then succeeded by Leutnant Heinz Venth before Schack was given command.

1944 saw the German forces pushed inexorably out of Russia and III. Gruppe of JG 51 covered the retreat of Army Group Centre, moving from Orsha to Terespol then back to Minsk and Kaunas, with Schack scoring consistently. On 16 January, he was shot down by Soviet fighters in a Fw 190 A southeast of Babruysk. Schack was awarded the Knight's Cross of the Iron Cross with Oak Leaves (Ritterkreuz des Eisernen Kreuzes mit Eichenlaub) on 20 April 1944 for 133 aerial victories. The presentation was made by Adolf Hitler at the Berghof, Hitler's residence in the Obersalzberg of the Bavarian Alps, on 5 May 1944. Also present at the ceremony were Anton Hafner, Otto Kittel, Emil Lang, Alfred Grislawski, Erich Rudorffer, Martin Möbus, Wilhelm Herget, Hans-Karl Stepp, Rudolf Schoenert, Günther Radusch, Otto Pollmann and Fritz Breithaupt, who all received the Oak Leaves on this date. On 1 July 1944, Schack was promoted to Hauptmann. On 6 August, he was shot down in his Bf 109 G-6 by North American P-51 Mustang fighters behind enemy lines. On 13 August, Schack became the 28th pilot to claim 150 aerial victories. On 6 October 1944, Schack bailed out from Bf 109 G-6 (Werknummer 165559), the fourth time he was forced to save his life by parachute.

=== Group commander ===
On 16 December 1944, Schack was appointed Gruppenkommandeur (group commander) of the I. Gruppe (1st group) of JG 51 "Mölders", taking command of this unit on 29 December. Schack thus succeeded Major (Major) Erich Leie who was given the position of Geschwaderkommodore of Jagdgeschwader 77 (JG 77—77th Fighter Wing). Command of 9. Staffel was passed on to Leutnant Ludwig Strobel. At the time, I. Gruppe was located on various airfields in West Prussia and fighting in the Courland Pocket and was subordinated to Luftflotte 6 (Air Fleet 6). On 23 January 1945, I. and IV. Gruppe moved to an airfield at Danzig-Langfuhr, present-day Wrzeszcz, where the two units were resupplied with new but largely young and inexperienced pilots. At Danzig-Langfuhr, I. Gruppe was placed under the control of II. Fliegerkorps (2nd Air Corps) and fought in support of the evacuation of East Prussia. Because of fuel shortage, Schack was never able to fly missions with more than a few aircraft at a time. This created the impression with the Luftflotte that JG 51 was overstaffed and ordered personnel to be transferred to the infantry. This was a misinterpretation, surplus pilots had been transferred to III. Gruppe which had sustained heavy casualties. Nevertheless, Oberst (Colonel) Otto Weiß, at the time Jagdfliegerführer Westpreußen (commander of the fighter forces of a Luftflotte), threatened Schack with court-martial for failing to comply with an order. From February to early March, I. Gruppe area of operations was predominantly the area of Elbing, present-day Elbląg. Sources vary with respect to the number of aerial victories Schack claimed following his appointment to Gruppenkommandeur. According to Mathews and Foreman, Schack claimed nine aerial victories which includes his 174th and final victory claimed on 7 April 1945. According to Obermaier, Schack claimed thirteen further victories before reaching his total of 174 aerial victories on 7 April 1945.

On 24 March, the airfield at Danzig-Langfuhr came under Soviet artillery attack, killing four and wounding many more. I. Gruppe was ordered to move to Brüsterort, present-day Majak located on the northwestern tip of the Sambia Peninsula, approximately 44 kilometres (27 miles) from Königsberg, to fight in the East Prussian Offensive. Schack, as a native East Prussian and familiar with area, led the ground personnel, towing 40 Bf 109 aircraft of which ten were still serviceable after the trek arrived in Brüsterort. On 12 April 1945, I. Gruppe had one serviceable aircraft remaining in which Schack had to bail out following aerial combat. He suffered serious burns and had to be flown out. Soon after, in late April, the Gruppe was disbanded. On 1 May, Schack was still recovering from his injuries sustained on 12 April, he was named commander of IV. (Sturm) Gruppe of Jagdgeschwader 3 "Udet" (JG 3—3rd Fighter Wing). He succeeded Hauptmann Gerhard Koall who had been killed in action on 27 April. At the time, the Gruppe was based at Rerik. On 2 May, Schack ordered the retreat of IV. (Sturm) Gruppe remnants to Westerland on the island of Sylt. On 4 May, all German forces in northwest Germany including all islands surrendered. The Gruppe remained in Westerland until 20 June when they were brought to the internment camp at Hennstedt.

== Later life ==
Schack was once shot down by Lieutenant Hollis "Bud" Nowlin of the 357th Fighter Group over East Prussia. Nowlin and Schack met again first in Germany and then again in the fall of 1991 at the 357th Fighter Group reunion in Georgia. Living the last years of his life in a forest cabin, Schack died on 14 June 2003 at the age of 85 in Schmidt near Nideggen, Germany.

== Summary of career ==
=== Aerial victory claims ===
According to US historian David T. Zabecki, Schack was credited with 174 aerial victories. Spick also lists him with 174 aerial victories claimed in 780 combat missions, all of which on the Eastern Front. Mathews and Foreman, authors of Luftwaffe Aces — Biographies and Victory Claims, researched the German Federal Archives and state that Schack was credited with more than 174 aerial victories, all of which claimed on the Eastern Front.

Victory claims were logged to a map-reference (PQ = Planquadrat), for example "PQ 47593". The Luftwaffe grid map (Jägermeldenetz) covered all of Europe, western Russia and North Africa and was composed of rectangles measuring 15 minutes of latitude by 30 minutes of longitude, an area of about 360 square miles (930 km^{2}). These sectors were then subdivided into 36 smaller units to give a location area 3 km × 4 km (1.9 mi × 2.5 mi) in size.

Chronicle of aerial victories
This and the ♠ (Ace of spades) indicates those aerial victories which made Schack an "ace-in-a-day", a term which designates a fighter pilot who has shot down five or more airplanes in a single day. This and the ? (question mark) indicates information discrepancies listed by Prien, Stemmer, Rodeike, Balke, Bock, Mathews and Foreman.
Claim	Date	Time	Type	Location	Claim	Date	Time	Type	Location
– 7. Staffel of Jagdgeschwader 51 – Operation Barbarossa — 22 June – 5 December 1941
1	23 July 1941	18:59	SB-2	40 km (25 mi) northeast of Babruysk	3	10 November 1941	10:38	U-2	7 km (4.3 mi) west of Serpukhov
2	10 October 1941	08:08	Pe-2	25 km (16 mi) northeast of Yukhnov					
– 7. Staffel of Jagdgeschwader 51 – Winter War — 6 December 1941 – 30 April 1942
4	11 February 1942	13:20	Pe-2	45 km (28 mi) northeast of Rzhev	5	3 March 1942	13:55	I-26 (Yak-1)	5 km (3.1 mi) south of Mishnkowa
– 7. Staffel of Jagdgeschwader 51 – Eastern Front — 1 May 1942 – 3 February 1943
6	1 August 1942	14:10	Il-2	20 km (12 mi) northeast of Rzhev	19♠	17 December 1942	11:58	Pe-2	25 km (16 mi) northeast of Sychyovka
7	10 August 1942	10:57	Il-2	24 km (15 mi) northeast of Rzhev; 25 km (16 mi) west-southwest of Staritsa	20♠	17 December 1942	11:59	Pe-2	27 km (17 mi) northeast of Sychyovka
8	12 August 1942	06:10	Pe-2	10 km (6.2 mi) east of Zubtsov	21♠	17 December 1942	12:00	Pe-2	35 km (22 mi) northeast of Sychyovka
9	13 August 1942	08:23	Pe-2	21 km (13 mi) north of Rzhev	22♠	17 December 1942	12:01	Pe-2	23 km (14 mi) northeast of Sychyovka
10	18 August 1942	15:05	Pe-2	PQ 47593, Rzhev	23♠	17 December 1942	12:15	Pe-2	20 km (12 mi) south of Zubtsov
11	27 August 1942	09:25	MiG-3	PQ 47613; 25 km (16 mi) west-southwest of Staritsa	24	29 January 1943	08:31	Pe-2	PQ 63632, southeast of Oryol; 10 km (6.2 mi) east of Glazunovka
12	3 September 1942	14:23	Pe-2	27 km (17 mi) east of Sychyovka	25	29 January 1943	08:32	Pe-2	PQ 63644, southeast of Oryol; 20 km (12 mi) north of Maloarkhangelsk
13	3 September 1942	14:24	Pe-2	30 km (19 mi) east of Sychyovka	26	29 January 1943	08:33	Pe-2	PQ 63444, southeast of Oryol; 20 km (12 mi) north of Maloarkhangelsk
14	10 September 1942	07:10	Pe-2	9 km (5.6 mi) southwest of Zubtsov	27	29 January 1943	08:34	Pe-2	PQ 63444, southeast of Oryol; 20 km (12 mi) north of Maloarkhangelsk
15	10 September 1942	16:28	Pe-2	15 km (9.3 mi) northeast of Gzhatsk	28	2 February 1943	13:21	I-153	PQ 73583, southwest of Livny; 25 km (16 mi) southwest of Livny
16	11 September 1942	12:50	LaGG-3	5 km (3.1 mi) northeast of Rzhev	29	3 February 1943	08:17	Il-2	PQ 73384, northwest of Livny; 25 km (16 mi) south-southwest of Russiky Brod
17	22 September 1942	09:26	R-5	30 km (19 mi) northeast of Rzhev; 25 km (16 mi) west-southwest of Staritsa	30	3 February 1943	08:21	Il-2	PQ 73354, northwest of Livny; 20 km (12 mi) southwest of Russiky Brod
18	15 October 1942	15:15	Il-2	20 km (12 mi) west of Bely					
– 7. Staffel of Jagdgeschwader 51 – Eastern Front — 4 February – March 1943
31	21 February 1943	06:25	La-5	PQ 35 Ost 64641, 10 km (6.2 mi) north of Mtsensk	39	8 March 1943	09:15	La-5	PQ 35 Ost 63252, 12 km (7.5 mi) southwest of Novosil; 15 km (9.3 mi) southeast of Zalegoshch
32? (Note: According to Mathews and Foreman this claim was confirmed. Prien, Stemmer, Rodeike and Bock list this claim as unconfirmed.)	21 February 1943	06:26	La-5	PQ 35 Ost 64641, 12 km (7.5 mi) north of Mtsensk	40	8 March 1943	12:20	Il-2	PQ 35 Ost 62263, 15 km (9.3 mi) southwest of Novosil; 25 km (16 mi) east-southeast of Zalegoshch
33♠	23 February 1943	06:30	Il-2	PQ 35 Ost 54173, 20 km (12 mi) east of Zhizdra	41	8 March 1943	12:50	LaGG-3	PQ 35 Ost 63292, 10 km (6.2 mi) southwest of Novosil; 25 km (16 mi) southeast of Zalegoshch
34♠	23 February 1943	09:33	La-5	PQ 35 Ost 44294, 15 km (9.3 mi) east of Zhizdra	42	9 March 1943	07:33	Il-2	PQ 35 Ost 63251, 25 km (16 mi) southwest of Novosil; 15 km (9.3 mi) southeast of Zalegoshch
35♠	23 February 1943	12:25	LaGG-3	PQ 35 Ost 54182, 35 km (22 mi) east-northeast of Zhizdra	43	9 March 1943	07:36	Il-2	PQ 35 Ost 63251, 22 km (14 mi) southwest of Novosil; 15 km (9.3 mi) southeast of Zalegoshch
36♠	23 February 1943	12:26	LaGG-3	PQ 35 Ost 54183, 30 km (19 mi) east-northeast of Zhizdra	44	9 March 1943	07:43	La-5	PQ 35 Ost 63254, 20 km (12 mi) southwest of Novosil; 15 km (9.3 mi) southeast of Zalegoshch
37♠	23 February 1943	12:26	LaGG-3	PQ 35 Ost 54183, 33 km (21 mi) east-northeast of Zhizdra	45	11 March 1943	13:23	R-5	PQ 35 Ost 63631, 25 km (16 mi) northwest of Maloarkhangelsk; 25 km (16 mi) east-northeast of Maloarkhangelsk
38	24 February 1943	06:25	Il-2	PQ 35 Ost 54151, 33 km (21 mi) northeast of Zhizdra; 25 km (16 mi) south-southwest of Sukhinichi	46	11 March 1943	13:27	Il-2	PQ 35 Ost 63283, 30 km (19 mi) southwest of Novosil; 20 km (12 mi) south-southeast of Zalegoshch
– 8. Staffel of Jagdgeschwader 51 – Eastern Front — July – 22 August 1943
47	15 July 1943	15:33	LaGG-3	PQ 35 Ost 54498, 9 km (5.6 mi) northwest of Bolkhov	66	8 August 1943	18:15	LaGG-3	PQ 35 Ost 35481, 30 km (19 mi) east of Yelnya
48	15 July 1943	15:38	MiG-3	PQ 35 Ost 54483, 19 km (12 mi) northwest of Bolkhov	67	8 August 1943	18:17	La-5	PQ 35 Ost 35499, 50 km (31 mi) east-southeast of Yelnya
49	15 July 1943	15:45	Yak-1	PQ 35 Ost 54479, 24 km (15 mi) west-northwest of Bolkhov	68	9 August 1943	12:50	Il-2 m.H. (Note: The "m.H." refers to an Ilyushin Il-2 with rear gunner (mit Heckschütze).)	PQ 35 Ost 35494, 43 km (27 mi) east of Yelnya; 20 km (12 mi) north-northwest of Spas-Demensk
50	15 July 1943	18:22	La-5	PQ 35 Ost 74747, 12 km (7.5 mi) north of Novosil; 25 km (16 mi) south-southwest of Lipitsy	69	10 August 1943	14:50	Il-2	PQ 35 Ost 35665, 42 km (26 mi) northwest of Kirov; 10 km (6.2 mi) west of Spas-Demensk
51	19 July 1943	12:05	LaGG-3	PQ 35 Ost 63221, 9 km (5.6 mi) north of Maloarkhangelsk; 10 km (6.2 mi) east of Zalegoshch	70	10 August 1943	16:45	Il-2 m.H.	PQ 35 Ost 35424, 42 km (26 mi) southeast of Dorogobush; 40 km (25 mi) north-northwest of Spas-Demensk
52	20 July 1943	18:15	La-5	PQ 35 Ost 54628, 15 km (9.3 mi) southwest of Bolkhov	71	12 August 1943	09:07	La-5	PQ 35 Ost 35493, 51 km (32 mi) east of Yelnya
53	20 July 1943	18:18	Il-2 m.H.	PQ 35 Ost 54443, 30 km (19 mi) northwest of Bolkhov; 25 km (16 mi) northeast of Dudrovskiy	72	12 August 1943	16:00	LaGG-3	PQ 35 Ost 45727, 12 km (7.5 mi) north of Kirov
54	21 July 1943	19:35	La-5	PQ 35 Ost 43826, 40 km (25 mi) northeast of Zhizdra; 20 km (12 mi) south-southwest of Sukhinichi	73	13 August 1943	09:53	La-5	20 km (12 mi) northeast of Dukhovshchina
55	22 July 1943	15:50	LaGG-3	PQ 35 Ost 63215, 30 km (19 mi) west of Novosil vicinity of Zalegoshch	74	13 August 1943	09:56	La-5	27 km (17 mi) northeast of Dukhovshchina
56	30 July 1943	12:04	La-5	PQ 35 Ost 64549, 15 km (9.3 mi) southeast of Bolkhov; 10 km (6.2 mi) west of Telchje	75	13 August 1943	15:03	La-5	29 km (18 mi) east-southeast of Dukhovshchina
57	1 August 1943	10:10	La-5	PQ 35 Ost 64515, 3 km (1.9 mi) east-northeast of Bolkhovv	76	13 August 1943	16:48	La-5	15 km (9.3 mi) north-northwest of Dukhovshchina
58	1 August 1943	10:11	La-5	PQ 35 Ost 64519, 8 km (5.0 mi) east-southeast of Bolkhov	77	14 August 1943	09:00	LaGG-3	9 km (5.6 mi) west-southwest of Spas-Demensk
59	2 August 1943	05:36	La-5	PQ 35 Ost 63312, 24 km (15 mi) south of Oryol; 20 km (12 mi) southwest of Zmiyovka	78	15 August 1943	05:12	La-5	1 km (0.62 mi) north of Spas-Demensk
60	2 August 1943	17:10	Il-2 m.H.	PQ 35 Ost 54841, 45 km (28 mi) northwest of Oryol; 20 km (12 mi) southeast of Znamenskoye	79	19 August 1943	11:45	La-5	PQ 35 Ost 35444, 24 km (15 mi) east-northeast of Yelnya
61	2 August 1943	19:10	La-5	PQ 35 Ost 53457, 12 km (7.5 mi) south of Kromy	80	19 August 1943	16:31	LaGG-3	PQ 35 Ost 35473, 30 km (19 mi) east of Yelnya
62	2 August 1943	19:13	La-5	PQ 35 Ost 53453, 6 km (3.7 mi) southwest of Kromy	81	19 August 1943	19:02	LaGG-3	PQ 35 Ost 35641, 30 km (19 mi) southeast of Yelnya
63	7 August 1943	15:55	LaGG-3	PQ 35 Ost 45587, 20 km (12 mi) north-northwest of Kirov	82	20 August 1943	18:36	Il-2 m.H.	PQ 35 Ost 35671, 35 km (22 mi) southeast of Yelnya
64	8 August 1943	11:58	Il-2 m.H.	PQ 35 Ost 26859, 9 km (5.6 mi) east-northeast of Yartsevo	83	22 August 1943	06:25	P-39	PQ 35 Ost 43835, 27 km (17 mi) east-northeast of Sevsk
65	8 August 1943	13:05	Yak-9	PQ 35 Ost 26699, 28 km (17 mi) north-northeast of Yartsevo	84	22 August 1943	15:45	La-5	PQ 35 Ost 43826, 22 km (14 mi) east-northeast of Sevsk
– 7. Staffel of Jagdgeschwader 51 – Eastern Front — 23 August – 15 October 1943
85	23 August 1943	15:15	La-5	4 km (2.5 mi) north of Duchowtschschina; 15 km (9.3 mi) northeast of Moschna	100	6 September 1943	15:20	Yak-7	28 km (17 mi) west of Seredyna-Buda
86	23 August 1943	17:57	La-5	10 km (6.2 mi) east of Duchowtschschina; 20 km (12 mi) north-northwest of Yartsevo	101	9 September 1943	15:20	Yak-9	PQ 35 Ost 33887, 29 km (18 mi) east of Novgorod
87	24 August 1943	14:00	La-5	22 km (14 mi) south-southeast of Duchowtschschina; 20 km (12 mi) north of Yartsevo	102	13 September 1943	15:45	La-5	6 km (3.7 mi) southwest of Ordshonikidsgrad
88	27 August 1943	07:55	Pe-2	PQ 35 Ost 43768, 8 km (5.0 mi) southwest of Sevsk	103	18 September 1943	10:12	La-5	PQ 35 Ost 35561, 21 km (13 mi) south-southeast of Yelnya
89	27 August 1943	10:03	LaGG-3	PQ 35 Ost 43844, 2 km (1.2 mi) southeast of Sevsk	104	18 September 1943	17:00	La-5	PQ 35 Ost 35514, 17 km (11 mi) south of Yelnya
90	27 August 1943	13:20	Il-2 m.H.	PQ 35 Ost 43817, 3 km (1.9 mi) northeast of Sevsk	105	18 September 1943	17:16	Yak-7	PQ 35 Ost 35377, 12 km (7.5 mi) southwest of Yelnya
91	27 August 1943	18:33	LaGG-3	PQ 35 Ost 43758, 18 km (11 mi) southwest of Sevsk	106	19 September 1943	16:58	La-5	PQ 35 Ost 25473, 36 km (22 mi) west of Yelnya
92	28 August 1943	15:58	Il-2 m.H.	PQ 35 Ost 43758, 20 km (12 mi) southwest of Sevsk	107	20 September 1943	09:33	La-5	PQ 35 Ost 25613, 50 km (31 mi) southeast of Smolensk
93	29 August 1943	12:34	Il-2 m.H.	PQ 35 Ost 42133, 20 km (12 mi) south of Sevsk	108	20 September 1943	16:13	Yak-7	PQ 35 Ost 25611, 25 km (16 mi) west of Yelnya
94	29 August 1943	12:35	Il-2 m.H.	PQ 35 Ost 42133, 20 km (12 mi) south of Sevsk	109	20 September 1943	16:20	Il-2 m.H.	PQ 35 Ost 25483, 43 km (27 mi) southeast of Smolensk
95	29 August 1943	14:36	La-5	PQ 35 Ost 43787, 19 km (12 mi) southeast of Seredyna-Buda	110	4 October 1943	12:43	Yak-7	PQ 25 Ost 92651, 20 km (12 mi) east of Woroschep
96	30 August 1943	12:31	La-5	20 km (12 mi) south of Seredyna-Buda	111	4 October 1943	15:32	Il-2 m.H.	PQ 35 Ost 02536, 55 km (34 mi) west of Tschernigow
97	1 September 1943	11:10	Yak-7	PQ 35 Ost 32258, 20 km (12 mi) northwest of Gluchow	112	5 October 1943	15:58	Yak-7	PQ 35 Ost 02626, 30 km (19 mi) west of Tschernigow vicinity of Ippernigno
98	3 September 1943	10:23	La-5	PQ 35 Ost 42317, 12 km (7.5 mi) east of Gluchow	113	10 October 1943	15:25	Yak-7	PQ 35 Ost 06158, 28 km (17 mi) southeast of Nevel
99	6 September 1943	11:32	Yak-4	PQ 35 Ost 33675, 34 km (21 mi) northeast of Novgorod	114	14 October 1943	11:14	Yak-7	PQ 35 Ost 15532, 47 km (29 mi) southwest of Smolensk
– 9. Staffel of Jagdgeschwader 51 – Eastern Front — 8–31 December 1943
115	15 December 1943	09:03	Yak-7	PQ 25 Ost 93486, 45 km (28 mi) southwest of Zhlobin	117	15 December 1943	11:37	Yak-7	PQ 25 Ost 93277, 36 km (22 mi) southwest of Zhlobin
116	15 December 1943	11:23	Il-2	PQ 25 Ost 93457, 42 km (26 mi) southwest of Zhlobin	118	28 December 1943	11:28	Il-2	PQ 25 Ost 93452, 36 km (22 mi) southwest of Zhlobin
– 9. Staffel of Jagdgeschwader 51 – Eastern Front — 1 January – 29 September 1944
119	10 January 1944	14:19	Yak-9	PQ 35 Ost N/05215, 34 km (21 mi) southeast of Vitebsk; 15 km (9.3 mi) west-southwest of Liozna	143	1 August 1944	11:00	La-5	PQ 25 Ost 25437; 25 km (16 mi) east-southeast of Blumenfeld
120	10 January 1944	14:44	Yak-9	PQ 35 Ost N/06769, 16 km (9.9 mi) south of Vitebsk; 15 km (9.3 mi) southeast of Vitebsk	144	1 August 1944	11:07	Yak-9	PQ 25 Ost 25491; 25 km (16 mi) east of Trakehnen
121? (Note: According to Mathews and Foreman this claim was confirmed. Prien, Stemmer, Balke and Bock list this claim as unconfirmed.)	12 January 1944	11:14	La-5	PQ 25 Ost 93611, 24 km (15 mi) east of Azarychy; 40 km (25 mi) south-southeast of Parichi	145	2 August 1944	10:36	Yak-9	PQ 25 Ost 24433; 15 km (9.3 mi) south-southeast of Augustow
122	12 January 1944	11:30	Yak-9	PQ 25 Ost 93475, 23 km (14 mi) northeast of Azarychy; 30 km (19 mi) south-southeast of Parichi	146	2 August 1944	10:39	Il-2	PQ 25 Ost 24434; 15 km (9.3 mi) south of Augustow
123	13 January 1944	13:02	Pe-2	21 km (13 mi) east-northeast of Kalinkavichy; 20 km (12 mi) northeast of Mazyr	147	12 August 1944	12:37	Il-2 m.H.	PQ 25 Ost 24624; 45 km (28 mi) north-northwest of Białystok
124	15 January 1944	14:20	Yak-9	PQ 25 Ost 93447, 25 km (16 mi) east-northeast of Azarychy; 30 km (19 mi) south-southeast of Parichi	148	12 August 1944	16:56	Yak-9	PQ 25 Ost 24697; 20 km (12 mi) northwest of Białystok
125	16 January 1944	09:55	Il-2 m.H.	PQ 25 Ost 93626, 50 km (31 mi) southwest of Zhlobin; 40 km (25 mi) southeast of Parichi	149	13 August 1944	14:57	Il-2 m.H.	PQ 25 Ost 24626, Suwałki; 45 km (28 mi) north-northwest of Białystok
126	6 February 1944	09:28	La-5	PQ 25 Ost 96654, 40 km (25 mi) northwest of Vitebsk; 15 km (9.3 mi) southwest of Gorodok	150	17 August 1944	06:55	Yak-9	PQ 25 Ost 36347; 45 km (28 mi) north-northeast of Nemakščiai
127	6 February 1944	11:20	Yak-9	PQ 25 Ost 96692, 24 km (15 mi) northwest of Vitebsk; 20 km (12 mi) northwest of Vitebsk	151	17 August 1944	16:10	La-5	PQ 25 Ost 26283; 30 km (19 mi) southeast of Telsche
128	6 February 1944	11:35	Yak-9	PQ 25 Ost 96657, 42 km (26 mi) northwest of Vitebsk; 15 km (9.3 mi) southwest of Gorodok	152	19 August 1944	17:04	Yak-9	PQ 25 Ost 36319; 25 km (16 mi) southwest of Schaulen
129	21 February 1944	15:30	Yak-9	PQ 35 Ost 03149, 9 km (5.6 mi) east of Slonim vicinity of Zhlobin	153	19 August 1944	17:12	Il-2 m.H.	PQ 25 Ost 36345; 20 km (12 mi) west-northwest of Marijampolė
130	21 February 1944	15:32	Yak-9	PQ 35 Ost 03176, 10 km (6.2 mi) north-northeast of Strešyn; 10 km (6.2 mi) south of Zhlobin	154	23 August 1944	19:05	Yak-9	PQ 25 Ost 27491; 50 km (31 mi) south-southwest of Tukums
131	21 February 1944	15:41	Pe-2	PQ 35 Ost 04726, 21 km (13 mi) northeast of Rahachow; 20 km (12 mi) north-northeast of Rahachow	155	26 August 1944	19:08	Yak-9	PQ 25 Ost 27437; 20 km (12 mi) west-southwest of Tukums
132	23 February 1944	14:37	La-5	PQ 35 Ost 04543, 8 km (5.0 mi) south-southwest of Stara Bychow; 20 km (12 mi) southwest of Stara Bychow	156	27 August 1944	18:59	P-39	PQ 25 Ost 37518; 40 km (25 mi) southwest of Schaulen
133	30 April 1944	10:19	Yak-7	PQ 25 Ost 42841, 16 km (9.9 mi) southwest of Novosil; 15 km (9.3 mi) southwest of Kovel	157	28 August 1944	12:32	Yak-9	PQ 25 Ost 37514; 40 km (25 mi) southwest of Schaulen
134	30 May 1944	16:55	Yak-7	PQ 25 Ost 42735, 25 km (16 mi) west of Kovel vicinity of Lubomi	158	28 August 1944	16:04	P-39	PQ 25 Ost 37343; 35 km (22 mi) west-southwest of Mitau
135	25 June 1944	07:38	La-5	PQ 25 Ost 93193, Rahachow vicinity of Parichi	159	29 August 1944	18:27	La-5	PQ 25 Ost 37373; 40 km (25 mi) west-southwest of Mitau
136	25 June 1944	13:35	Pe-2	PQ 25 Ost 93221; 20 km (12 mi) west-northwest of Zhlobin	160	16 September 1944	09:33	Yak-9	PQ 25 Ost 17383; 10 km (6.2 mi) east of Libau
137	25 June 1944	13:47	P-39	PQ 25 Ost 94863; 10 km (6.2 mi) west of Rahachow	161	16 September 1944	09:45	Yak-9	PQ 25 Ost 17628; 45 km (28 mi) east-southeast of Libau
138	28 June 1944	15:11	P-39	PQ 25 Ost 84829; 25 km (16 mi) southwest of Swistlotsch	162	16 September 1944	17:01	Yak-9	PQ 25 Ost 17665; 60 km (37 mi) east-southeast of Libau
139	4 July 1944	12:23	Il-2 m.H.	PQ 25 Ost 62131; 25 km (16 mi) north-northeast of Kursk	163	16 September 1944	17:07	Yak-9	PQ 25 Ost 27537; 55 km (34 mi) north-northeast of Telsche
140	7 July 1944	19:07	La-5	PQ 25 Ost 54719; 15 km (9.3 mi) northeast of Karachev	164	29 September 1944	11:00	Pe-2	PQ 25 Ost 27594; 15 km (9.3 mi) southeast of Telsche
141	16 July 1944	18:26	La-5	PQ 25 Ost 50356; 25 km (16 mi) northwest of Ternopil	165	29 September 1944	11:20	Pe-2	PQ 25 Ost 17628; 45 km (28 mi) east-southeast of Libau
142	26 July 1944	13:18? (Note: According to Mathews and Foreman claimed at 13:29.)	Yak-9	PQ 25 Ost 40119; 15 km (9.3 mi) northeast of Kowna					
– I. Gruppe of Jagdgeschwader 51 – Eastern Front — 1945
According to Mathews and Foreman, aerial victories 166 to 173 were not documented.
	7 April 1945	—	La-5	southeast of Heiligenbeil	174	7 April 1945	—	unknown	

=== Awards ===
- Iron Cross (1939)
  - 2nd Class (10 August 1941)
  - 1st Class (15 June 1942)
- Honour Goblet of the Luftwaffe on 25 January 1943 as Feldwebel and pilot (Note: According to Obermaier on 16 January 1943.)
- German Cross in Gold on 26 February 1943 as Feldwebel in the III./Jagdgeschwader 51
- Knight's Cross of the Iron Cross with Oak Leaves
  - Knight's Cross on 29 October 1943 as Leutnant (war officer) and pilot in the 9./Jagdgeschwader 51 "Mölders"
  - 460th Oak Leaves on 20 April 1944 as Leutnant (war officer) and Staffelkapitän of the 9./Jagdgeschwader 51 "Mölders"

== Works ==
- Schack, Günther (1995). Betet für die Juden, betet für die Christen [Pray for the Jews, pray for the Christians]. Nideggen. ISBN 978-3-9800329-3-3.
- Schack, Günther (1975). Die Homokratie im Erdkreis [The Homocracy on the Globe]. OCLC 722175749
- Schack, Günther (1975). Die Homokratie im Lebenskreis [The Homocracy in the Circle of Life]. OCLC 614208466
- Schack, Günther (1975). Die Homokratie im Völkerkreis [The Homocracy in the Circle of People]. OCLC 38961146
