= Macarius Oksiyuk =

Ukrainian Orthodox metropolitan bishop (1884–1961)

His Eminence Macarius
- Metropolitan of Warsaw and All Poland
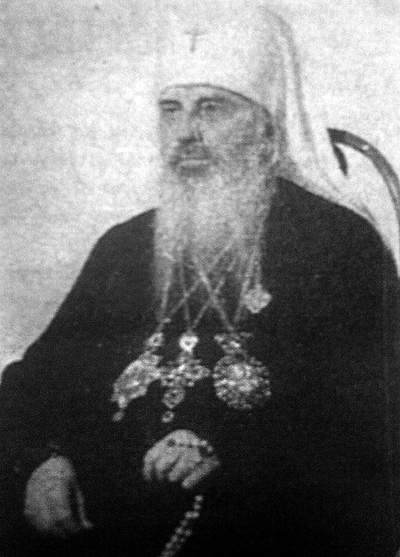
- Church: Polish Orthodox Church; Russian Orthodox Church
- Installed: 1951
- Term ended: 1959
- Predecessor: Timothy Szretter
- Successor: Timothy Szretter
- Other posts: Metropolitan of Lviv and Ternopol

Orders
- Ordination: 6 July 1942 by Panteleimon (Rudyk) (Ukrainian Autonomous Orthodox Church)
- Consecration: 29 April 1945 by Patriarch Alexy I of Moscow
- Rank: Metropolitan

Personal details
- Born: Mykhailo Fedorovych Oksiyuk; 29 September 1884 Łukowisko, Siedlce Governorate, Russian Empire
- Died: 2 March 1961 (aged 76) Odesa, Soviet Union
- Denomination: Eastern Orthodoxy

Metropolitan Macarius, secular name Mykhailo Fedorovych Oksiyuk (Ukrainian: Михайло Федорович Оксіюк, Polish: Michał Oksijuk; 29 September 1884 – 1 March 1961) was a Ukrainian religious leader in Poland and the Soviet Union, a primate of the Polish Orthodox Church as Metropolitan of Warsaw and all Poland. Even though his brother Joseph was a bishop of the Ukrainian Autocephalous Orthodox Church in the 1920s, following the World War II, Mykhailo Oksiyuk made an excellent career as a religious functionary. As Metropolitan of Warsaw and All Poland, Macarius did not accept a Polish citizenship, remaining a citizen of the Soviet Union.

Born as Mykhailo Oksiyuk in Łukowisko, Siedlce Governorate (part of Russian Empire) on 29 September 1884 in a rich peasant family, in 1897-1901 he studied at the Warsaw Theological School. In 1907 he graduated the Chełm Theological Seminary where one of his teachers was Dionysius (Waledyński). In 1911 Oksiyuk graduated the Kiev Theological Academy as a candidate of Theology and later stayed in the academy acting as a docent of the Department of Old Christian Literature (Patrology and Byzantinology). In 1914 he was confirmed as a full pledged docent and received a title of Magister of Theology for his work "Gregory of Nyssa Eschatology". In 1917 Oksiyuk was confirmed as an extraordinary professor in the Kiev Theological Academy remaining there until 1922. Simultaneously in 1918-1920 he was a docent of Byzantine history in Kyiv University.

In 1926-1933 Oksiyuk worked in a library of the Ukrainian Academy of Sciences. Later before the World War II, he worked as a clerk at different government institutions. Following the invasion of Nazi Germany of the Soviet Union, Oksiyuk stayed in Kyiv and in 1941-1942 for short time returned to his work in the library of the Ukrainian Academy of Sciences. During that time he also worked at the Kyiv city administration department of culture and education as an instructor of religious dominations section. In 1942 he left his job. Soon after that a road accident killed his wife who was run over in the city by the German vehicle. Oksiyuk decided to return serving God and on 5 July 1942 he was ordained as a deacon by bishop of Lvov Panteleimon (Rudyk) (Ukrainian Autonomous Orthodox Church) and the next day ordained as a priest. Until 1943 Mykhailo Oksiuk was a parson at the Intercession of the Theotokos temple at the Kyiv's Podil. From 1943 he was a protoiereus at the Demetrius Church at Podil.

In 1943-1944 Nazi Germany was driven out of Ukraine. In 1945 with the Ukrainian Exarchate was established eparchy of Lvov-Ternopol which was covering four oblasts: Lviv, Drohobych, Stanislav, Ternopil. Those were territories dominated by Greek-Catholics, but in order to statistically increase number of Orthodox faithful, Ternopil Oblast was established with territories of southern Volhynia which contained Pochaiv Lavra.

In April 1945 the Russian Orthodox Church Holy Synod appointed protoiereus Mykhailo Oksiyuk a bishop of Lvov-Ternopol. On 20 April he was tonsured as Macarius in a rank of archimandrite and on 22 April he was ordained as bishop at the Yelokhovo Cathedral by Patriarch Alexy I of Moscow, Metropolitan of Kiev and Galicia John (Sokolov), Bishop of Chișinău and All Moldova Hieronim (Zakharov). Oksiyuk was also appointed as a holiest archimandrite of Pochaiv Lavra. Already on 29 April 1945 he was dispatched to Lviv. His arrival to Lviv coincided with detention of Metropolitan of Galicia Joseph (Slipyj) and start of the Soviet campaign of liquidation of the Ukrainian Greek Catholic Church through a union. Selection of Oksiyuk was not accidental. Discovery of supporting documents in the Security Service of Ukraine archives (former Kiev KGB Archives) showed that Oksiyuk was a NKVD agent under pseudonym "Glebov" (Gliebov) and had a trust within the Soviet special services. Oksiyuk was vouched by the People's Commissar of State Security (NKVD) of Ukrainian SSR General-Lieutenant Sergei Savchenko to the head of the 2nd Directorate of NKVD (counterintelligence) Pyotr Fedotov. Those documents also indicated that Oksiyuk was sent to Western Ukraine deliberately for the "liquidation of uniates" (Uniates those who joined the Union of Brest).

Through his fluency in Ukrainian language, Macarius was effective in earning trust among Greek Catholic clergy. He was an honorary guest at a gathering knows as "Lvov Assembly" on 6 March 1946 where the Union of Brest was proclaimed invalid. On 9 March he played a key role in organization of the "unification of the Ukrainian Greek Catholic Church with the Russian Orthodox Church".

== See also ==
- Ukrainian Greek Catholic Church in the Soviet Union
