= Karl Borris =

German fighter ace and Knight's Cross recipient (1916–1981)

- Born: 3 January 1916; Heinsdorf
- Died: 18 August 1981 (aged 65); Bornum
- Military career
- Allegiance: Nazi Germany
- Branch: Luftwaffe
- Service years: 1939–1945
- Rank: Major (major)
- Unit: JG 26 "Schlageter"
- Commands: 8./JG 26, I./JG 26
- Conflicts: See battles World War II: Battle of France; Battle of Dunkirk; Battle of Britain; Defense of the Reich; Dieppe Raid; Schweinfurt–Regensburg mission; Operation Bodenplatte
- Awards: Knight's Cross of the Iron Cross

Karl Borris (3 January 1916 – 18 August 1981) was a World War II Luftwaffe military aviator and test pilot. As a flying ace, he is credited with 43 victories, all of them over the Western Front, for which he was awarded the Knight's Cross of the Iron Cross, the highest award in the military and paramilitary forces of Nazi Germany during World War II. Borris was involved in the introduction of the Focke-Wulf Fw 190 to front line service. Borris and 30 other pilots, technicians and engineers extensively tested the Fw 190 and their input was used in the decision to continue the project.

== World War II ==
World War II in Europe began on Friday 1 September 1939 when German forces invaded Poland. On 1 December 1939, Leutnant Borris joined Jagdgeschwader 26 "Schlageter" (JG 26—26th Fighter Wing), which had been named after Albert Leo Schlageter on 1 May 1939. There, he was assigned to II. Gruppe (2nd group). At the time, the Geschwader was commanded by Oberst Eduard Ritter von Schleich and II. Gruppe was led by Hauptmann Herwig Knüppel. The Gruppe was based at Werl and patrolled western German border during the "Phoney War" without having contact with the enemy. On 27 January, II. Gruppe was ordered to Dortmund where it stayed until 9 May 1940.

During the Battle of France on 13 May, Borris was shot down in his Messerschmitt Bf 109 E-3 by a Boulton Paul Defiant fighter near Dordrecht. He managed to bail out, was injured and returned to his Staffel on 17 May. According to Mathews and Foremann, his victor was either Flight Lieutenant Ken Gillies from No. 66 Squadron or Pilot Officer P. E. J. Greenhous from No. 264 Squadron. Prior to this mission, Borris had attended a gas-protection course in Berlin. Command of II. Gruppe changed frequently in 1940. On 19 May, Knüppel was killed in action, he was temporarily replaced by Hauptmann Karl Ebbinghausen until he was appointed Staffelkapitän (squadron leader) of 4. Staffel on 31 May. On 1 June, command of II. Gruppe was officially handed over to Hauptmann Erich Noack. Noack was killed in a landing accident on 24 July, and command of II. Gruppe was again given to Ebbighausen, who was then killed in action on 16 August. Hauptmann Erich Bode then led the Gruppe until 3 October when Hauptmann Walter Adolph was given command.

Borris claimed his first aerial victory on 1 June during the Battle of Dunkirk. He was credited with the destruction of a Royal Air Force (RAF) Supermarine Spitfire at 12:42 over the combat area of Dunkirk. The next day, II. Gruppe again fought over the Dunkirk battle zone and Borris claimed his second aerial victory. At 09:10, he claimed a Spitfire which came from either No. 66, No. 266 or No. 611 Squadron.

During the Battle of Britain, Borris was credited with two aerial victories on 13 August, a day that was codenamed Adlertag (Eagle Day) by the Luftwaffe. II. Gruppe made contact with Hawker Hurricane fighters from No. 56 Squadron over Maidstone and for the loss of one Bf 109 E-1 shot down, claimed two Hurricanes destroyed, both of them by Borris between Maidstone and Detling. On 6 September, he claimed another Hurricane shot down. This Hurricane was a No. 501 Squadron aircraft and was claimed at 09:55 near Folkestone. Borris claimed his final aerial victory of the Battle of Britain on 25 October. On an escort mission for fighter bombers from II. Gruppe of Lehrgeschwader 2 (LG 2—2nd Demonstration Wing), Borris claimed the destruction of a No. 603 Squadron Spitfire near Maidstone.

=== Testing the Fw 190 ===
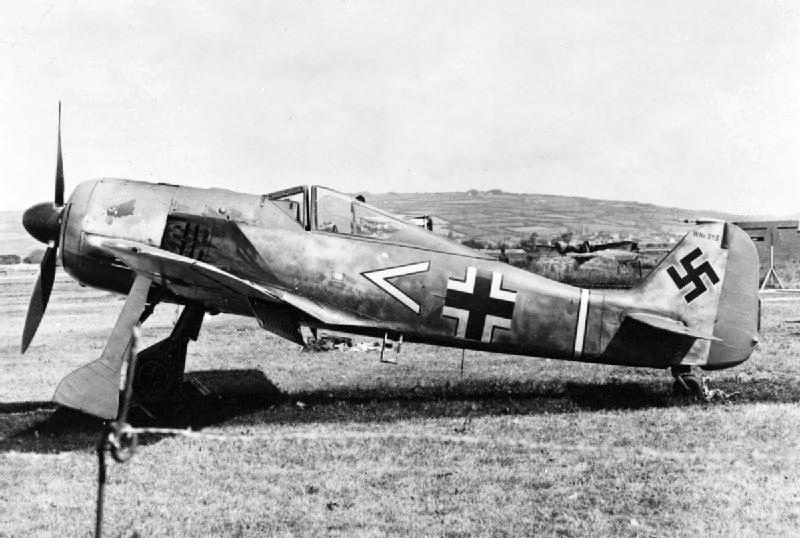
A Focke-Wulf Fw 190 fighter similar to those flown by Borris

On 5 March 1941, Borris, at the time the technical officer of II. Gruppe, and Oberleutnant Otto Behrens, the Staffelkapitän of 6. Staffel, were sent to the Luftwaffe main testing ground (Erprobungsstelle) for new aircraft designs at Rechlin for operational testing of the then new Focke-Wulf Fw 190. Both Borris and Behrens were prewar aircraft mechanics and headed a team of 30 mechanics and engineers. The unit was given six pre-production Fw 190 A-0 fighters for evaluation and conducted numerous test flights and made various suggestions which proved vital to working out all the technical challenges associated with a new aircraft design.

The Erprobungsstaffel 190, the operational Fw 190 test squadron, headed by Behrens, was ordered from Rechlin to the Le Bourget airfield near Paris on 1 August. There, they were tasked with training II. Gruppe of JG 26 on the Fw 190 A-1. Borris was transferred to the 6. Staffel which at the time was commanded by Oberleutnant Walter Schneider and was based at an airfield in Moorsele Belgium. 6. Staffel was the first operational unit to be equipped with the Fw 190. By September, the entire II. Gruppe was flying the Fw 190. On 9 August, he claimed his first aerial victory on the Fw 190. That day, the RAF had sent a "Rodeo" to Neufchâtel-Hardelot and Borris claimed a No. 403 Squadron Spitfire shot down near Campagne. On 20 September, the RAF Fighter Command flew three "Circuses" simultaneously; No. 100A targeted the Hazebrouck motor yards, No. 100B the Abbeville motor yards, and No. 100C hit the Rouen shipyards. In defence of this attack, Borris was credited with destruction of Spitfire, claimed at 16:57 near Mardyck. The next day, "Circus" No. 101 consisting of twelve Bristol Blenheim bombers and escorted by fourteen squadrons of Spitfires and Hurricanes which targeted Béthune and Gosnay. In combat over Étaples, Borris managed to shoot down a No. 315 Polish Fighter Squadron Spitfire at 16:30.

=== Squadron leader ===
On 6 November 1941, Hauptmann Johann Schmid, the Staffelkapitän of 8. Staffel, was killed in action. In consequence, Borris was transferred and chosen as his successor. 8. Staffel was a squadron of III. Gruppe and at the time commanded by Major Gerhard Schöpfel. Borris claimed his first aerial victory whilst flying with 8. Staffel on 13 March 1942. By this date, his Fw 190 had been equipped with the FuG 25a Erstling, an identification friend or foe transponder, allowing German radar operators to distinguish between friendly and enemy aircraft. That day, the RAF sent "Circus" No. 114 to bomb the railway yards at Hazebrouck. III. Gruppe was dispatched and fought a lengthy air battle with the Kenley Wing. During this air battle, Borris downed a No. 602 Squadron Spitfire for his tenth aerial victory.

During the Dieppe Raid on 19 August 1942, on III. Gruppe's second patrol of the day, a flight led by Borris and Oberleutnant Klaus Mietusch took off from Wevelgem airfield at 09:36. The flight intercepted Spitfire fighters from No. 19 and No. 121 Squadron, an Eagle Squadron. In this encounter, Borris claimed a Spitfire shot down at 10:15 in the vicinity of Dieppe. Following this 21st aerial victory claim, he was awarded the German Cross in Gold (Deutsches Kreuz in Gold) on 8 September.

=== Defense of the Reich ===
On 14 May 1943, the United States Army Air Forces (USAAF) targeted four separate targets in Germany, Belgium and the Netherlands. In defense of this attack, Borris was shot down in his Fw 190 A-5 (Werknummer 7326—factory number) by the defensive gunfire of a Boeing B-17 Flying Fortress bomber in combat near Wevelgem. He managed to bail out at 7,000 meters (23,000 feet) but opened his parachute too soon, causing it to partially collapse. He sustained multiple broken bones, requiring a lengthy period in hospitals and convalescence. On 22 June, Major Fritz Losigkeit the commander of I. Gruppe was transferred. In consequence, Oberst Josef Priller, the Geschwaderkommodore (wing commander) of JG 26, was forced to appoint a new Gruppenkommandeur (group commander). While Borris was still in a hospital, Priller called him and gave him command of I. Gruppe.

24 July marked the beginning of a period in the Combined Bomber Offensive which was referred to as "Blitz Week". As part of the offensive, the next day, U.S. Martin B-26 Marauder bombers attacked the Ghent coke furnaces. I. Gruppe, led by Borris, was scrambled at Woensdrecht to intercept the attack on Ghent. The Gruppe engaged the escorting fighters and claimed four Spitfires destroyed plus a further Spitfire damaged, without loss. Following this aerial battle, Borris was credited with two aerial victories over two No. 165 Squadron Spitfires claimed shot down north of Ghent at 15:04 and 15:09 respectively. The USAAF targeted the German aircraft industry on 17 August 1943 in the Schweinfurt–Regensburg mission. In defense of this attack, Borris, who had returned to his unit, claimed the first of 60 B-17 bombers lost by the USAAF that day. At 11:30, he had shot down a B-17 from the 94th Bombardment Group which came down 10 kilometres (6.2 miles) east of Diest.

On 1 April 1944, Borris was promoted to Major. A little more than a month later on 14 May, Borris briefly left I. Gruppe and transferred command to Hauptmann Hermann Staiger. Borris returned to JG 26 on 14 July, and resumed command of I. Gruppe on 1 August after Staiger had been transferred on 31 July. On 17 September, Allied forces launched Operation Market Garden, the operation to secure a bridgehead over the River Rhine. As part of this operation, the Allies flew resupplies to the combat area around Arnhem on 23 September. The transport aircraft were protected by 519 fighters from the VIII Fighter Command and 40 Lockheed P-38 Lightning fighters from the Ninth Air Force. German fighters dispatched by Luftflotte Reich never reached the transports. Borris led I. Gruppe to the Goch–Wesel area where he shot down a North American P-51 Mustang fighter from the 339th Fighter Group.

=== Operation Bodenplatte and defeat ===
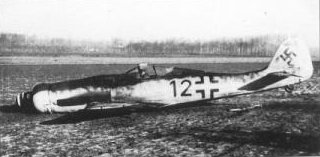
A Fw 190 D-9 of 10./JG 54, piloted by Leutnant Theo Nibel, downed by a partridge which flew into the nose radiator

On 24 November 1944, Priller with his Geschwaderstab of JG 26 and Borris with his I. Gruppe moved to an airfield near Handrup and Fürstenau. The next day, two pilots of JG 26 were awarded the Knight's Cross of the Iron Cross (Ritterkreuz des Eisernen Kreuzes), Borris for 41 aerial victories, and Leutnant Heinz-Gerhard Vogt from 5. Staffel for 46 aerial victories. The presentation of the Knight's Cross was made by Oberst Hannes Trautloft, at the time Inspekteur der Tagjäger (Inspector of Day Fighters), at Fürstenau airfield on 5 December. Following the presentation, Borris led a flight of five Fw 190s against a formation of B-17s bombing Berlin and managed to shoot down a straggler from the 452d Bombardment Group west of Lingen. At Fürstenau airfield, the Gruppe was equipped with the Fw 190 D-9 aircraft and flew twelve combat missions in support of the Ardennes Counteroffensive, also known as the Battle of the Bulge. In these missions, Borris lost eight pilots killed in action, five were wounded and a further four pilots were taken prisoner of war (POW).

On 31 December, 20 Fw 190 aircraft from III. Gruppe of Jagdgeschwader 54 (JG 54—54th Fighter Wing) under the command of Oberleutnant Hans Dortenmann arrived at Fürstenau in preparation for Operation Bodenplatte. Bodenplatte was an attempt at gaining air superiority during the stagnant stage of the Battle of the Bulge. That evening, Borris briefs the pilots of the mission, which is the Grimbergen Airfield. Led by Priller and Borris, 47 aircraft from the Geschwaderstab and I. Gruppe, and further 17 aircraft from III. Gruppe of JG 54 took off at 08:14 on 1 January 1945. Flying at an altitude of approximately 50–150 metres (160–490 feet), the attack force sustained losses during the approach to the target area, largely due to anti-artillery fire. The airfield at Gimbergen was almost completely abandoned, the damage inflicted was minimal, and the losses sustained where significant. III. Gruppe of JG 54 suffered five pilots killed or missing in action, plus four further taken prisoner of war, Borris lost six pilots either killed or missing in action, making the mission a total failure.

Borris claimed his 43rd and last aerial victory on 14 January and German forces were on the retreat in the Ardennes. At 15:25, Borris led a flight of 31 Fw 190 D-9s from Fürstenfeld, three Fw 190 had to abort the mission prematurely, on mission to protect the German jet bomber airfields in the vicinity of Rheine–Hopsten. Borris and his flight of 28 aircraft encountered Spitfires of the Second Tactical Air Force with the two Norwegian squadrons No. 331 and No. 332 Squadron. In this encounter, Borris claimed a Spitife shot down at 15:45 in the vicinity of Ibbenbüren.

Based at Flensburg Airfield, Borris surrendered I. Gruppe to British forces on 6 May 1945. He and his men were taken to a makeshift POW camp nearby.

== Summary of career ==
=== Aerial victory claims ===
According to Obermaier, Borris was credited with 43 aerial victories, including four four-engined heavy bombers, all of which claimed over the Western Front. Mathews and Foreman, authors of Luftwaffe Aces: Biographies and Victory Claims, researched the German Federal Archives and found records for 43 aerial victory claims, all of which were claimed on the Western Front.

Victory claims were logged to a map-reference (PQ = Planquadrat), for example "PQ 05 Ost BE". The Luftwaffe grid map (Jägermeldenetz) covered all of Europe, western Russia and North Africa and was composed of rectangles measuring 15 minutes of latitude by 30 minutes of longitude, an area of about 360 square miles (930 km^{2}). These sectors were then subdivided into 36 smaller units to give a location area 3 km × 4 km (1.9 mi × 2.5 mi) in size.

Chronicle of aerial victories
This and the – (dash) indicates unconfirmed aerial victory claims for which Borris did not receive credit. This and the ? (question mark) indicates information discrepancies listed by Caldwell, Prien, Stemmer, Rodeike, Bock, Mathews and Foreman.
Claim	Date	Time	Type	Location	Claim	Date	Time	Type	Location
– 5. Staffel of Jagdgeschwader 26 "Schlageter" – Battle of France — 10 May – 25 June 1940
1	1 June 1940	12:42	Spitfire? (Note: According to Mathews and Foreman claimed as a Hawker Hurricane.)	northwest of Dunkirk	2	2 June 1940	09:10	Hurricane? (Note: According to Caldwell, Mathews and Foreman claimed as a Supermarine Spitfire.)	Dunkirk
– 4. Staffel of Jagdgeschwader 26 "Schlageter" – Action at the Channel and over England — 26 June – September 1940
3	13 August 1940	17:05	Hurricane	Maidstone/Detling	5	6 September 1940	09:55	Hurricane	Folkestone; 30 km (19 mi) northwest of Folkestone
4	13 August 1940	17:07	Hurricane	Maidstone/Detling; Maidstone/Ashford					
– 4. Staffel of Jagdgeschwader 26 "Schlageter" – Action at the Channel and over England — September 1940 – 21 June 1941
6	25 October 1940	11:04	Spitfire	Maidstone					
– 6. Staffel of Jagdgeschwader 26 "Schlageter" – On the Western Front — 22 June – 31 December 1941
7	9 August 1941	18:30	Spitfire	Campagne	9	21 September 1941	16:30	Spitfire	Étaples
8	20 September 1941? (Note: According to Mathews and Foreman claimed on 10 September 1941.)	16:57	Spitfire	Mardyck					
– 8. Staffel of Jagdgeschwader 26 "Schlageter" – On the Western Front — 1 January – 31 December 1942
10	13 March 1942	16:09	Spitfire		16	28 April 1942	11:34	Spitfire	south of Gravelines
11	4 April 1942	11:40	Spitfire	Pas-de-Calais	17	28 April 1942	11:59	Spitfire	
12	4 April 1942	11:46	Spitfire	3 km (1.9 mi) north of Sangatte	18	17 May 1942	11:50	Spitfire	6 km (3.7 mi) northwest of Sangatte
13	15 April 1942	19:04	Spitfire	east of Cap Gris-Nez	19	1 June 1942	13:58	Spitfire	8 km (5.0 mi) north of De Panne
14	17 April 1942	16:14	Spitfire	English Channel	20	30 July 1942	19:20	Spitfire	
15	24 April 1942	14:50	Spitfire	75 km (47 mi) west-northwest of Ostend	21	19 August 1942	10:15	Spitfire	Dieppe
– 8. Staffel of Jagdgeschwader 26 "Schlageter" – On the Western Front — 1 January – 22 June 1943
22	3 February 1943	15:21	Spitfire	north of Poperinge	25	4 April 1943	14:40	B-17	Rouen/Dieppe
23	3 February 1943	15:21	Spitfire	north of Poperinge	26	13 May 1943	16:45	Spitfire	Saint-Pol
24	7 February 1943	14:46	Typhoon	PQ 05 Ost BE, Roeselare/Staden					
– Stab I. Gruppe of Jagdgeschwader 26 "Schlageter" – On the Western Front — 22 June 1943 – 8 May 1945
27	25 July 1943	15:04	Spitfire	north of Ghent	— (Note: This claim is not listed by Mathews and Foreman.)	6 March 1944	14:35	P-47	southwest of Oldenburg
28	25 July 1943	15:09	Spitfire	north of Ghent	36	8 March 1944	16:50	Spitfire	east of Utrecht
29	17 August 1943	11:30	B-17	10 km (6.2 mi) east of Diest	37	19 April 1944	19:05	Spitfire	east-northeast of Mechelen
30	19 September 1943	12:52	Spitfire	east of Ipswich	38	14 July 1944	14:36	P-47	west of Paris
31	7 January 1944	12:30	P-47	vicinity of Cousolre	39	26 August 1944	09:32	Spitfire	Rouen
32	11 January 1944	13:00? (Note: According to Mathews and Foreman claimed at 13:25.)	B-17	Nordhorn-Zuiderzee	40	16 September 1944	17:40	P-38	Bonn
33	29 January 1944	11:05	B-17	east of Bonn	41	23 September 1944	17:09	P-51	Wesel
34	8 February 1944	11:15? (Note: According to Mathews and Foreman claimed at 11:20.)	P-47	east of Saint-Quentin	42	5 December 1944	13:35	B-17	west of Lingen
35	24 February 1944	13:05	P-47	north of Rheine	43	14 January 1945	15:45	Spitfire	Ibbenbüren

=== Awards ===
- Iron Cross (1939)
  - 2nd Class (7 September 1940)
  - 1st Class (5 September 1941)
- Honor Goblet of the Luftwaffe on 25 May 1942 as Oberleutnant and Staffelkapitän
- German Cross in Gold on 8 September 1942 as Oberleutnant in the 8./Jagdgeschwader 26 (Note: According to Obermaier on 21 September 1942.)
- Knight's Cross of the Iron Cross on 25 November 1944 as Major and Gruppenkommandeur of I./Jagdgeschwader 26 "Schlageter"

== Notes ==
Military offices
Preceded by Hauptmann Fritz Losigkeit	Commander of I. Gruppe of Jagdgeschwader 26; 23 June 1943 – 14 May 1944	Succeeded by Hauptmann Hermann Staiger
Preceded by Hauptmann Hermann Staiger	Commander of I. Gruppe of Jagdgeschwader 26; 1 August 1944 – 7 May 1945	Succeeded by None
