= Gmina Międzyrzec Podlaski =

Gmina Międzyrzec Podlaski Międzyrzec Podlaski Commune
- Gmina
- Coat of arms
- Interactive map of Gmina Międzyrzec Podlaski
- Coordinates (Międzyrzec Podlaski): 51°59′0″N 22°47′0″E
- Country: Poland
- Voivodeship: Lublin
- County: Biała County
- Seat: Międzyrzec Podlaski

Area
  - Total: 261.58 km^{2} (101.00 sq mi)

Population (2014)
  - Total: 10,539
  - Density: 40.290/km^{2} (104.35/sq mi)
- Website: https://www.miedzyrzecgmina.pl

Gmina Międzyrzec Podlaski is a rural gmina (administrative district) in Biała County, Lublin Voivodeship, in eastern Poland. Its seat is the town of Międzyrzec Podlaski, although the town is not part of the territory of the gmina.

The gmina covers an area of 261.58 square kilometres (101.0 sq mi), and as of 2006 its total population is 10,313 (10,539 in 2014).

== Villages ==
Gmina Międzyrzec Podlaski contains the villages and settlements of Bereza, Dołhołęka, Halasy, Jelnica, Kolonia Wolańska, Koszeliki, Kożuszki, Krzewica, Krzymoszyce, Łuby, Łukowisko, Łuniew, Manie, Misie, Pościsze, Przychody, Przyłuki, Puchacze, Rogoźnica, Rogoźnica-Kolonia, Rogoźniczka, Rudniki, Rzeczyca, Sawki, Sitno, Strzakły, Tłuściec, Tuliłów, Utrówka, Wólka Krzymowska, Wysokie, Żabce, Zaścianki, Zasiadki and Zawadki.

== Neighbouring gminas ==
Gmina Międzyrzec Podlaski is bordered by the town of Międzyrzec Podlaski and by the gminas of Biała Podlaska, Drelów, Huszlew, Kąkolewnica Wschodnia, Olszanka, Trzebieszów and Zbuczyn.
