= Przyłuki =

- Village
- Location within Poland
- Coordinates: 52°3′59″N 22°46′59″E
- Country: Poland
- Voivodeship: Lublin
- County: Biała
- Gmina: Międzyrzec Podlaski

Przyłuki [pʂɨˈwukʲi] is a village in the administrative district of Gmina Międzyrzec Podlaski, within Biała County, Lublin Voivodeship, in eastern Poland.
