= Wysokie, Gmina Międzyrzec Podlaski =

Wysokie
- Village
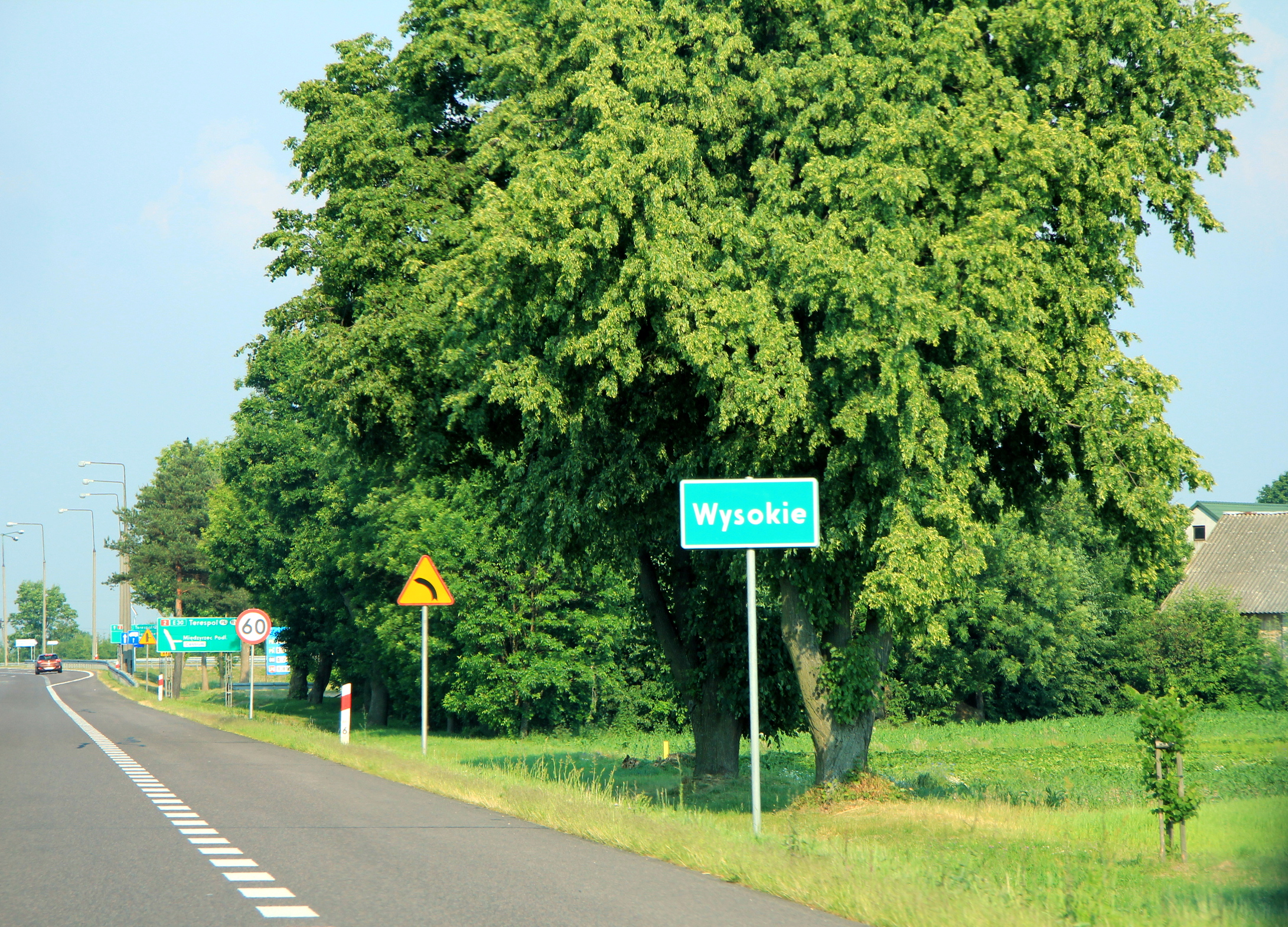

- Location within Poland
- Coordinates: 51°59′54″N 22°49′17″E
- Country: Poland
- Voivodeship: Lublin
- County: Biała
- Gmina: Międzyrzec Podlaski

Wysokie [vɨˈsɔkʲɛ] is a village in the administrative district of Gmina Międzyrzec Podlaski, within Biała County, Lublin Voivodeship, in eastern Poland.
