= Rogoźniczka =

- Village
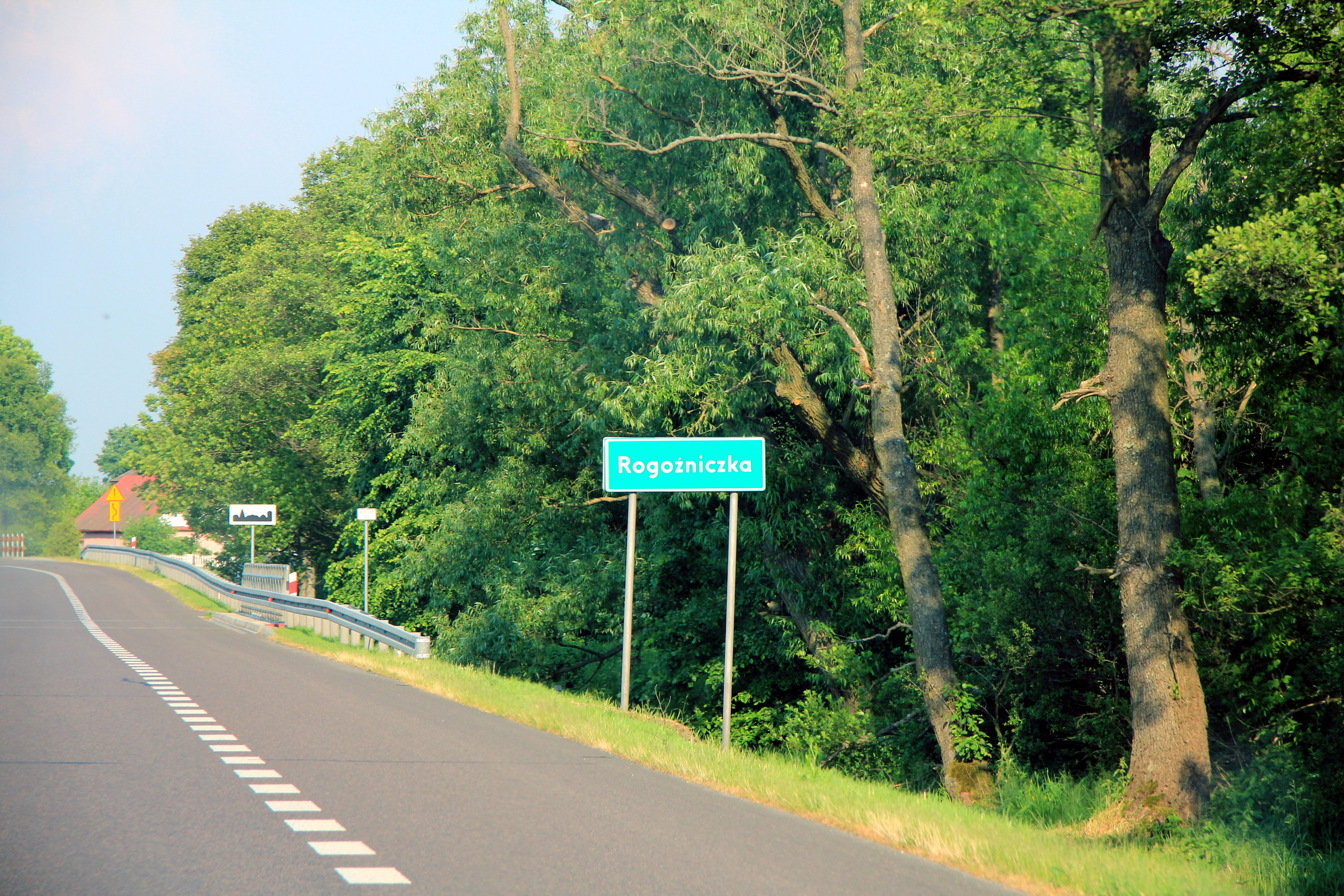

- Location within Poland
- Coordinates: 52°01′46″N 22°52′56″E
- Country: Poland
- Voivodeship: Lublin
- County: Biała
- Gmina: Międzyrzec Podlaski

Rogoźniczka [rɔɡɔʑˈɲit͡ʂka] is a village in the administrative district of Gmina Międzyrzec Podlaski, within Biała County, Lublin Voivodeship, in eastern Poland.
