= Przychody, Lublin Voivodeship =

Przychody
- Village
- Location within Poland
- Coordinates: 51°56′56″N 22°39′55″E
- Country: Poland
- Voivodeship: Lublin
- County: Biała
- Gmina: Międzyrzec Podlaski

Population (approx.)
  - Total: 530

Przychody [pʂɨˈxɔdɨ] is a village in the administrative district of Gmina Międzyrzec Podlaski, within Biała County, Lublin Voivodeship, in eastern Poland.
