= Rudniki, Lublin Voivodeship =

Rudniki
- Village
- Location within Poland
- Coordinates: 51°59′56″N 22°50′15″E
- Country: Poland
- Voivodeship: Lublin
- County: Biała
- Gmina: Międzyrzec Podlaski

Rudniki [rudˈɲikʲi] is a village in the administrative district of Gmina Międzyrzec Podlaski, within Biała County, Lublin Voivodeship, in eastern Poland.
