= Dołhołęka =

- Village
- Location within Poland
- Coordinates: 52°05′55″N 22°44′29″E
- Country: Poland
- Voivodeship: Lublin
- County: Biała
- Gmina: Międzyrzec Podlaski

Dołhołęka [dɔu̯xɔˈwɛŋka] is a village in the administrative district of Gmina Międzyrzec Podlaski, within Biała County, Lublin Voivodeship, in eastern Poland.
