= Tłuściec =

- Village
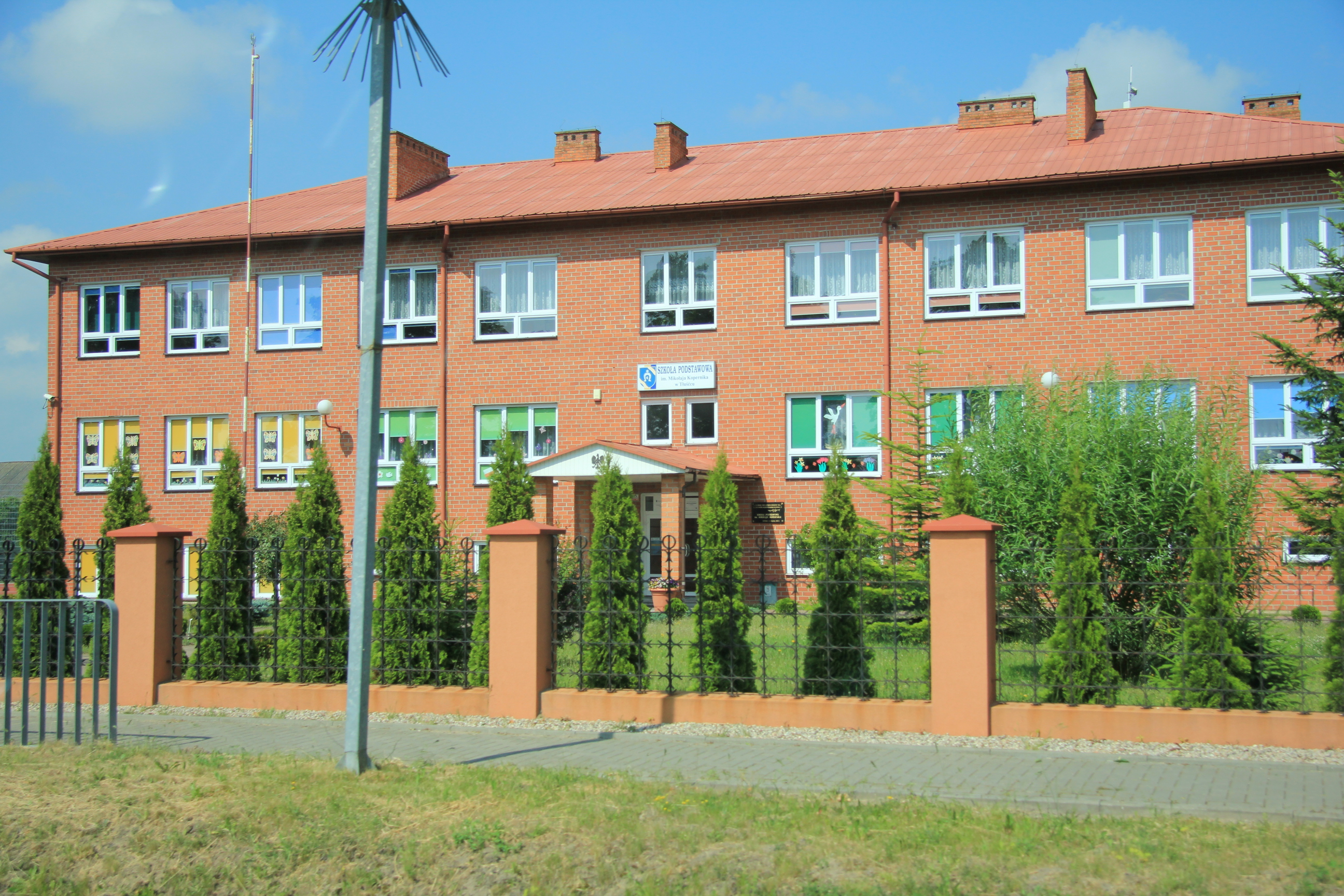

- Location within Poland
- Coordinates: 52°2′N 22°42′E
- Country: Poland
- Voivodeship: Lublin
- County: Biała
- Gmina: Międzyrzec Podlaski

Population
  - Total: 480

Tłuściec [ˈtwuɕt͡ɕɛt͡s] is a village in the administrative district of Gmina Międzyrzec Podlaski, within Biała County, Lublin Voivodeship, in eastern Poland.
