= Puchacze =

- Village
- Location within Poland
- Coordinates: 52°0′20″N 22°54′24″E
- Country: Poland
- Voivodeship: Lublin
- County: Biała
- Gmina: Międzyrzec Podlaski

Puchacze [puˈxat͡ʂɛ] is a village in the administrative district of Gmina Międzyrzec Podlaski, within Biała County, Lublin Voivodeship, in eastern Poland.
