= Zaścianki, Lublin Voivodeship =

Zaścianki
- Village
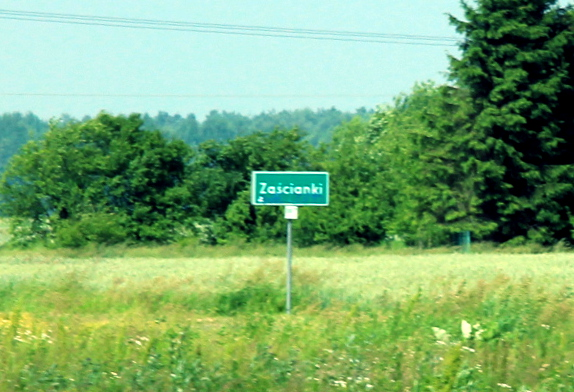

- Location within Poland
- Coordinates: 52°02′11″N 22°46′58″E
- Country: Poland
- Voivodeship: Lublin
- County: Biała
- Gmina: Międzyrzec Podlaski

Zaścianki [zaɕˈt͡ɕaŋkʲi] is a village in the administrative district of Gmina Międzyrzec Podlaski, within Biała County, Lublin Voivodeship, in eastern Poland.
