= Utrówka =

- Village
- Location within Poland
- Coordinates: 51°59′N 22°53′E
- Country: Poland
- Voivodeship: Lublin
- County: Biała
- Gmina: Międzyrzec Podlaski

Utrówka [uˈtrufka] is a village in the administrative district of Gmina Międzyrzec Podlaski, within Biała County, Lublin Voivodeship, in eastern Poland.
