= Misie =

- Village
- Location within Poland
- Coordinates: 51°57′43″N 22°41′12″E
- Country: Poland
- Voivodeship: Lublin
- County: Biała
- Gmina: Międzyrzec Podlaski

Population (approx.)
  - Total: 600

Misie [ˈmʲiɕɛ] is a village in the administrative district of Gmina Międzyrzec Podlaski, within Biała County, Lublin Voivodeship, in eastern Poland.
