= Łukowisko =

- Village
- Location within Poland
- Coordinates: 52°5′N 22°44′E
- Country: Poland
- Voivodeship: Lublin
- County: Biała
- Gmina: Międzyrzec Podlaski

Population
  - Total: 330
- Time zone: UTC+1 (CET)
  - Summer (DST): UTC+2 (CEST)
- Vehicle registration: LBI

Łukowisko [wukɔˈvʲiskɔ] is a village in the administrative district of Gmina Międzyrzec Podlaski, within Biała County, Lublin Voivodeship, in eastern Poland.
