= Jelnica =

- Village
- Location within Poland
- Coordinates: 51°58′30″N 22°42′02″E
- Country: Poland
- Voivodeship: Lublin
- County: Biała
- Gmina: Międzyrzec Podlaski

Jelnica [jɛlˈɲit͡sa] is a village in the administrative district of Gmina Międzyrzec Podlaski, within Biała County, Lublin Voivodeship, in eastern Poland.
