= Łuniew =

- Village
- Location within Poland
- Coordinates: 52°5′N 22°41′E
- Country: Poland
- Voivodeship: Lublin
- County: Biała
- Gmina: Międzyrzec Podlaski

Łuniew [ˈwuɲɛf] is a village in the administrative district of Gmina Międzyrzec Podlaski, within Biała County, Lublin Voivodeship, in eastern Poland.
