= Stara Wieś Pierwsza =

- Village
- Location within Poland
- Coordinates: 50°56′35″N 22°33′48″E
- Country: Poland
- Voivodeship: Lublin
- County: Lublin
- Gmina: Bychawa

Population
  - Total: 486

Stara Wieś Pierwsza [ˈstara ˈvjɛɕ ˈpjɛrfʂa] is a village in the administrative district of Gmina Bychawa, within Lublin County, Lublin Voivodeship, in eastern Poland.
