= Krzewica, Gmina Międzyrzec Podlaski =

Krzewica
- Village
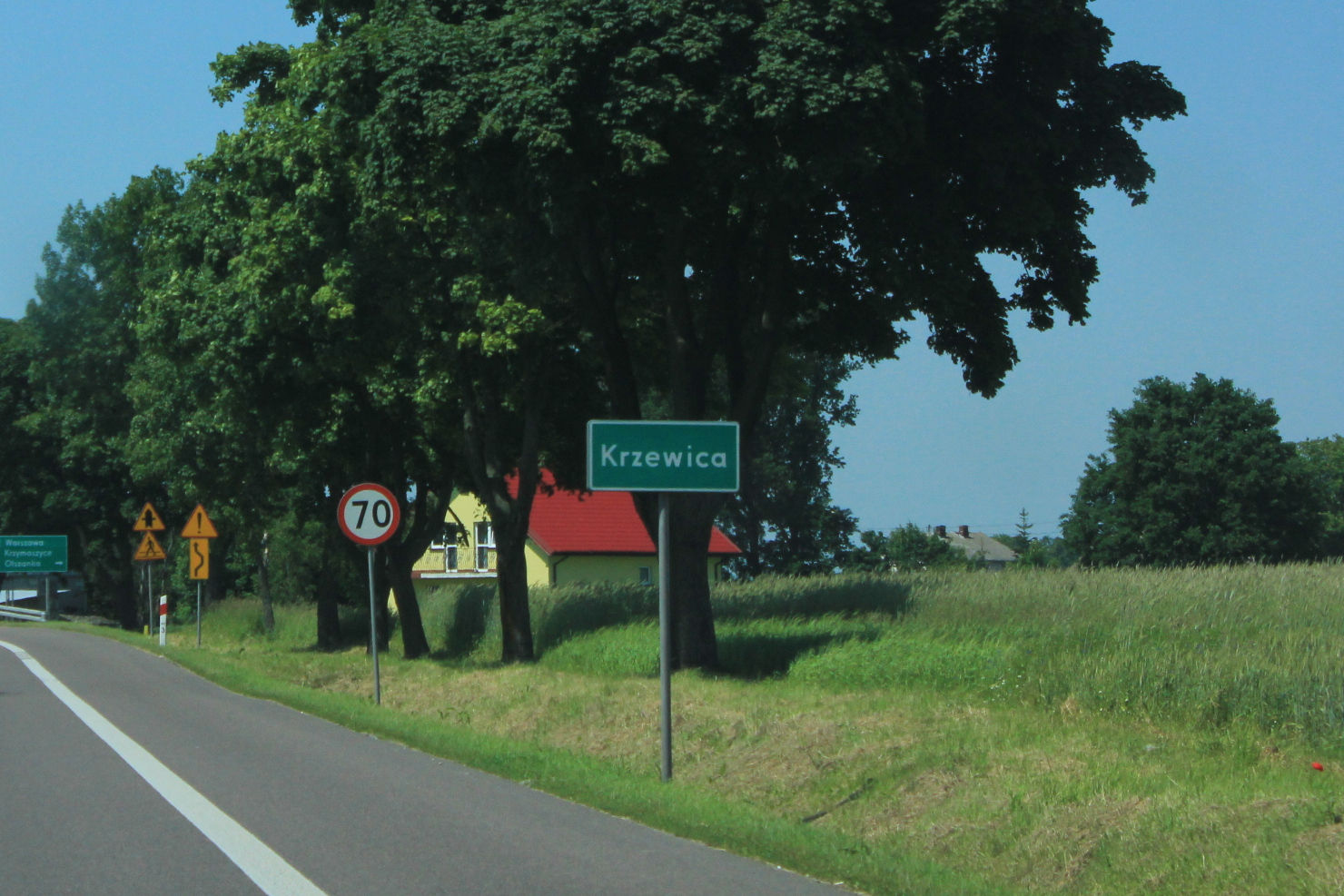

- Location within Poland
- Coordinates: 52°3′32″N 22°40′29″E
- Country: Poland
- Voivodeship: Lublin
- County: Biała
- Gmina: Międzyrzec Podlaski

Population
  - Total: 350
- Time zone: UTC+1 (CET)
  - Summer (DST): UTC+2 (CEST)

Krzewica [kʂɛˈvʲit͡sa] is a village in the administrative district of Gmina Międzyrzec Podlaski, within Biała County, Lublin Voivodeship, in eastern Poland.

== History ==
Six Polish citizens were murdered by Nazi Germany in the village during World War II.
