= Iwanicki =

Coat of arms of Iwanicki noble family

Iwanicki (feminine Iwanicka) is a Polish surname, it originated as a toponymic surname for someone from Iwaniec (now Iwonicz) in Krosno Voivodeship, or Iwanki, Iwanovice, or other places. Notable people include:

- Krzysztof Iwanicki, Polish footballer
- Leszek Iwanicki, Polish footballer
- Piotr Iwanicki, Polish dancer
- Sebastian Iwanicki, Polish footballer
- Stanisław Iwanicki, Polish politician
