= Lachy =

Lachy may refer to:

- Lachy, Marne, a commune in the Marne department in north-eastern France
- Lachy or Lendians, an ancient Polish tribe
- Lachy Sądeckie, the Lachy culture of the Sądeckie region of Poland
- Lachy, Podlaskie Voivodeship, a village in north-eastern Poland

== See also ==
- Lachlan (name), Lachy is a pet form of the name Lachlan
