= Białki =

Białki may refer to the following places:

- Białki, Siedlce County in Masovian Voivodeship (east-central Poland)
- Białki, Wołomin County in Masovian Voivodeship (east-central Poland)
- Białki, Podlaskie Voivodeship (north-east Poland)
- Białki, Pomeranian Voivodeship (north Poland)
