= Waśki =

Waśki may refer to the following places:

- Waśki, Hajnówka County in Podlaskie Voivodeship (north-east Poland)
- Waśki, Kolno County in Podlaskie Voivodeship (north-east Poland)
- Waśki, Mońki County in Podlaskie Voivodeship (north-east Poland)
