= Skaryszewo =

- Village
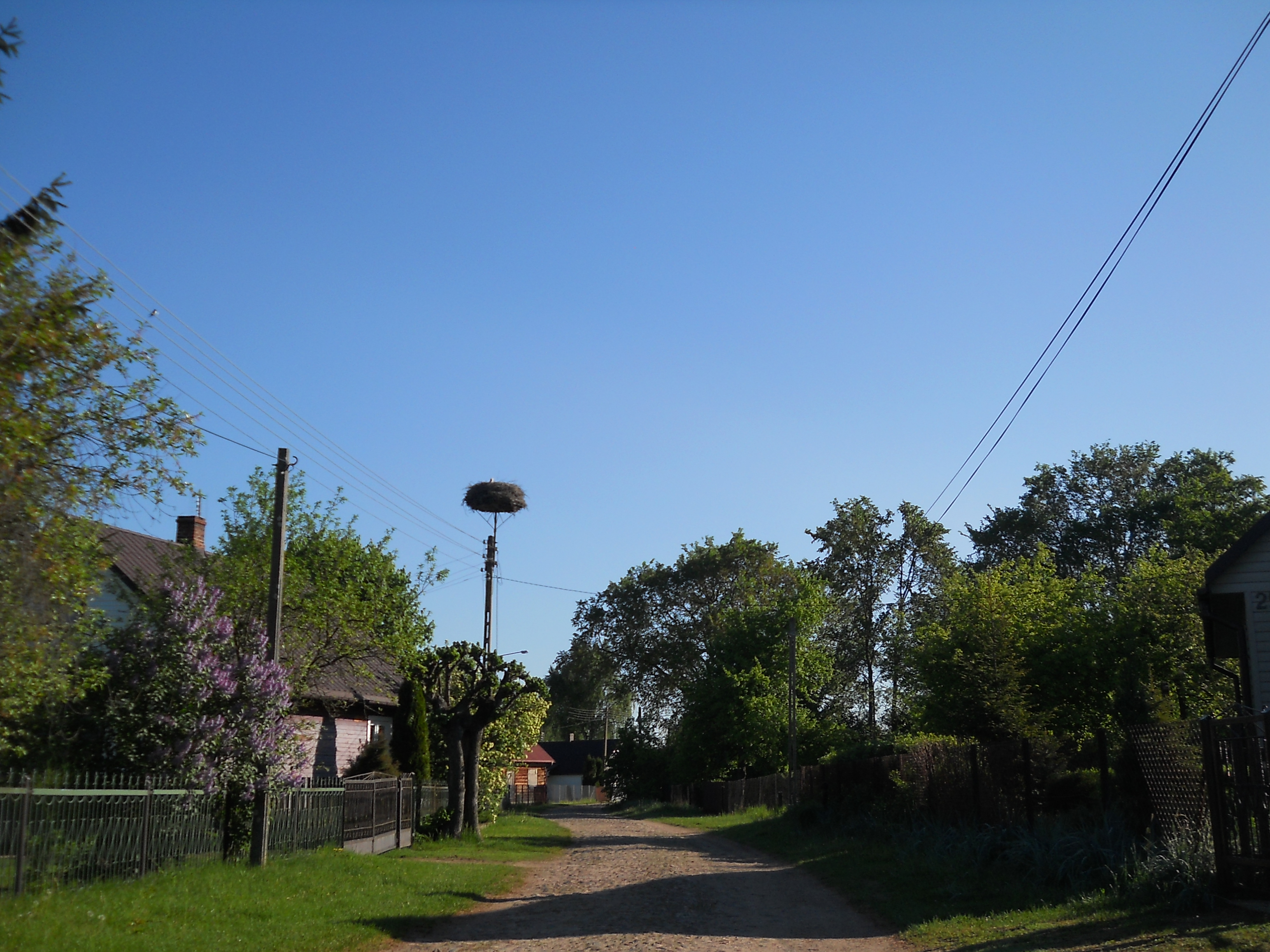
- Road in Skaryszewo

- Location within Poland
- Coordinates: 52°54′01″N 23°28′03″E
- Country: Poland
- Voivodeship: Podlaskie
- County: Hajnówka
- Gmina: Narew
- Population: 15

Skaryszewo [skarɨˈʂɛvɔ] is a village in the administrative district of Gmina Narew, within Hajnówka County, Podlaskie Voivodeship, in north-eastern Poland.
