= Kotłówka, Podlaskie Voivodeship =

Kotłówka
- Village
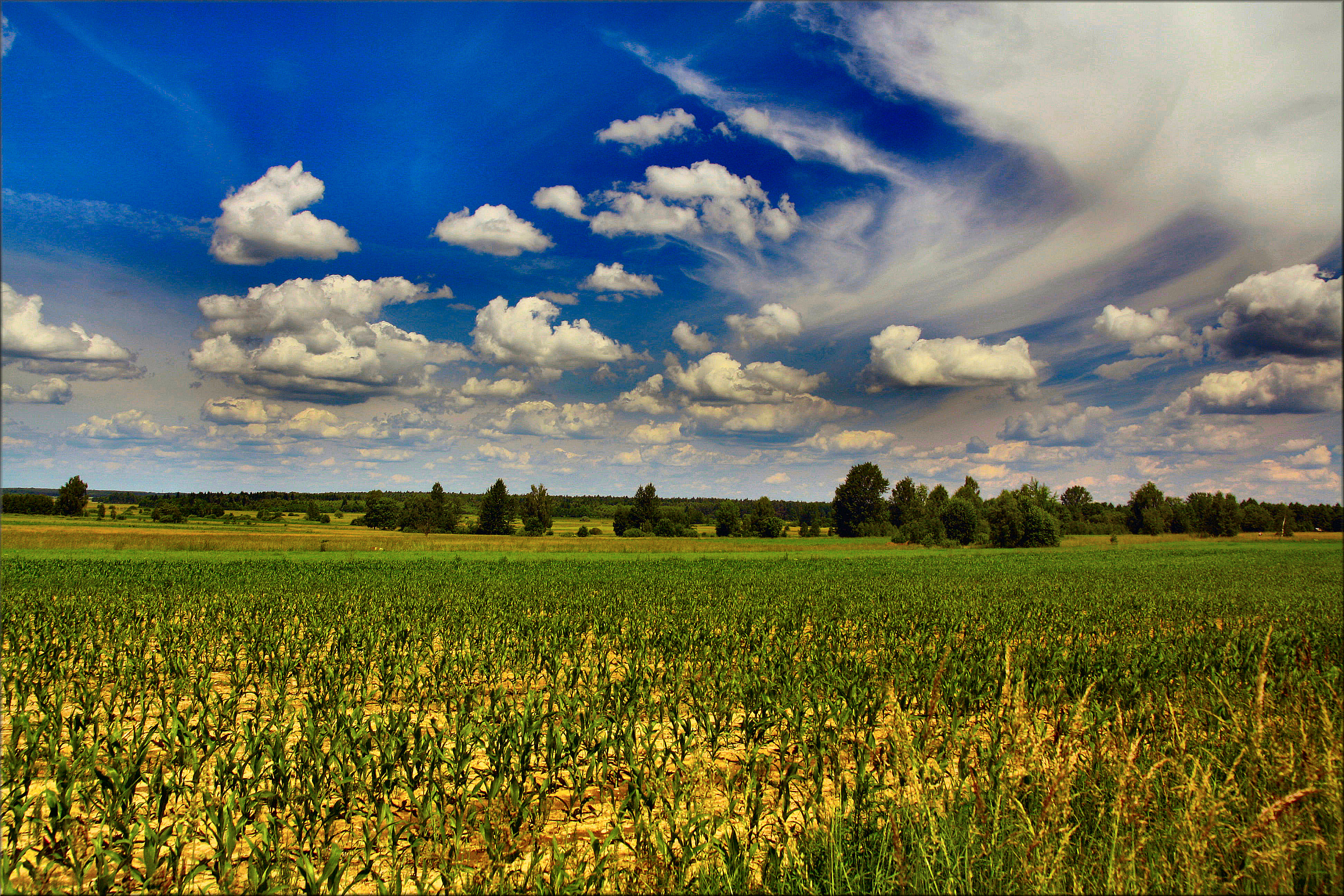

- Location within Poland
- Coordinates: 52°51′N 23°32′E
- Country: Poland
- Voivodeship: Podlaskie
- County: Hajnówka
- Gmina: Narew

Population
  - Total: 80
- Time zone: UTC+1 (CET)
  - Summer (DST): UTC+2 (CEST)

Kotłówka [kɔˈtwufka] is a village in the administrative district of Gmina Narew, within Hajnówka County, Podlaskie Voivodeship, in north-eastern Poland.
