= Koźliki, Hajnówka County =

Koźliki
- Village
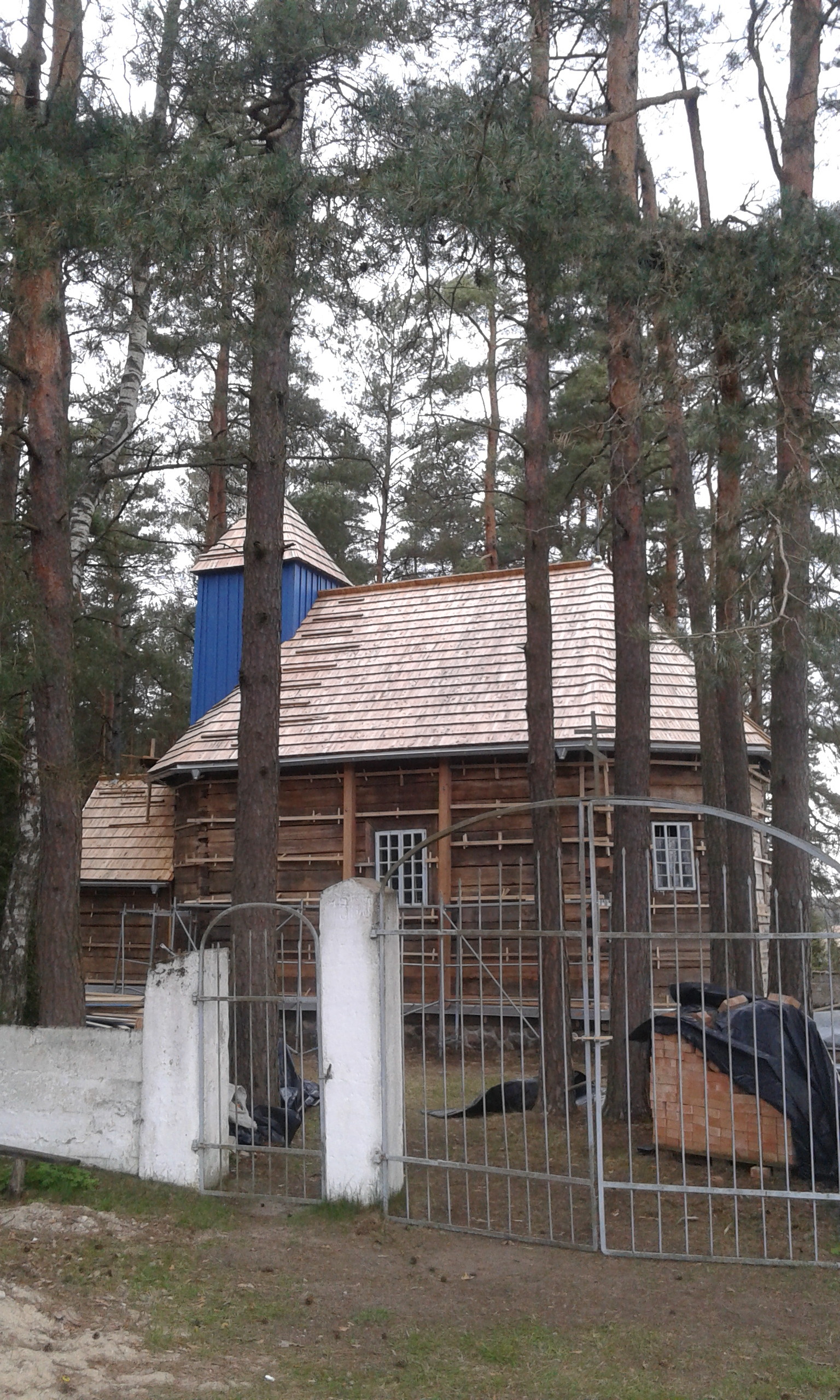
- Saint Nicholas Orthodox church in Koźliki

- Location within Poland
- Coordinates: 52°50′55″N 23°32′06″E
- Country: Poland
- Voivodeship: Podlaskie
- County: Hajnówka
- Gmina: Narew
- Population: 80

Koźliki [kɔˈʑlʲikʲi] is a village in the administrative district of Gmina Narew, within Hajnówka County, Podlaskie Voivodeship, in north-eastern Poland.
