= Kutowa =

- Village
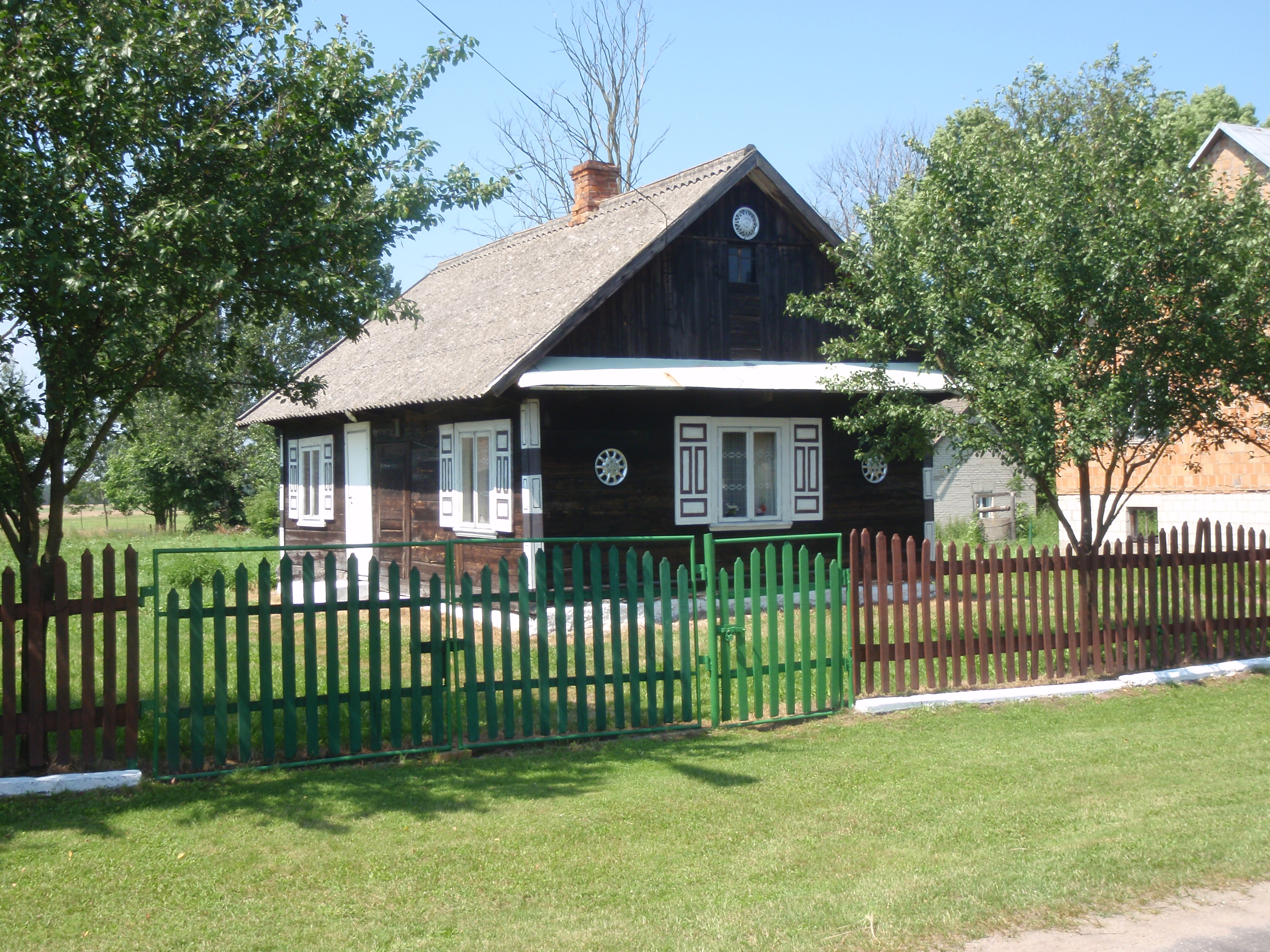
- Wooden house in Kutowa

- Location within Poland
- Coordinates: 52°50′35″N 23°32′36″E
- Country: Poland
- Voivodeship: Podlaskie
- County: Hajnówka
- Gmina: Narew

Kutowa [kuˈtɔva] is a village in the administrative district of Gmina Narew, within Hajnówka County, Podlaskie Voivodeship, in north-eastern Poland.
