= Sebastian Iwanicki =

Polish footballer

Personal information
- Full name: Sebastian Iwanicki
- Date of birth: 3 September 1985 (age 41)
- Place of birth: Warsaw, Poland
- Height: 1.80 m (5 ft 11 in)
- Position: Midfielder

Youth career
- Canet
- Cherbourg
- PL Octeville
- 2001–2002: Agrykola Warsaw

Senior career*
Years	Team	Apps	(Gls)
2002–2004	Legia Warsaw II		
2004	Świt Nowy Dwór	1	(0)
2005	Górnik Zabrze	1	(0)
2005	GLKS Nadarzyn		
2006	Unia Janikowo		
2007	ŁKS Łódź	0	(0)
2008	Stal Głowno	5	(0)
2009	Narew Ostrołęka	14	(0)
2010	Victoria Sulejówek		
2010–2011	Tęcza 34 Płońsk		
2012–2015	Victoria Sulejówek		
2015–2016	Drukarz Warsaw		
- * Club domestic league appearances and goals

Sebastian Iwanicki (born 3 September 1985) is a Polish former professional footballer who played as a midfielder. He is a trainee of Agrykola Warsaw. His father Krzysztof and uncle Leszek were also footballers.
