= Trześcianka =

- Village
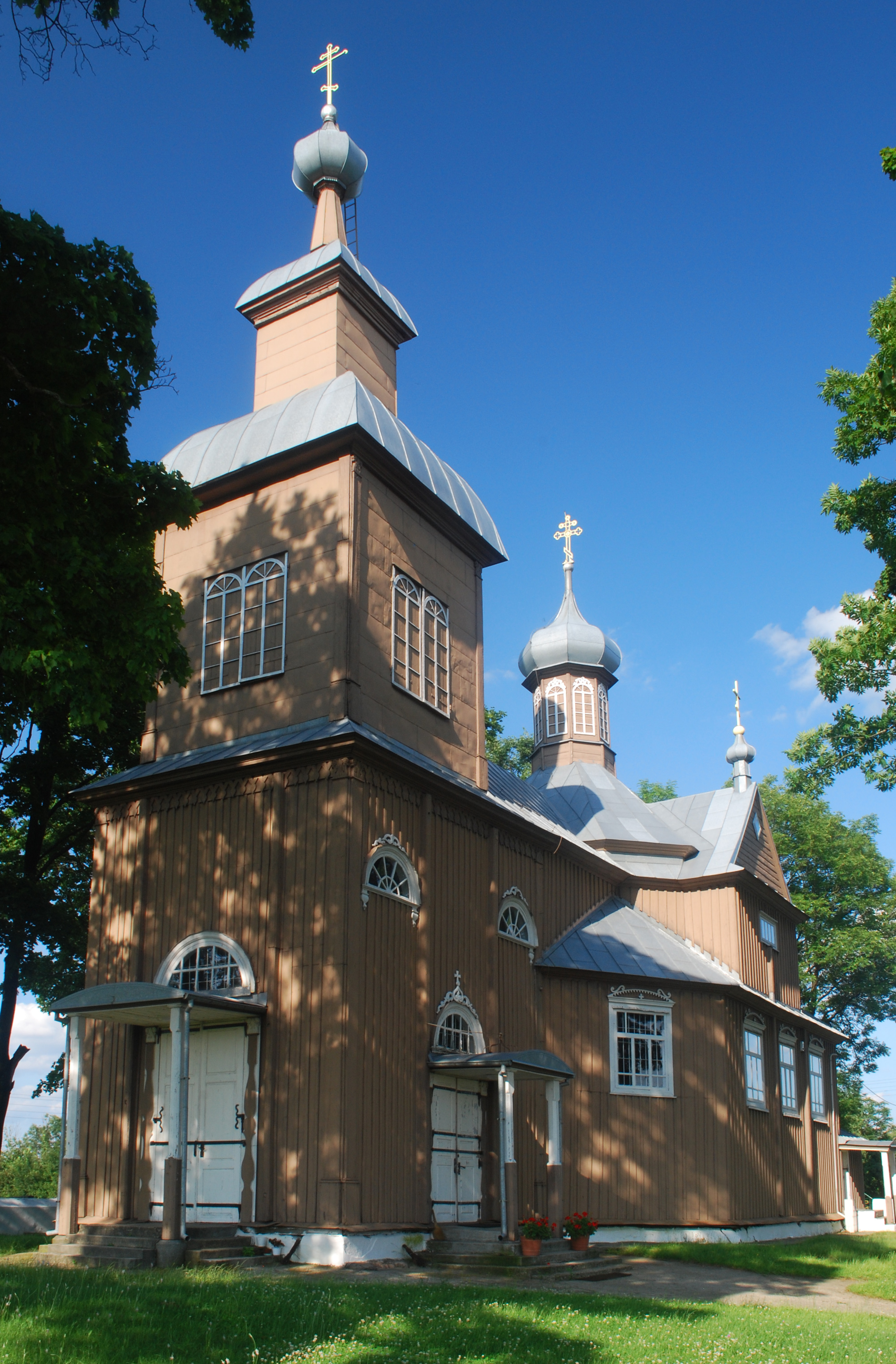
- Orthodox church of St. Michael the Archangel in Trześciana (1867)

- Location within Poland
- Coordinates: 52°56′N 23°27′E
- Country: Poland
- Voivodeship: Podlaskie
- County: Hajnówka
- Gmina: Narew

Trześcianka [tʂɛɕˈt͡ɕaŋka] is a village in the administrative district of Gmina Narew, within Hajnówka County, Podlaskie Voivodeship, in north-eastern Poland.

Trześcianka is mostly inhabited by Orthodox Belarusians who use Podlachian language.
