= Nowinnik =

- Village
- Location within Poland
- Coordinates: 52°52′9″N 23°30′21″E
- Country: Poland
- Voivodeship: Podlaskie
- County: Hajnówka
- Gmina: Narew

Nowinnik [nɔˈvinnik] is a village in the administrative district of Gmina Narew, within Hajnówka County, Podlaskie Voivodeship, in north-eastern Poland.
