= Rybaki, Hajnówka County =

Rybaki
- Village
- Location within Poland
- Coordinates: 52°55′N 23°36′E
- Country: Poland
- Voivodeship: Podlaskie
- County: Hajnówka
- Gmina: Narew

Rybaki [rɨˈbaki] is a village in the administrative district of Gmina Narew, within Hajnówka County, Podlaskie Voivodeship, in north-eastern Poland.
