= Gorodzisko =

- Village
- Location within Poland
- Coordinates: 52°54′15″N 23°28′45″E
- Country: Poland
- Voivodeship: Podlaskie
- County: Hajnówka
- Gmina: Narew
- Population: 100

Gorodzisko [ɡɔrɔˈd͡ʑiskɔ] is a village in the administrative district of Gmina Narew, within Hajnówka County, Podlaskie Voivodeship, in north-eastern Poland.
