= Janowo, Gmina Narew =

Janowo
- Village
- Location within Poland
- Coordinates: 52°56′02″N 23°31′09″E
- Country: Poland
- Voivodeship: Podlaskie
- County: Hajnówka
- Gmina: Narew
- Population (approx.): 40

Janowo [jaˈnɔvɔ] is a village in the administrative district of Gmina Narew, within Hajnówka County, Podlaskie Voivodeship, in north-eastern Poland.
