= Gradoczno =

- Village
- Location within Poland
- Coordinates: 52°54′35″N 23°28′25″E
- Country: Poland
- Voivodeship: Podlaskie
- County: Hajnówka
- Gmina: Narew
- Population: 70

Gradoczno [ɡraˈdɔt͡ʂnɔ] is a village in the administrative district of Gmina Narew, within Hajnówka County, Podlaskie Voivodeship, in north-eastern Poland.
