= Istok, Gmina Narew =

Istok
- Village
- Location within Poland
- Coordinates: 52°50′52″N 23°26′23″E
- Country: Poland
- Voivodeship: Podlaskie
- County: Hajnówka
- Gmina: Narew
- Population: 70

Istok [ˈistɔk] is a village in the administrative district of Gmina Narew, within Hajnówka County, Podlaskie Voivodeship, in north-eastern Poland.
