= Tokarowszczyzna, Hajnówka County =

Tokarowszczyzna
- Settlement
- Location within Poland
- Coordinates: 52°57′46″N 23°34′53″E
- Country: Poland
- Voivodeship: Podlaskie
- County: Hajnówka
- Gmina: Narew

Tokarowszczyzna [tɔkarɔfʂˈt͡ʂɨzna] is a settlement in the administrative district of Gmina Narew, within Hajnówka County, Podlaskie Voivodeship, in north-eastern Poland.
