= Łapuchówka =

- Village
- Location within Poland
- Coordinates: 52°51′38″N 23°29′43″E
- Country: Poland
- Voivodeship: Podlaskie
- County: Hajnówka
- Gmina: Narew

Łapuchówka [wapuˈxufka] is a village in the administrative district of Gmina Narew, within Hajnówka County, Podlaskie Voivodeship, in north-eastern Poland.
