= Krzywiec, Podlaskie Voivodeship =

Krzywiec
- Village
- Location within Poland
- Coordinates: 52°53′N 23°35′E
- Country: Poland
- Voivodeship: Podlaskie
- County: Hajnówka
- Gmina: Narew

Krzywiec [ˈkʂɨvʲɛt͡s] is a village in the administrative district of Gmina Narew, within Hajnówka County, Podlaskie Voivodeship, in north-eastern Poland.
