= Puchły =

- Village
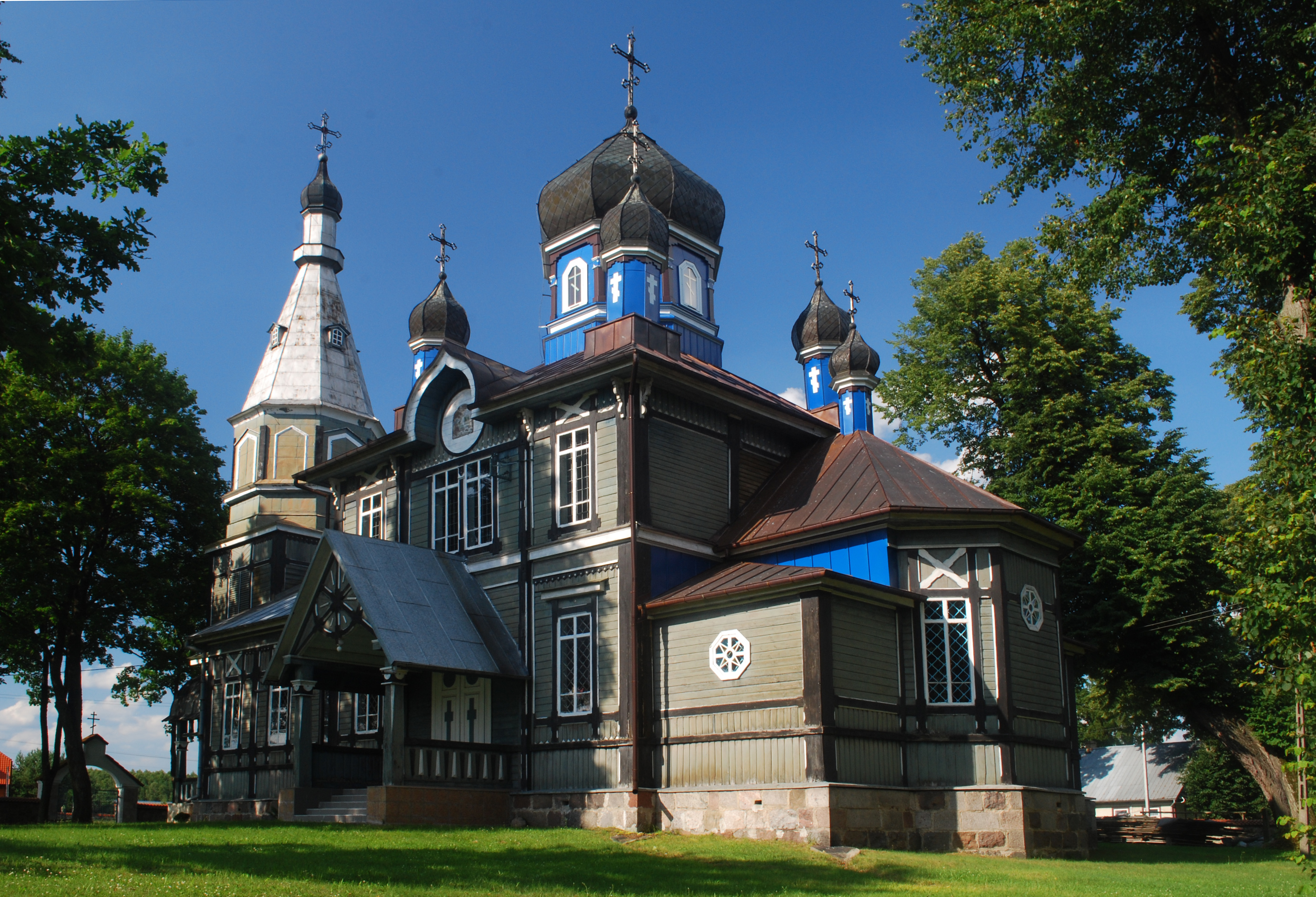
- Orthodox church of the Protection of the Holy Virgin in Puchły

- Location within Poland
- Coordinates: 52°55′N 23°24′E
- Country: Poland
- Voivodeship: Podlaskie
- County: Hajnówka
- Gmina: Narew

Puchły [ˈpuxwɨ] is a village in the administrative district of Gmina Narew, within Hajnówka County, Podlaskie Voivodeship, in north-eastern Poland.
