= Cimochy, Podlaskie Voivodeship =

Cimochy
- Village
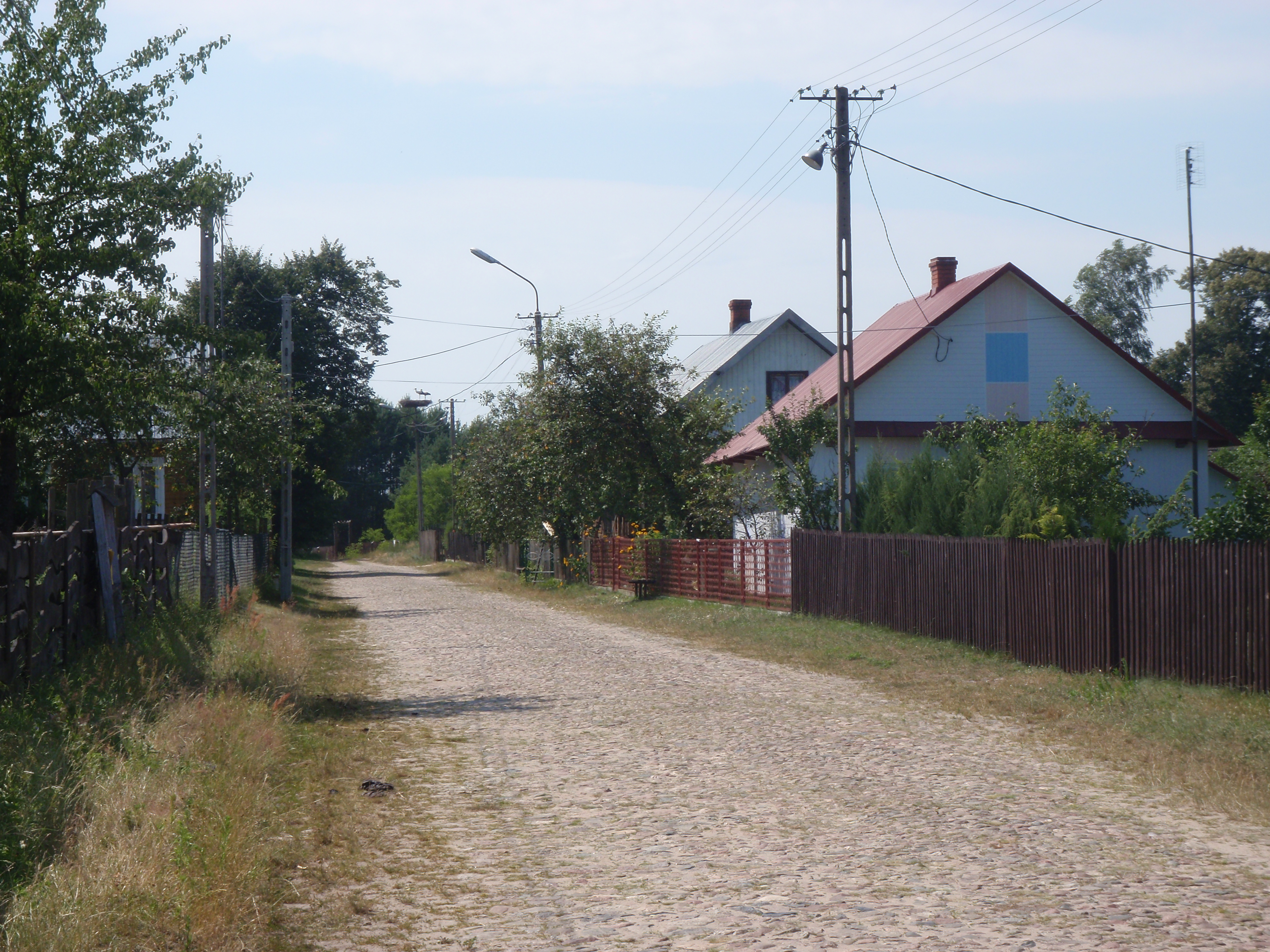

- Location within Poland
- Coordinates: 52°55′20″N 23°34′55″E
- Country: Poland
- Voivodeship: Podlaskie
- County: Hajnówka
- Gmina: Narew
- Population: 50

Cimochy [t͡ɕiˈmɔxɨ] is a village in the administrative district of Gmina Narew, within Hajnówka County, Podlaskie Voivodeship, in north-eastern Poland.
