= Hajdukowszczyzna =

- Village
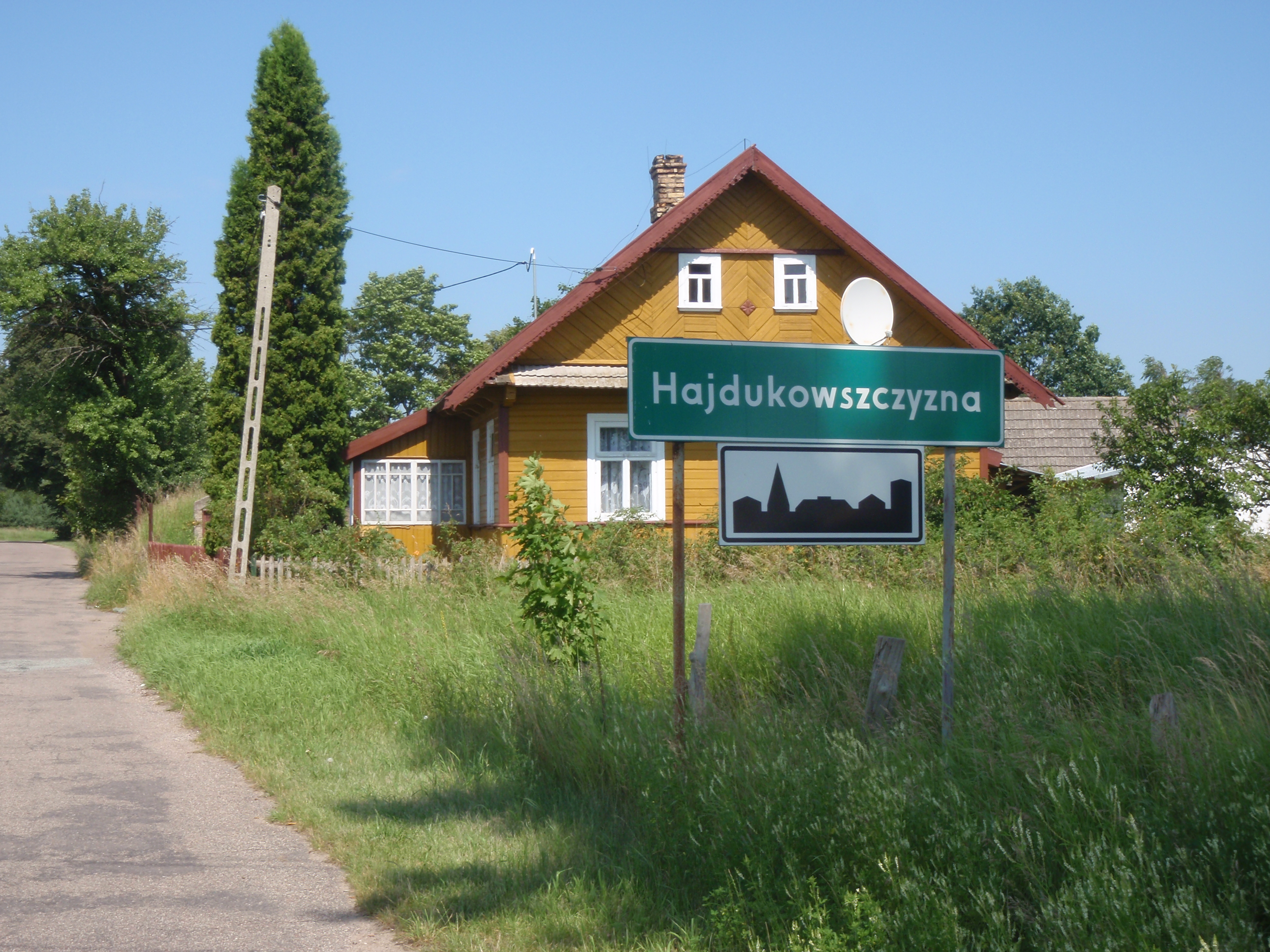
- Road limit sign in Hajdukowszczyzna

- Location within Poland
- Coordinates: 52°54′32″N 23°34′25″E
- Country: Poland
- Voivodeship: Podlaskie
- County: Hajnówka
- Gmina: Narew

Hajdukowszczyzna [xai̯dukɔfʂˈt͡ʂɨzna] is a village in the administrative district of Gmina Narew, within Hajnówka County, Podlaskie Voivodeship, in north-eastern Poland.
