= Cisy, Podlaskie Voivodeship =

Cisy
- Village
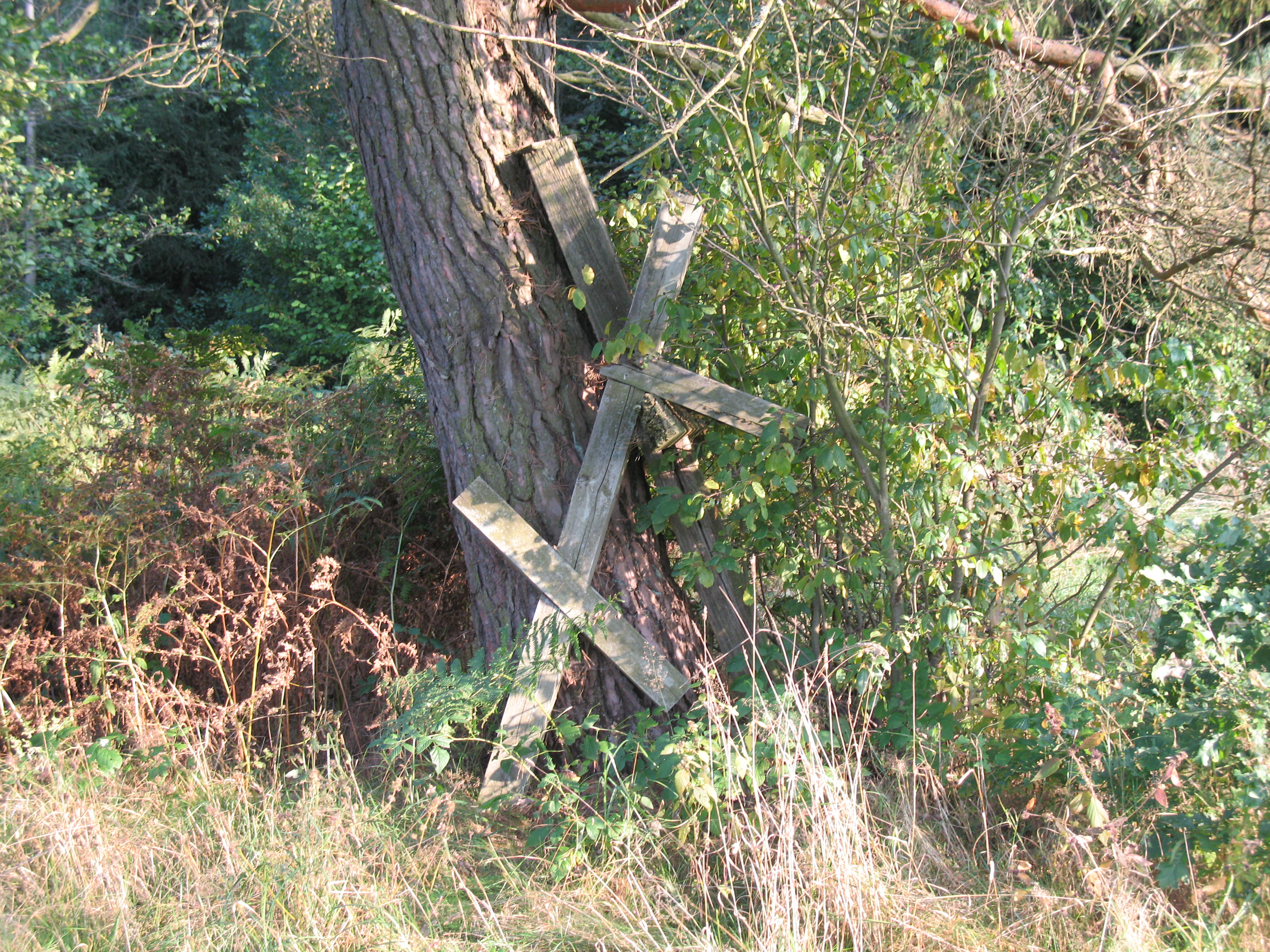
- Age-old votive crosses in the semi-deserted village of Cisy

- Location within Poland
- Coordinates: 52°57′54″N 23°33′56″E
- Country: Poland
- Voivodeship: Podlaskie
- County: Hajnówka
- Gmina: Narew
- Population: 20

Cisy [ˈt͡ɕisɨ] is a village in the administrative district of Gmina Narew, within Hajnówka County, Podlaskie Voivodeship, in north-eastern Poland.
