= Ancuty =

- Village
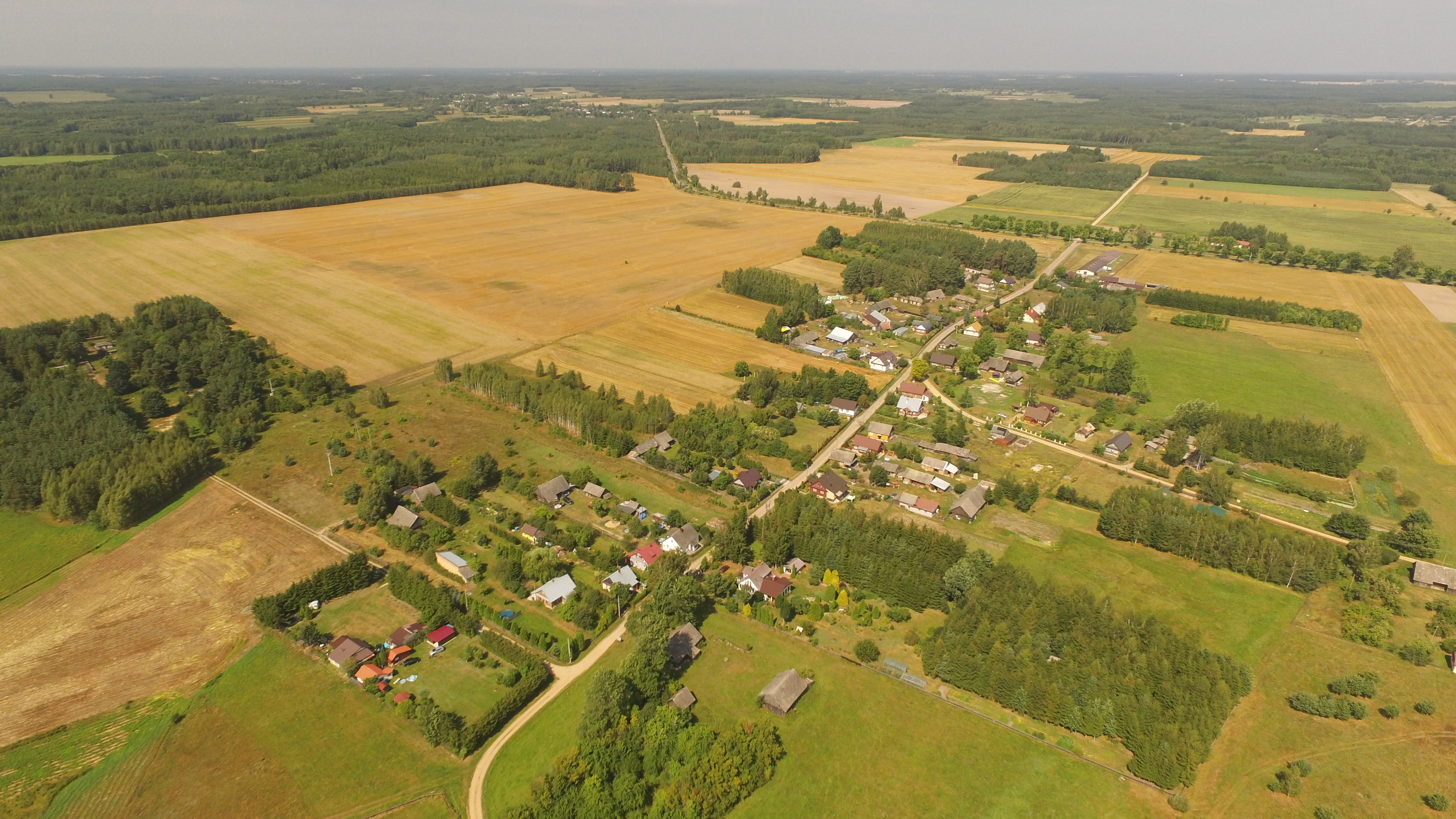

- Location within Poland
- Coordinates: 52°56′N 23°29′E
- Country: Poland
- Voivodeship: Podlaskie
- County: Hajnówka
- Gmina: Narew
- Population: 80

Ancuty [anˈt͡sutɨ] is a village in the administrative district of Gmina Narew, within Hajnówka County, Podlaskie Voivodeship, in north-eastern Poland.
