= Boris Mahon de Monaghan =

French footballer (born 1986)

Boris Mahon
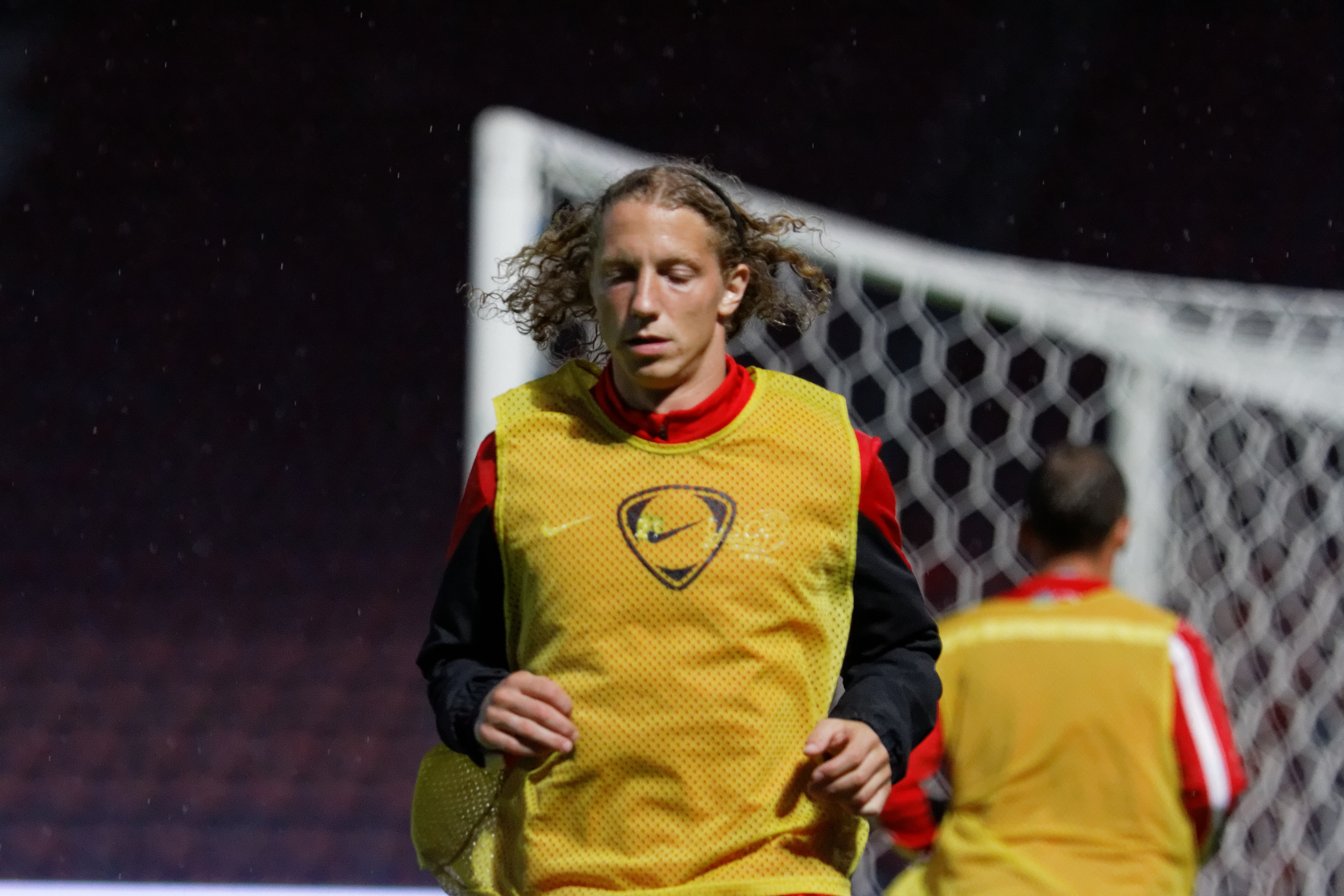
- Boris Mahon de Monaghan

Personal information
- Full name: Boris Mahon de Monaghan
- Date of birth: 11 February 1986 (age 40)
- Place of birth: Orléans, France
- Height: 1.76 m (5 ft 9 in)
- Position: Defender

Team information
- Current team: Albères Argelès

Senior career*
| Years | Team | Apps | (Gls) |
| 2004–2006 | Sedan | 1 | (0) |
| 2006–2009 | Orléans | | |
| 2009–2016 | Créteil | 215 | (8) |
| 2016–2017 | Gazélec Ajaccio | 20 | (0) |
| 2017–2018 | Créteil | 13 | (0) |
| 2018–2021 | Canet Roussillon | 39 | (0) |
| 2021– | Albères Argelès | 69 | (1) |
- * Club domestic league appearances and goals as of 23:53, 11 May 2022 (UTC)

Boris Mahon de Monaghan (born 11 February 1986) is a French professional footballer who plays for Championnat National 3 club Albères Argelès.

== Career ==
Mahon de Monaghan has played at the professional level in Ligue 2 for Sedan, Créteil, and Gazélec Ajaccio. He is the record appearance holder for Créteil. He was briefly overtaken for most appearances by teammate Vincent Di Bartoloméo.
