= Bruszkowszczyzna =

- Village
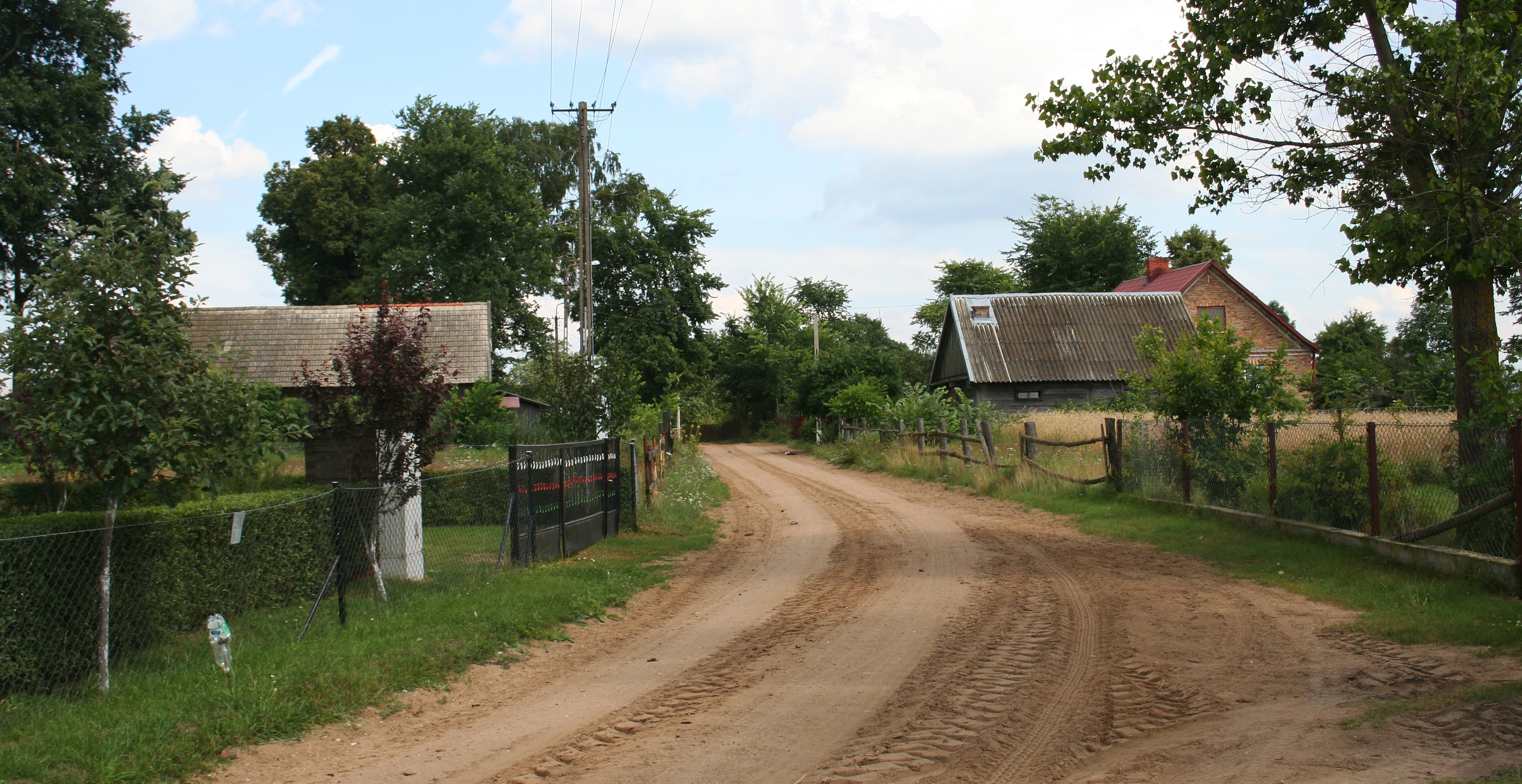

- Location within Poland
- Coordinates: 52°56′N 23°35′E
- Country: Poland
- Voivodeship: Podlaskie
- County: Hajnówka
- Gmina: Narew

Bruszkowszczyzna [bruʂkɔfʂˈt͡ʂɨzna] is a village in the administrative district of Gmina Narew, within Hajnówka County, Podlaskie Voivodeship, in north-eastern Poland.
