= Saki, Gmina Narew =

Saki
- Village
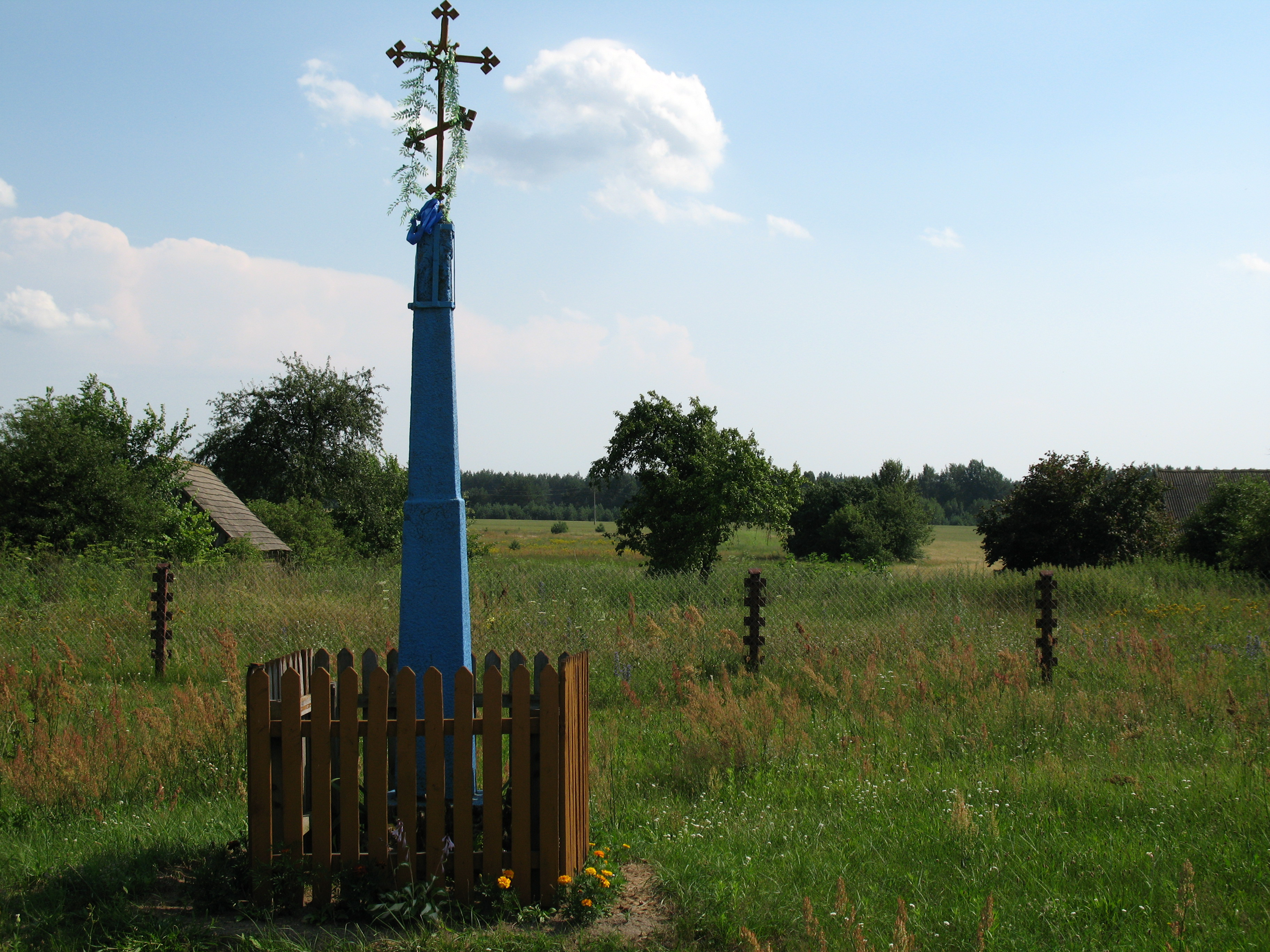
- Orthodox cross in Saki

- Location within Poland
- Coordinates: 52°57′02″N 23°29′35″E
- Country: Poland
- Voivodeship: Podlaskie
- County: Hajnówka
- Gmina: Narew

Saki (Polish pronunciation: [ˈsakʲi]) is a village in the administrative district of Gmina Narew, within Hajnówka County, Podlaskie Voivodeship, in north-eastern Poland.
