= Soce, Poland =

Soce
- Village
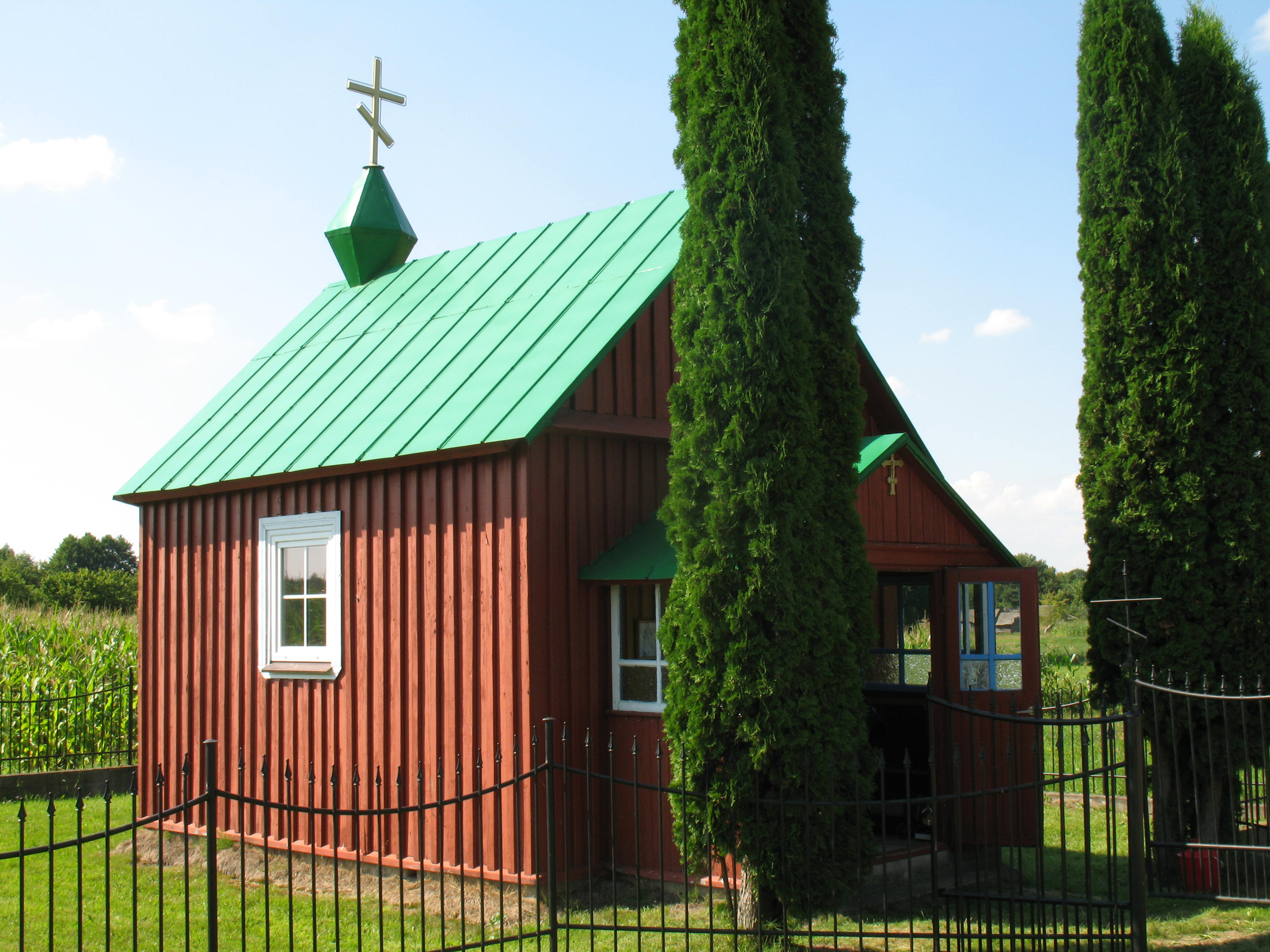
- Orthodox chapel of Elijah the Prophet in Soce

- Location within Poland
- Coordinates: 52°57′N 23°24′E
- Country: Poland
- Voivodeship: Podlaskie
- County: Hajnówka
- Gmina: Narew

Soce [ˈsɔt͡sɛ] is a village in the administrative district of Gmina Narew, within Hajnówka County, Podlaskie Voivodeship, in north-eastern Poland.

The village is inhabited mostly by Orthodox Belarusians who use Podlachian language.

An ethnographic-tourist project called "The Land of Open Shutters" is realized in Soce. The main objective of this project is to preserve an original wooden architecture of cabin-like old cottages with intricately carved ornaments like vibrant and colourful shutters or dynamically designed edge guards.

Despite the recently increased modernisation, the traditional architecture is still in evidence.

== The Land of Open Shutters in Soce ==
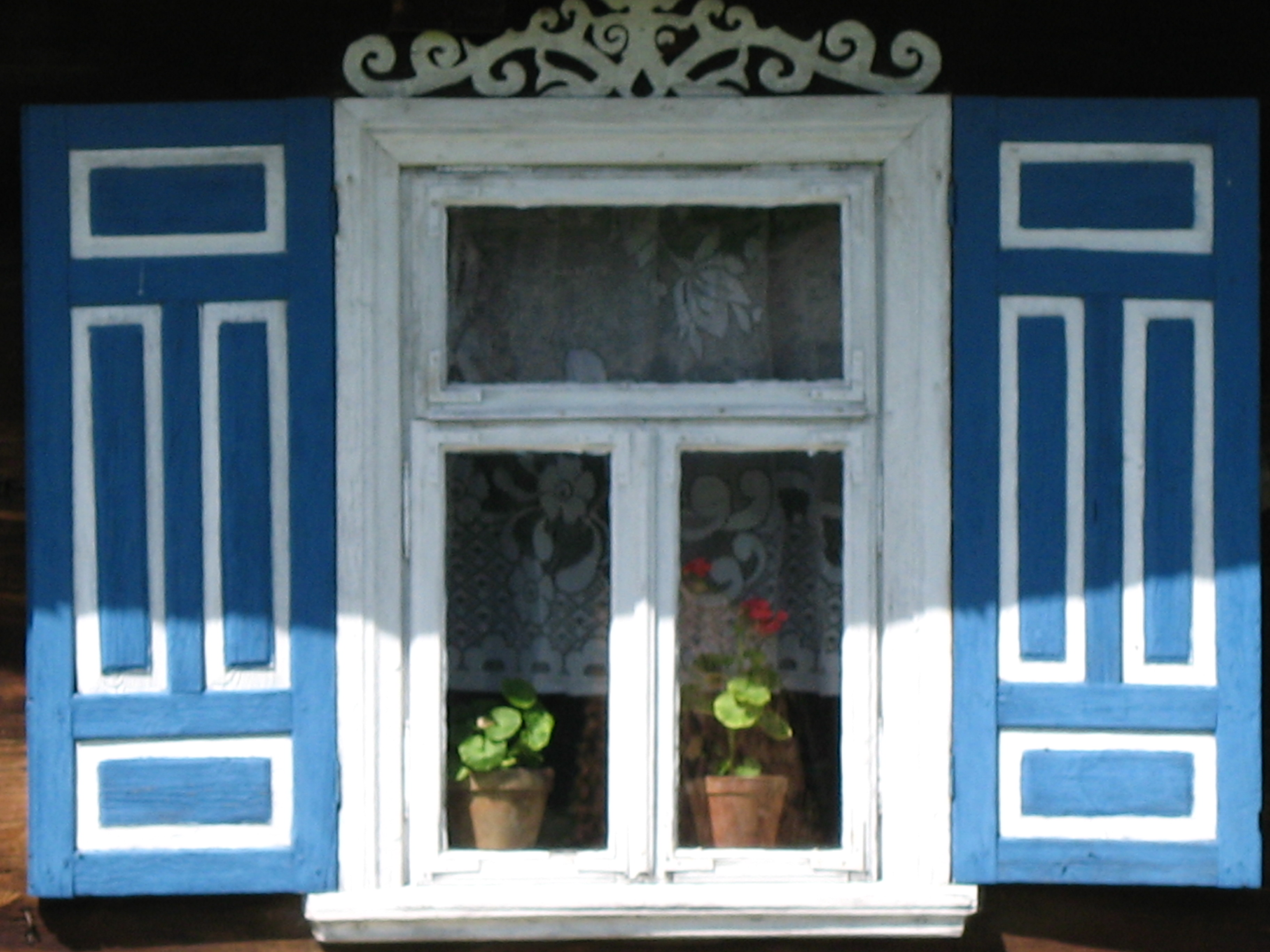

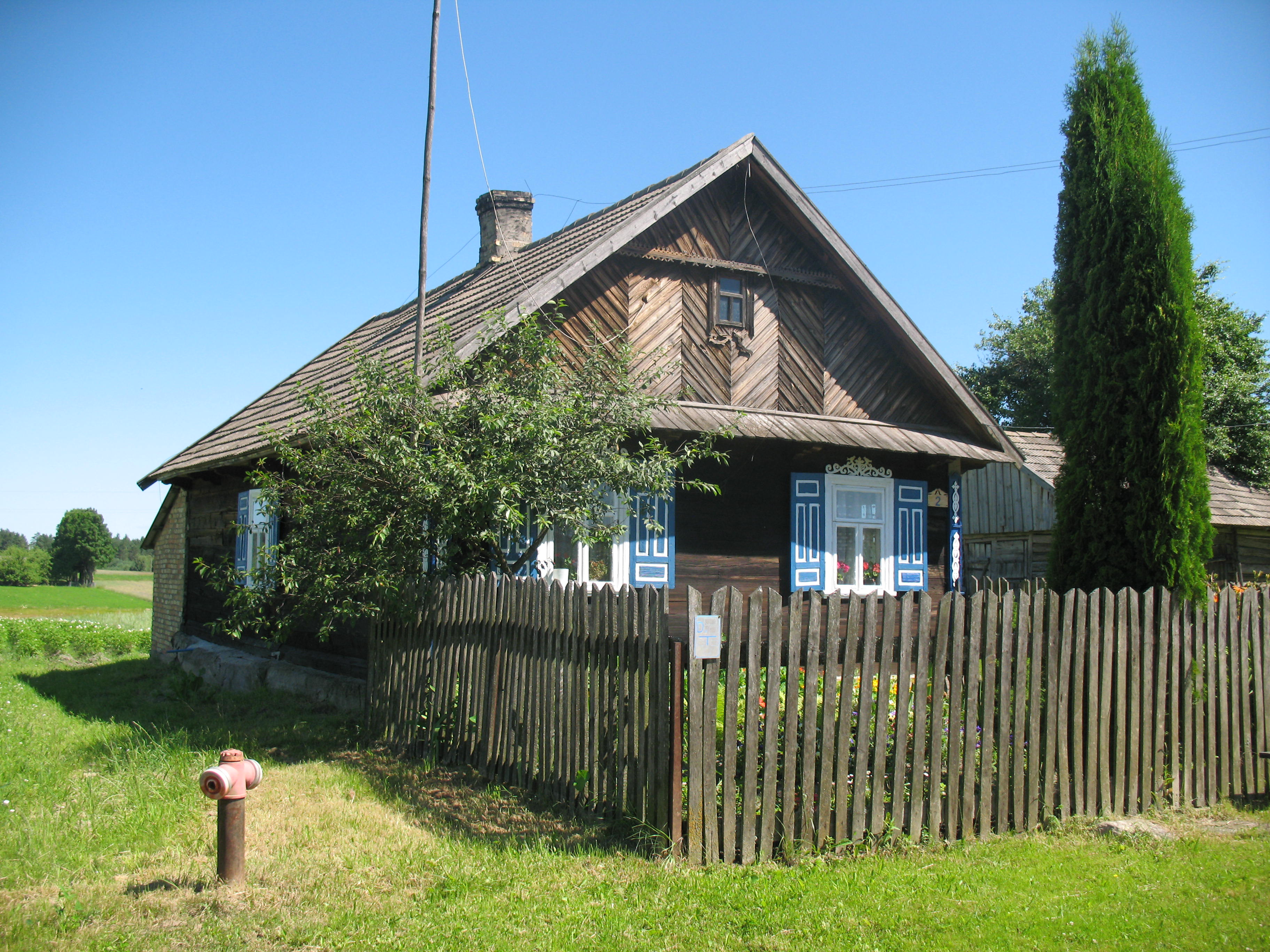

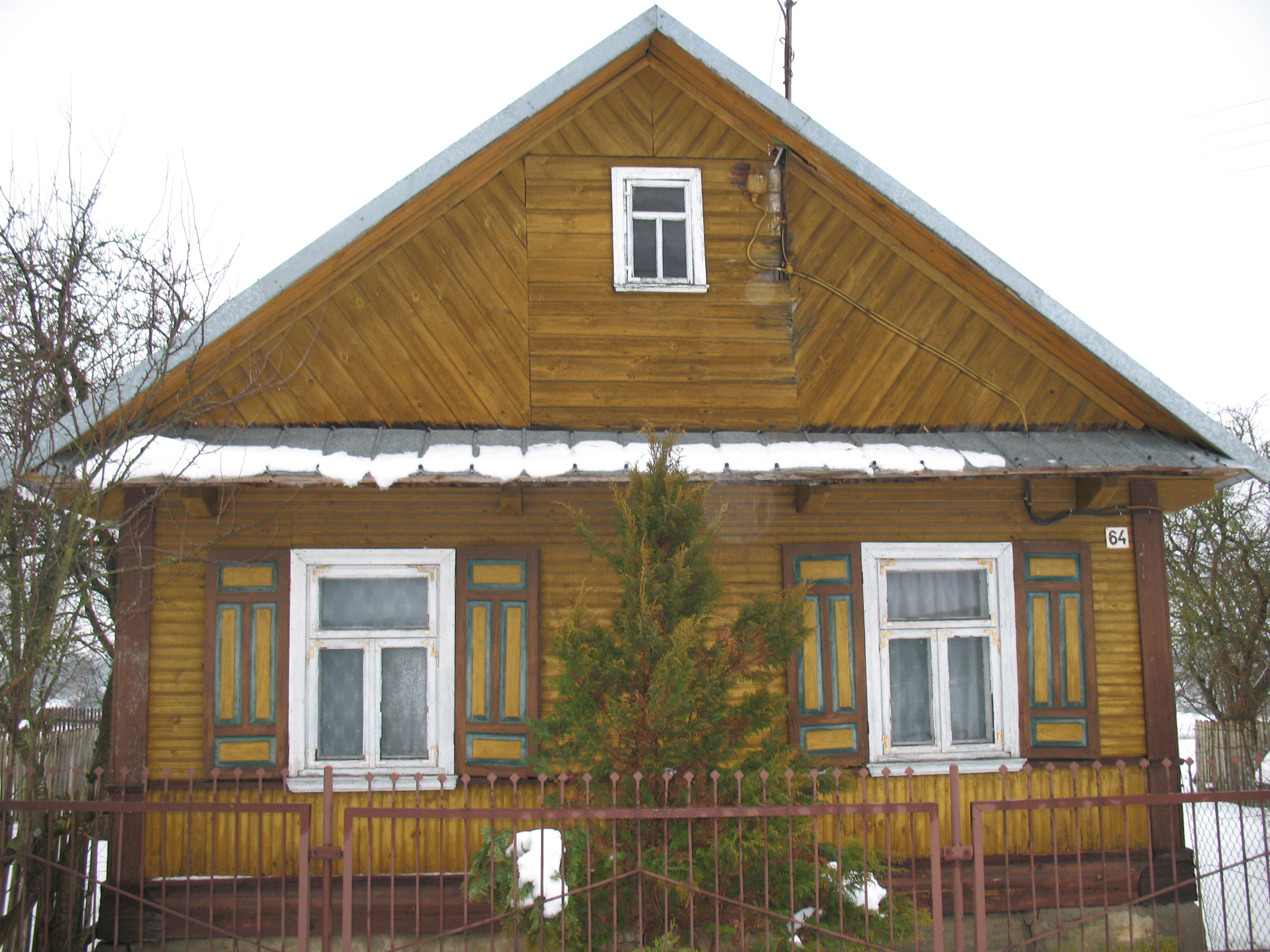

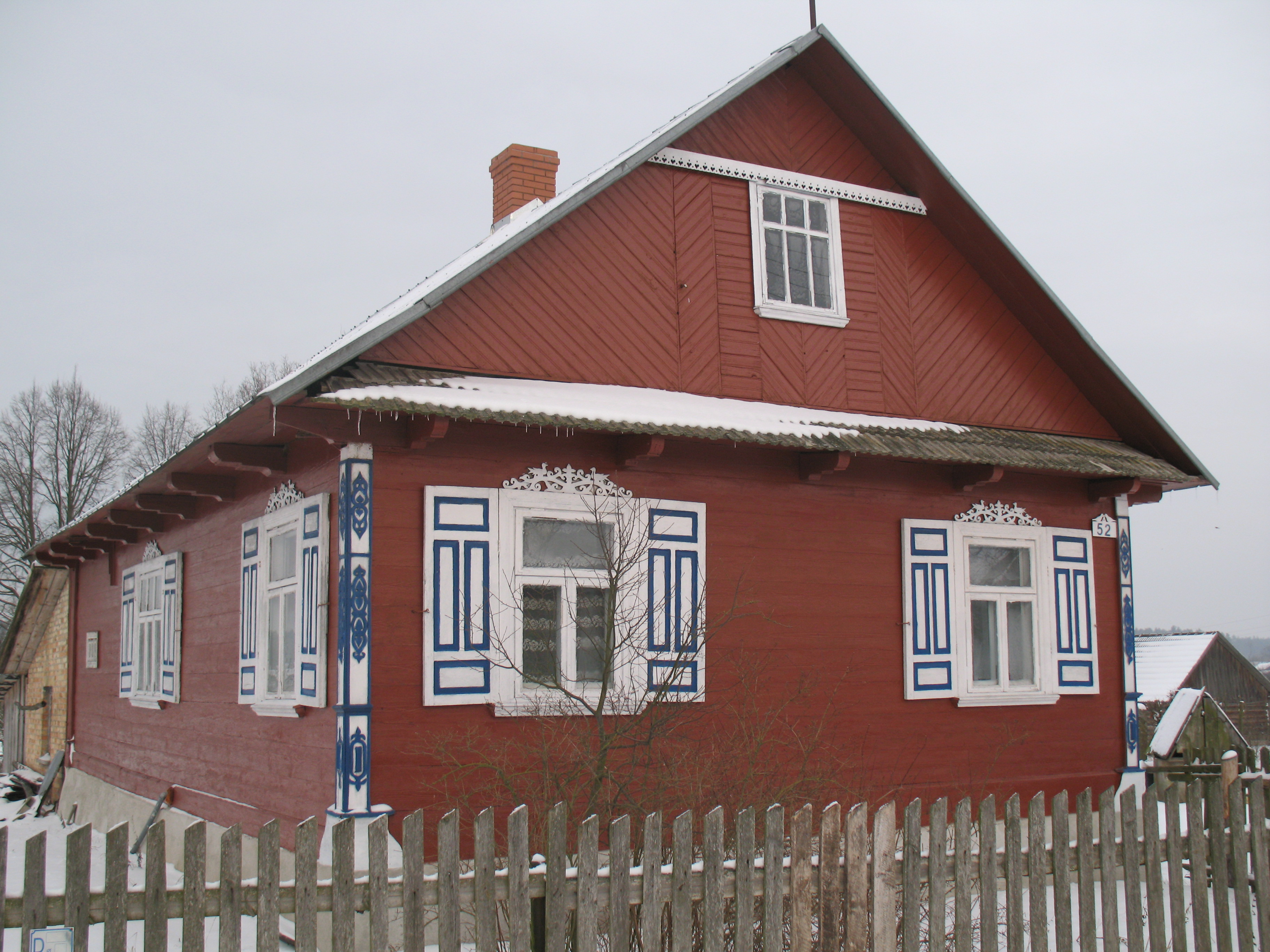

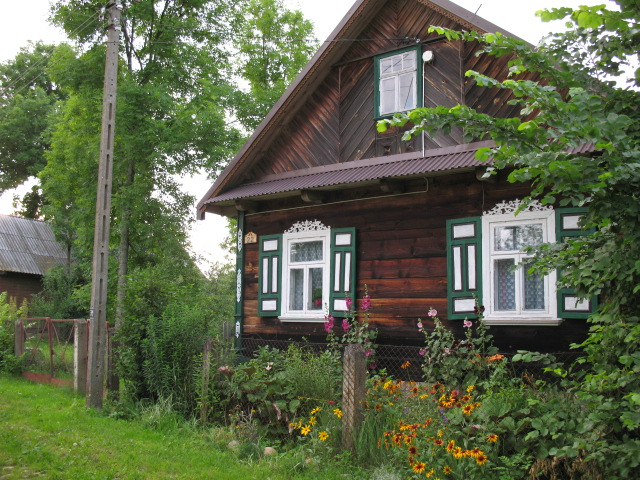

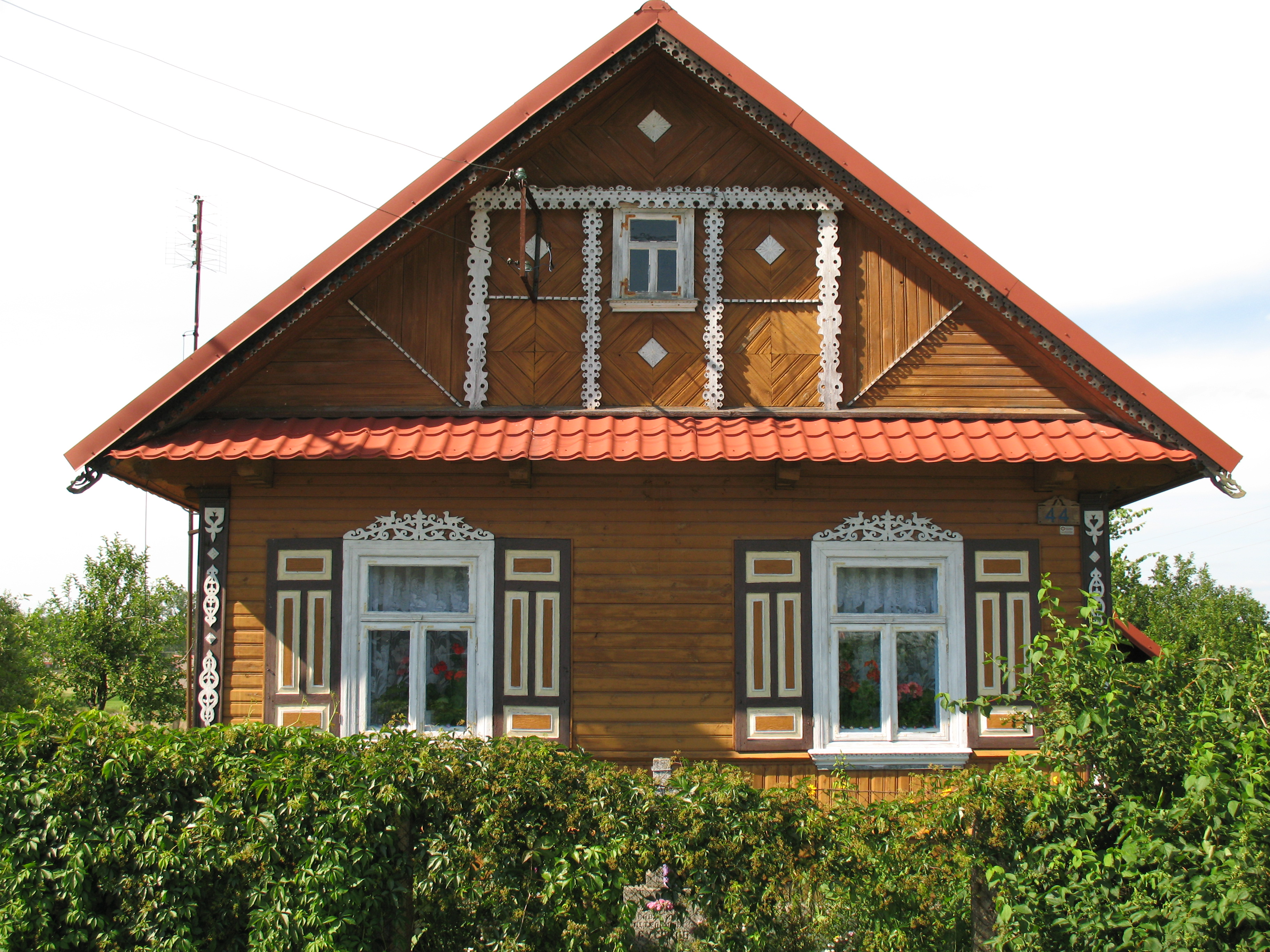

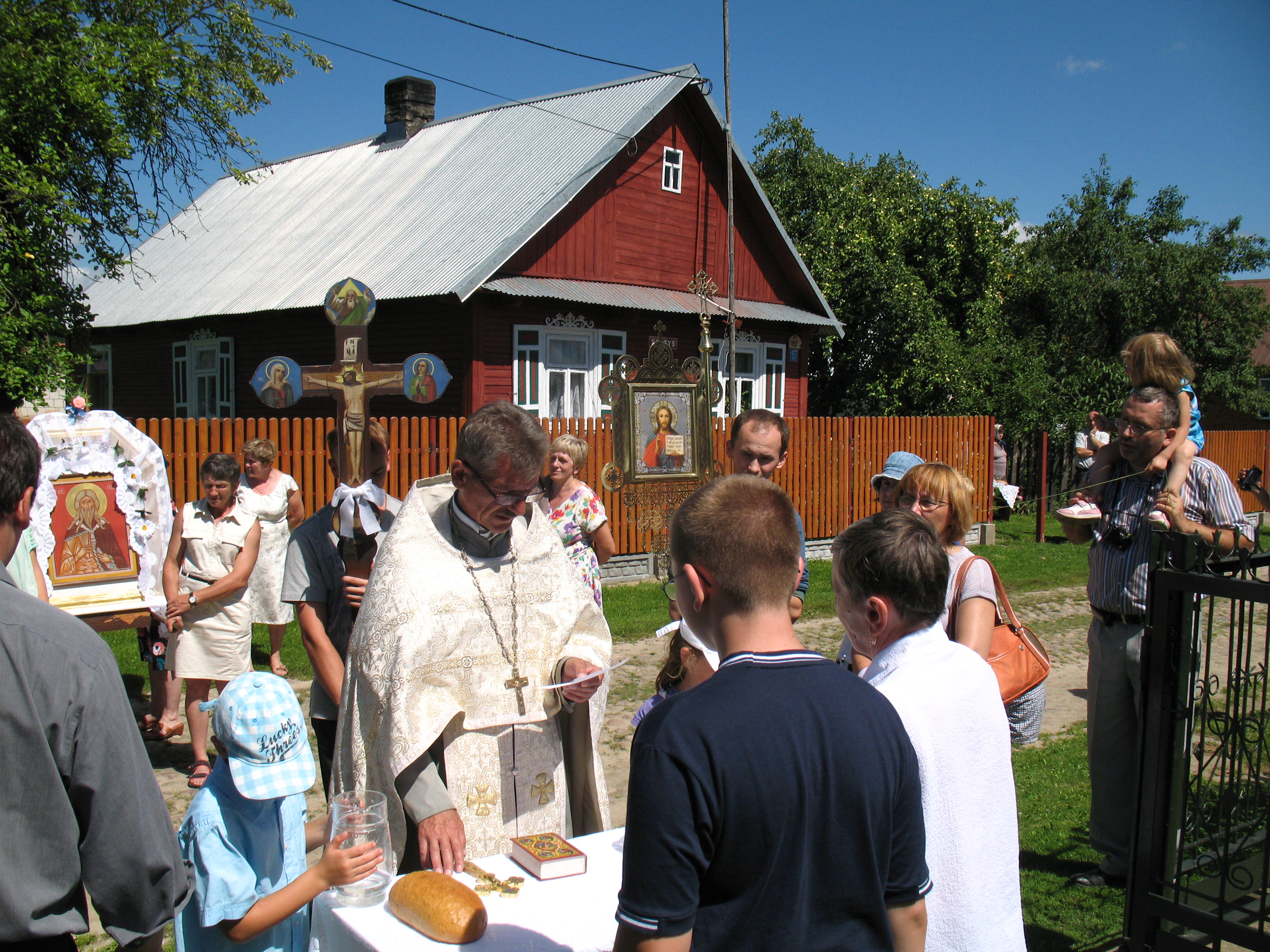

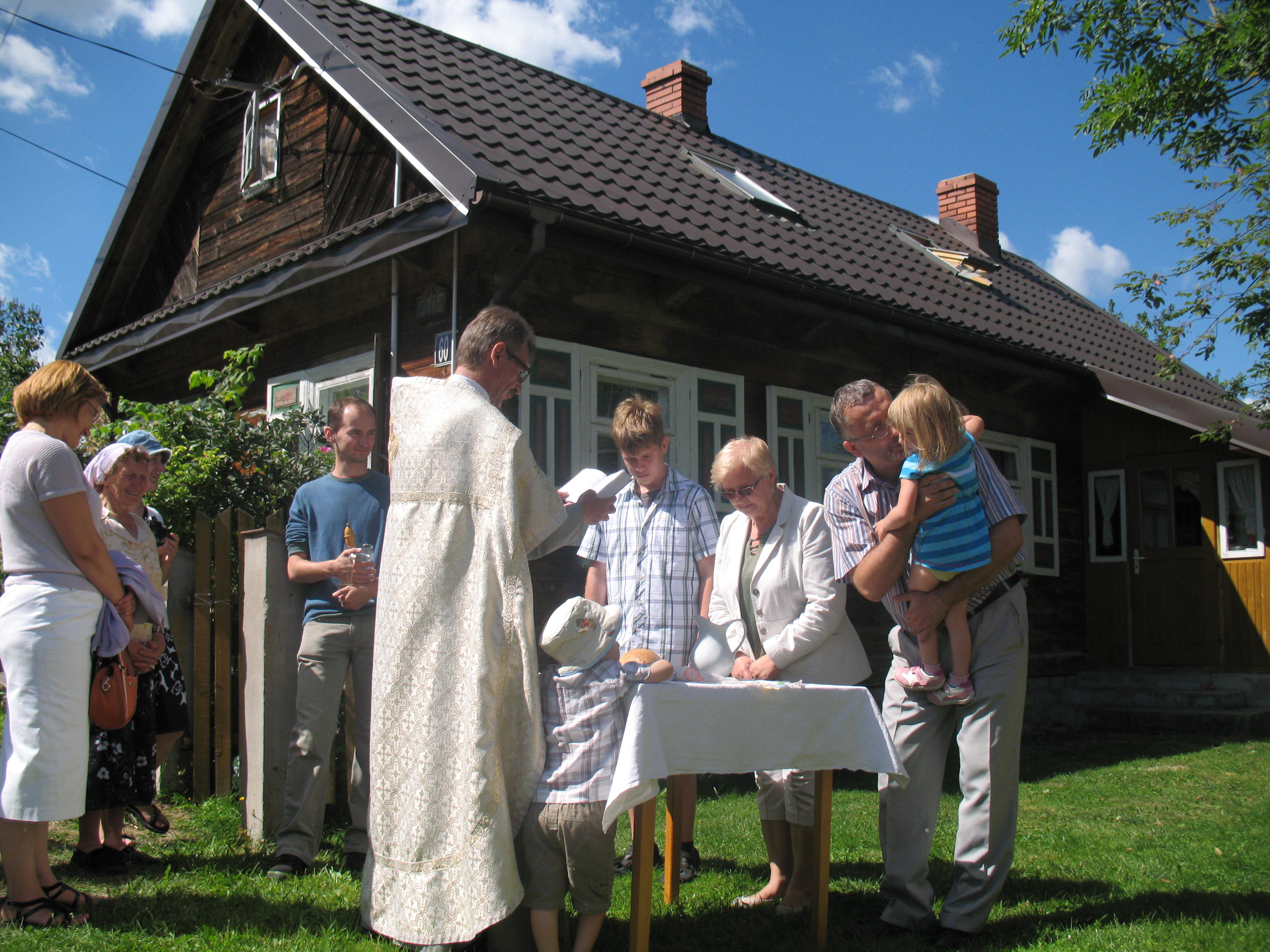

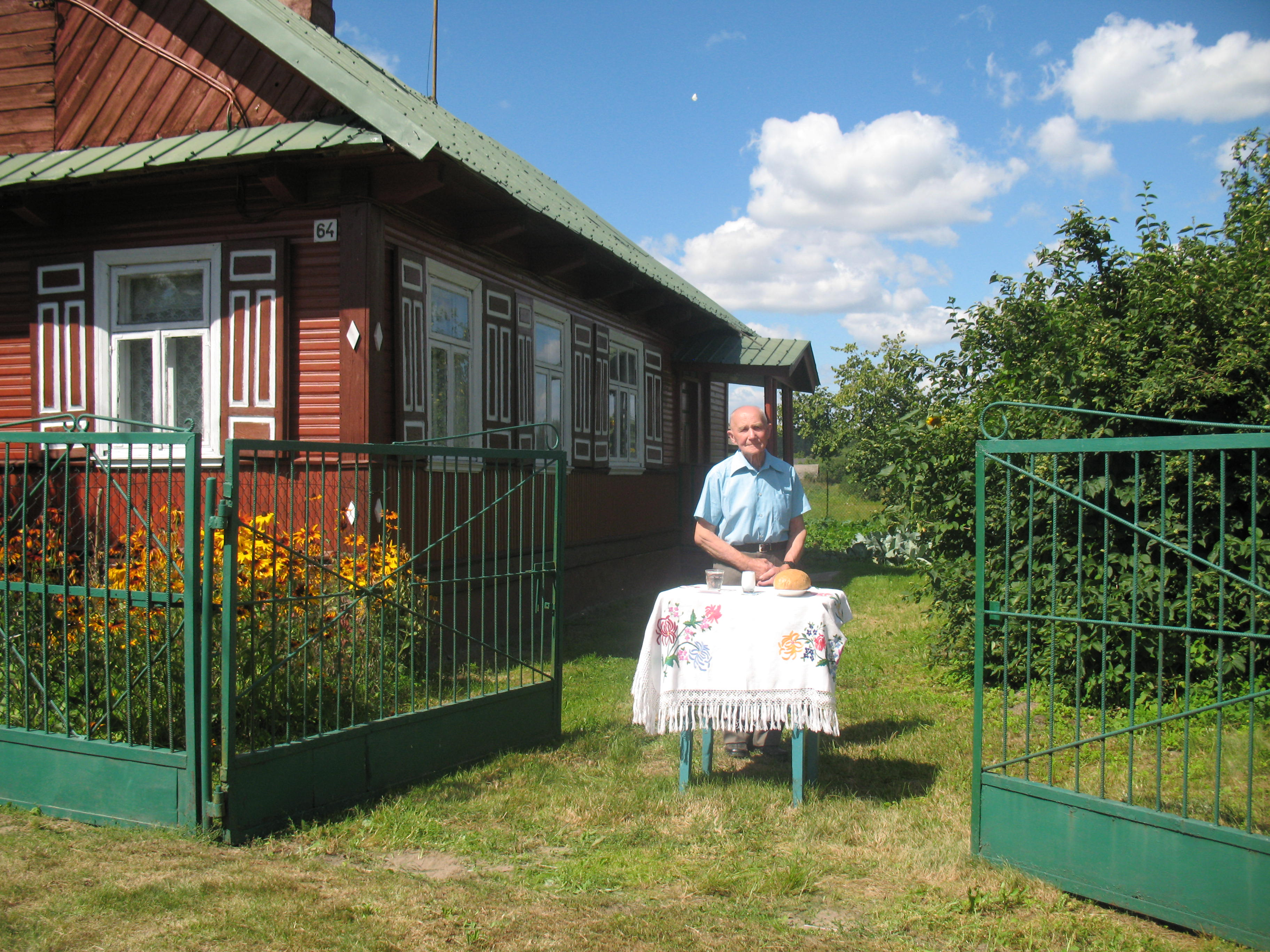
