= Koweła =

- Village
- Location within Poland
- Coordinates: 52°50′N 23°33′E
- Country: Poland
- Voivodeship: Podlaskie
- County: Hajnówka
- Gmina: Narew
- Population: 130

Koweła [kɔˈvɛwa] is a village in the administrative district of Gmina Narew, within Hajnówka County, Podlaskie Voivodeship, in north-eastern Poland.
