= Paszkowszczyzna, Hajnówka County =

Paszkowszczyzna
- Village
- Location within Poland
- Coordinates: 52°57′09″N 23°31′50″E
- Country: Poland
- Voivodeship: Podlaskie
- County: Hajnówka
- Gmina: Narew

Paszkowszczyzna [paʂkɔfʂˈt͡ʂɨzna] is a village in the administrative district of Gmina Narew, within Hajnówka County, Podlaskie Voivodeship, in northeastern Poland.
