= Tyniewicze Małe =

- Village
- Location within Poland
- Coordinates: 52°51′N 23°28′E
- Country: Poland
- Voivodeship: Podlaskie
- County: Hajnówka
- Gmina: Narew
- Area: 2.350 km^{2} (0.907 sq mi)
- Population: 52 (2,011)
  - Density: 22.13/km^{2} (57.3/sq mi)

Tyniewicze Małe [tɨɲɛˈvit͡ʂɛ ˈmawɛ] is a village in the administrative district of Gmina Narew, within Hajnówka County, Podlaskie Voivodeship, in north-eastern Poland.
