= Gorędy =

- Village
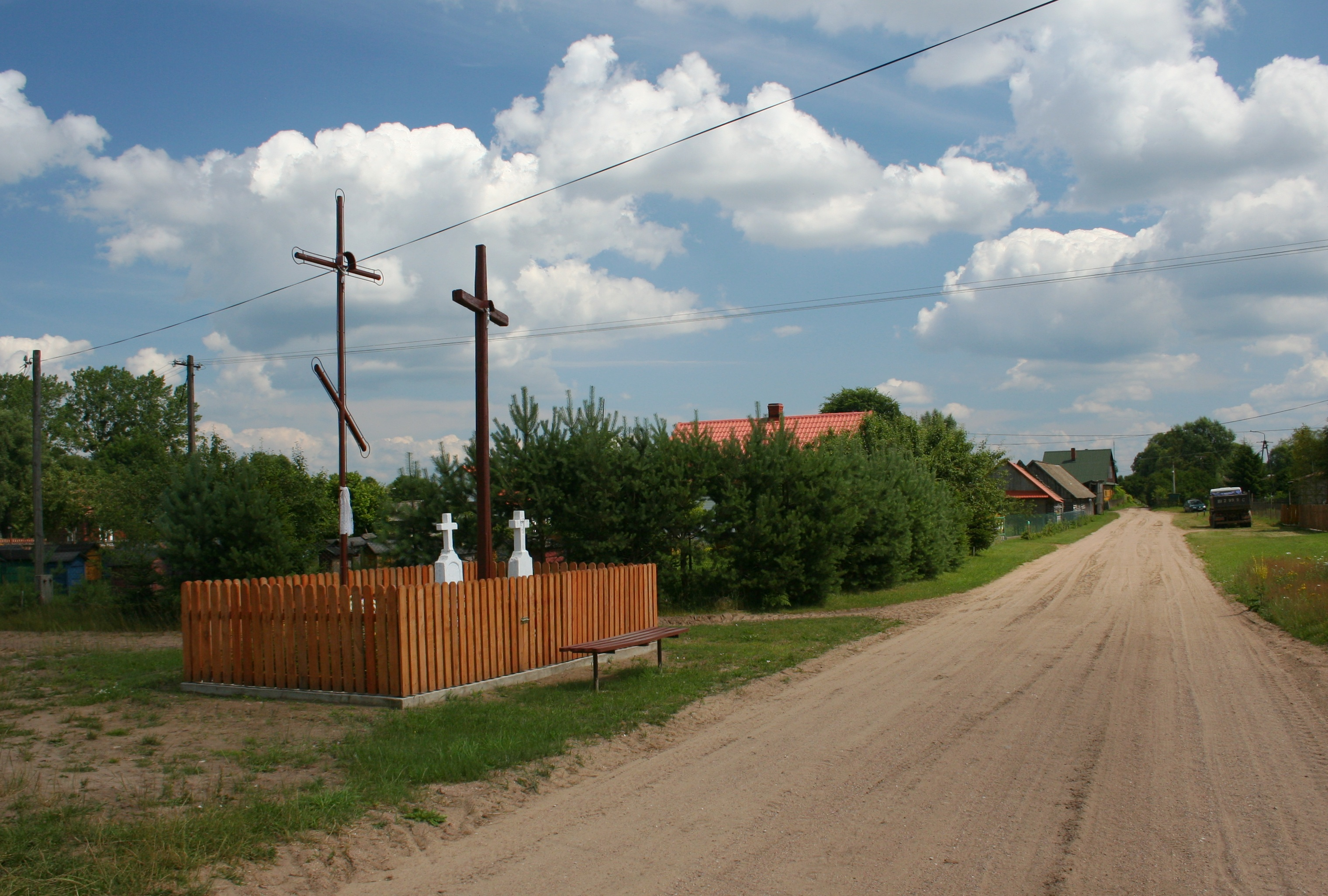
- Orthodox crosses in Gorędy

- Location within Poland
- Coordinates: 52°54′30″N 23°28′30″E
- Country: Poland
- Voivodeship: Podlaskie
- County: Hajnówka
- Gmina: Narew
- Population: 50

Gorędy [ɡɔˈrɛndɨ] is a village in the administrative district of Gmina Narew, within Hajnówka County, Podlaskie Voivodeship, in north-eastern Poland.
