= Ogrodniki, Hajnówka County =

Ogrodniki
- Village
- Location within Poland
- Coordinates: 52°57′49″N 23°31′10″E
- Country: Poland
- Voivodeship: Podlaskie
- County: Hajnówka
- Gmina: Narew

Ogrodniki [ɔɡrɔdˈɲikʲi] is a village in the administrative district of Gmina Narew, within Hajnówka County, Podlaskie Voivodeship, in north-eastern Poland.
