= Przybudki =

- Village
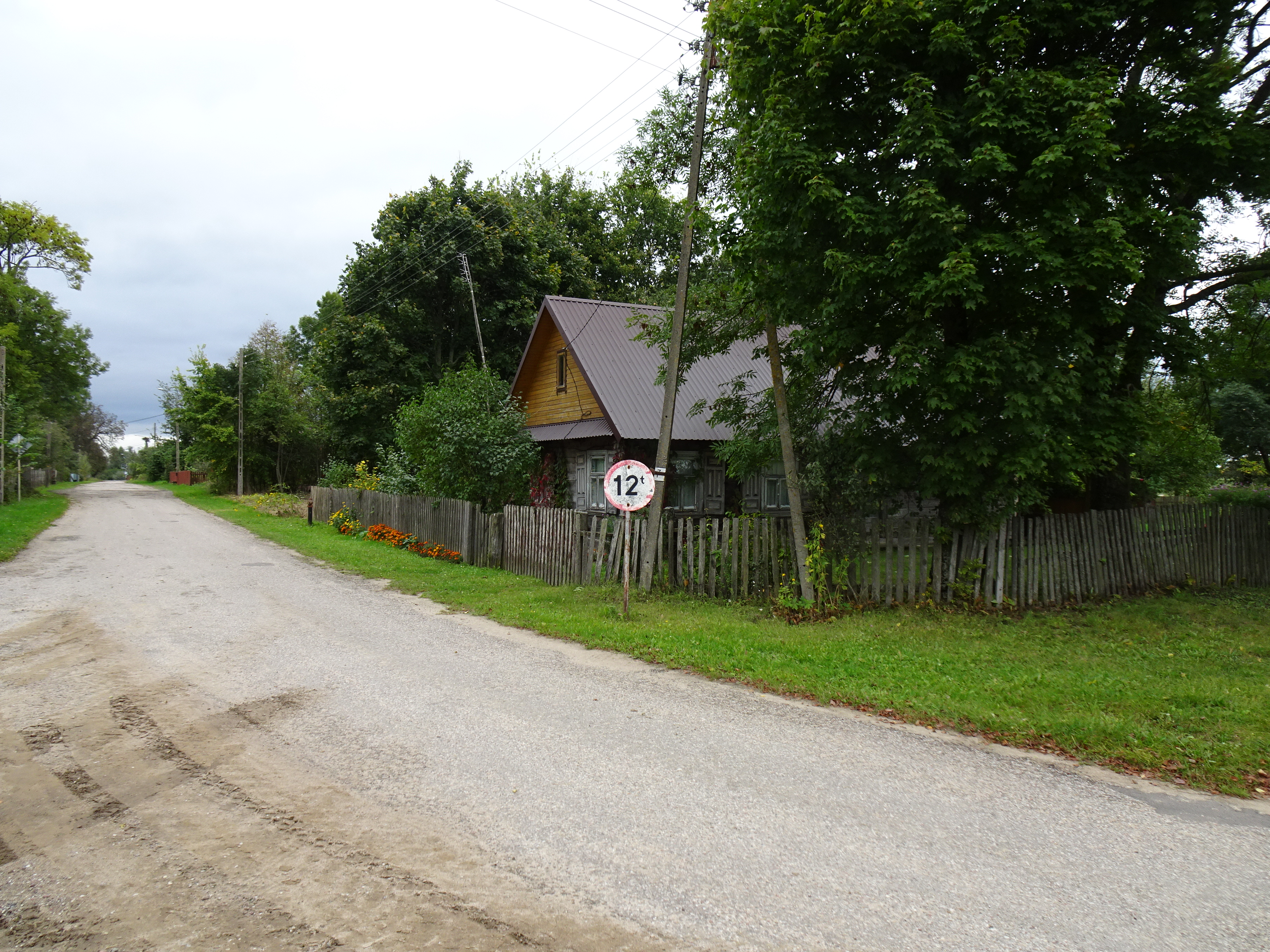

- Location within Poland
- Coordinates: 52°55′30″N 23°24′30″E
- Country: Poland
- Voivodeship: Podlaskie
- County: Hajnówka
- Gmina: Narew

Przybudki [pʂɨˈbutki] is a village in the administrative district of Gmina Narew, within Hajnówka County, Podlaskie Voivodeship, in north-eastern Poland.

== History ==
The village and the manor farm were established in the years 1775–1785. The name indicates the location next to the forest guard booth. At that time, there were numerous forest guard booths on the edge of the Bielska Forest, which protected the forests belonging to the royal estates. The old monumental Dunin Oak, which remained from the former Ladzka Forest, has been preserved near the village.

During World War II, the Germans settled some families from pacified villages here. In 1945, as a result of Soviet agitation, two farmers left for the Belarusian SSR. One of them left land with an area of 2.12 hectares, the other with an area of 6.7 hectares.

The Belarusian weekly Niwa wrote in 1981 that Przybudki is "a small village on the edge of the former Ladzka Forest. The land is sandy and marshy". In 1981, drainage of the fields began.

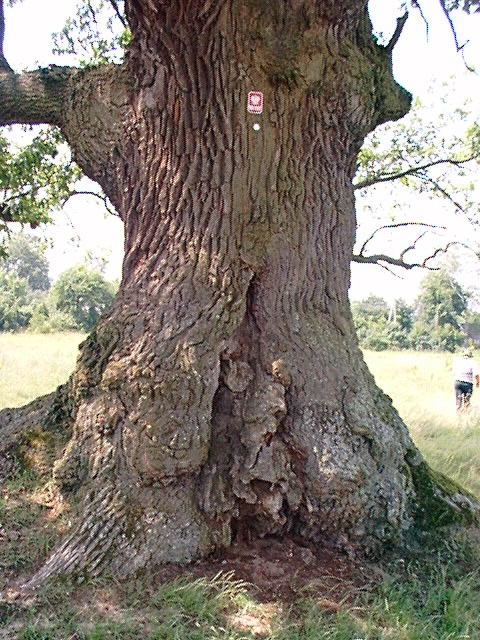
Tree in Przybudki
