= Gmina Narew =

Gmina Narew Narew Commune
- Gmina
- Coat of arms
- Interactive map of Gmina Narew
- Coordinates (Narew): 52°54′46″N 23°31′15″E
- Country: Poland
- Voivodeship: Podlaskie
- County: Hajnówka
- Seat: Narew

Area
  - Total: 339.48 km^{2} (131.07 sq mi)

Population (2006)
  - Total: 4,138
  - Density: 12.19/km^{2} (31.57/sq mi)
- Website: http://www.narew.gmina.pl/

Gmina Narew is a rural gmina (administrative district) in Hajnówka County, Podlaskie Voivodeship, in north-eastern Poland. Its seat is the village of Narew, which lies approximately 21 kilometres (13 mi) north of Hajnówka and 33 km (21 mi) south-east of the regional capital Białystok.

The gmina covers an area of 339.48 square kilometres (131.1 sq mi), and as of 2006 its total population is 4,138.

== Villages ==
Gmina Narew contains the villages and settlements of Ancuty, Białki, Bruszkowszczyzna, Chrabostówka, Cimochy, Cisy, Doratynka, Gorędy, Gorodczyno, Gorodzisko, Gradoczno, Hajdukowszczyzna, Istok, Iwanki, Janowo, Kaczały, Kotłówka, Koweła, Koźliki, Krzywiec, Kutowa, Lachy, Łapuchówka, Łosinka, Makówka, Narew, Nowinnik, Odrynki, Ogrodniki, Paszkowszczyzna, Podborowiska, Przybudki, Puchły, Radzki, Rohozy, Rybaki, Saki, Skaryszewo, Soce, Tokarowszczyzna, Trześcianka, Tyniewicze Duże, Tyniewicze Małe, Usnarszczyzna, Waniewo, Waśki and Zabłocie.

== Neighbouring gminas ==
Gmina Narew is bordered by the gminas of Białowieża, Bielsk Podlaski, Czyże, Hajnówka, Michałowo, Narewka and Zabłudów.
