= Vincent Di Bartoloméo =

French footballer and coach (born 1981)

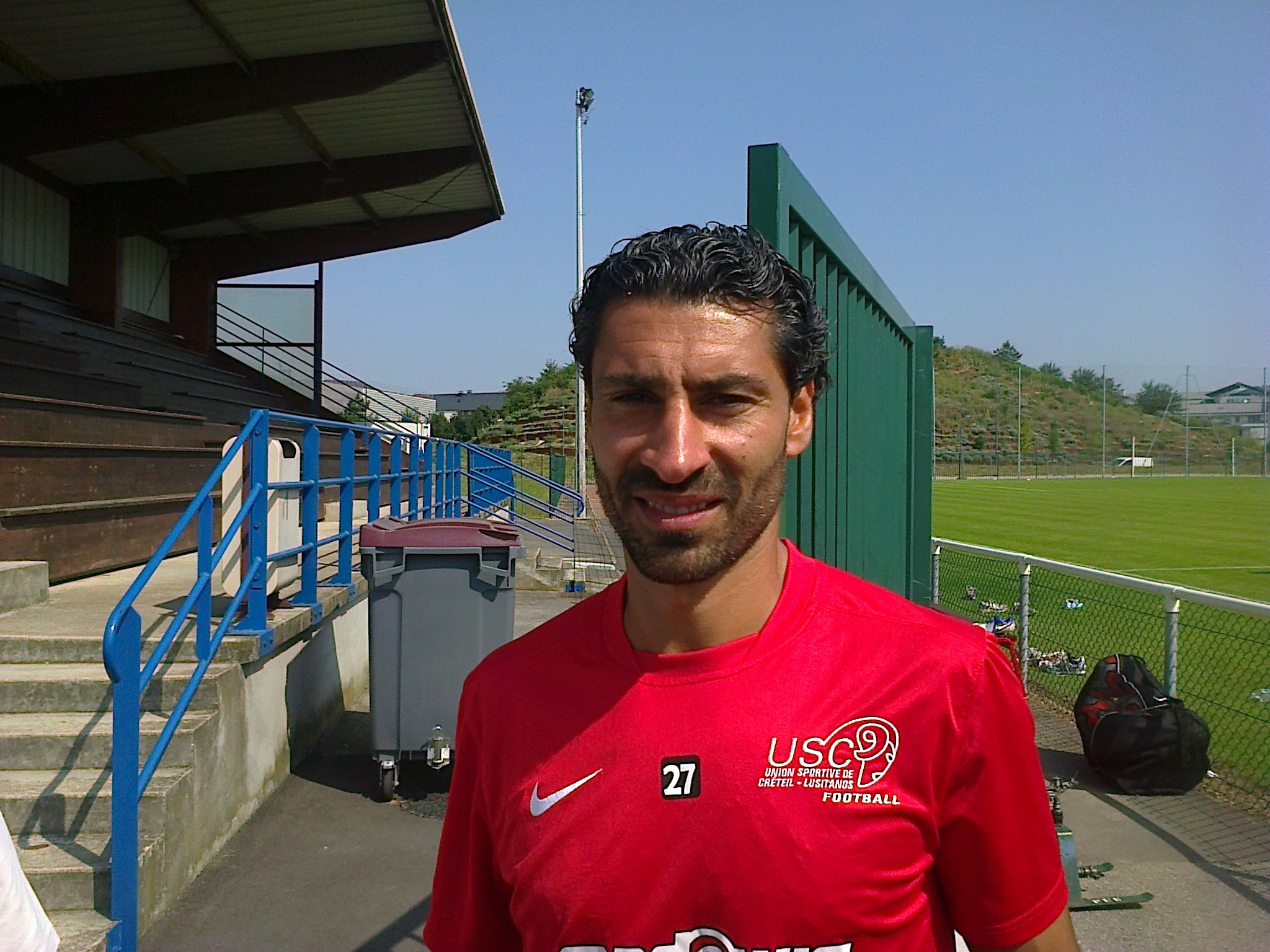

Personal information
- Date of birth: 2 July 1981 (age 45)
- Place of birth: Montluçon, France
- Height: 1.81 m (5 ft 11 in)
- Position: Defender

Team information
- Current team: US Créteil B (Head coach)

Senior career*
Years	Team	Apps	(Gls)
1999–2003	Châteauroux	47	(0)
2003–2007	Pau FC		
2007–2008	FC Sète	36	(2)
2008–2009	US Créteil	37	(2)
2009–2011	Cannes	55	(2)
2011–2017	US Créteil	174	(8)

Managerial career
- 2017–: US Créteil B
- * Club domestic league appearances and goals

Vincent Di Bartoloméo (born 2 July 1981) is a French football coach for US Créteil B, and former professional player.

He played on the professional level in Ligue 2 for LB Châteauroux. Di Bartolomeo was at one stage the record appearance holder for Creteil. He was later overtaken by teammate Boris Mahon de Monaghan.
