= Radzki =

- Village
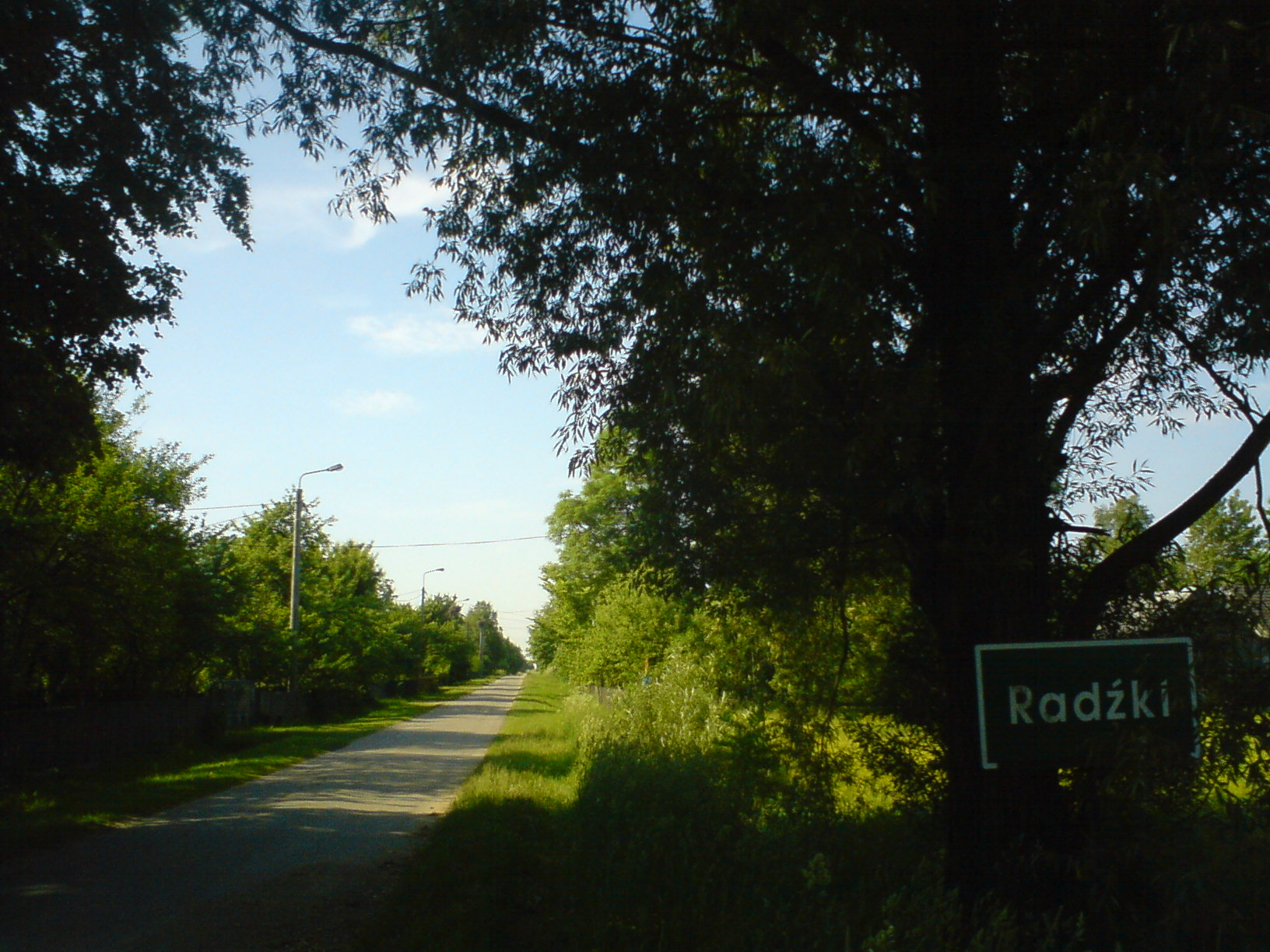
- Road sign in Radźki

- Location within Poland
- Coordinates: 52°50′17″N 23°26′52″E
- Country: Poland
- Voivodeship: Podlaskie
- County: Hajnówka
- Gmina: Narew

Radzki [ˈrat͡ski] is a village in the administrative district of Gmina Narew, within Hajnówka County, Podlaskie Voivodeship, in north-eastern Poland.
