= Podborowiska =

- Village
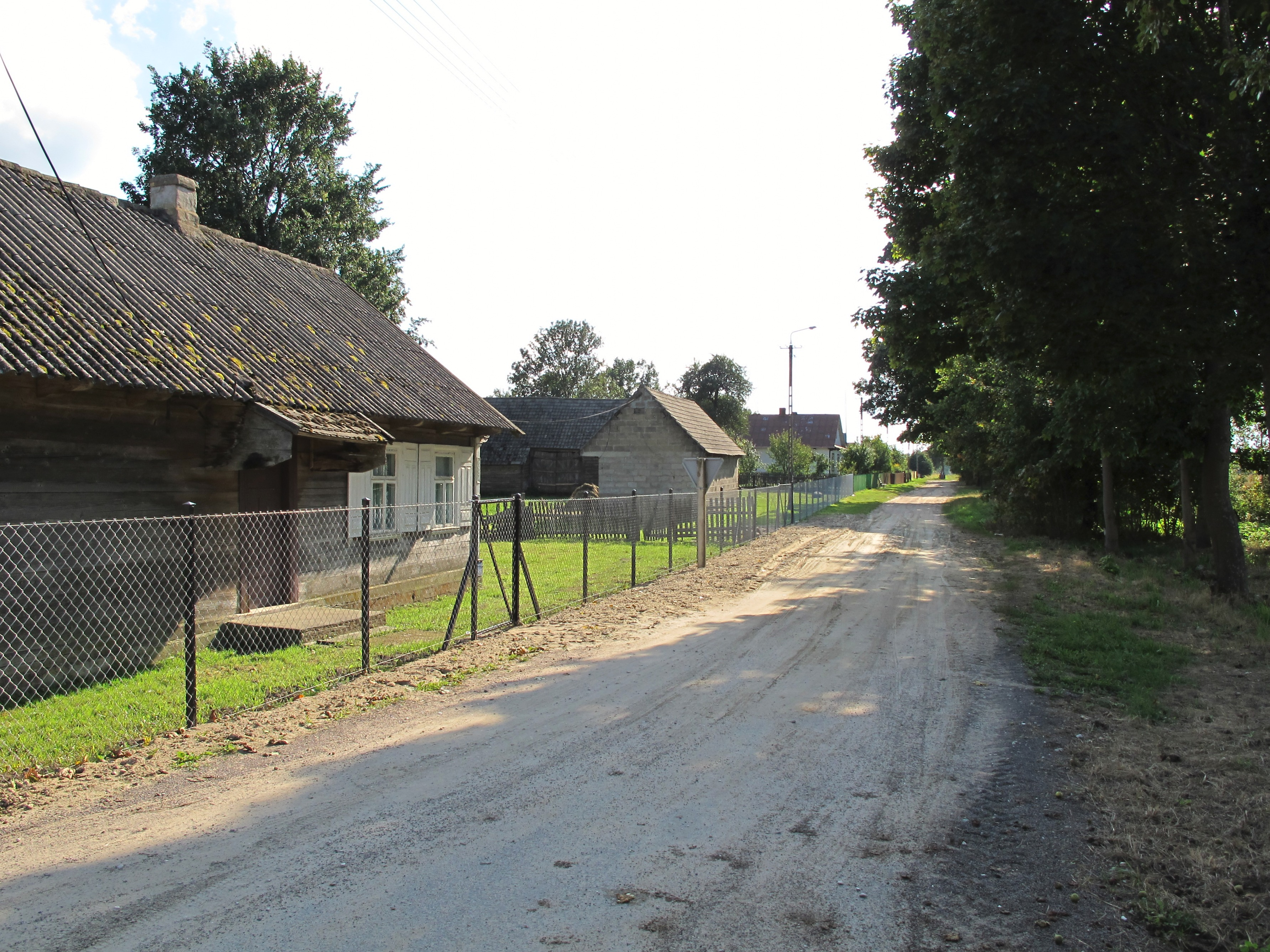

- Location within Poland
- Coordinates: 52°57′19″N 23°31′40″E
- Country: Poland
- Voivodeship: Podlaskie
- County: Hajnówka
- Gmina: Narew

Podborowiska [pɔdbɔrɔˈviska] is a village in the administrative district of Gmina Narew, within Hajnówka County, Podlaskie Voivodeship, in north-eastern Poland.
