= Jordi Delclos =

French professional footballer (born 1985)

Personal information
- Date of birth: 3 July 1985 (age 41)
- Place of birth: Perpignan, France
- Height: 1.70 m (5 ft 7 in)
- Position: Attacking midfielder

Team information
- Current team: Canet Roussillon (sporting director)

Youth career
- Nîmes

Senior career*
Years	Team	Apps	(Gls)
2005–2007	Perpignan Canet		
2007–2010	Agde	34	(10)
2010	Cassis Carnoux	9	(1)
2010–2011	Gap	30	(7)
2011–2013	Fréjus Saint-Raphaël	48	(8)
2013–2014	Arles-Avignon	17	(3)
2014–2015	Lausanne-Sport		
2015–2017	Orléans	35	(4)
2017	Bergerac Foot	10	(3)
2017–2020	Canet Roussillon	50	(9)

Managerial career
- 2020–: Canet Roussillon (sporting director)
- * Club domestic league appearances and goals

Jordi Delclos (born 3 July 1985) is a retired French professional footballer who played as an attacking midfielder.
