= Canet Roussillon FC =

Football club based in Canet-en-Roussillon, France

Canet Roussillon
- Full name: Canet Roussillon Football Club
- Founded: 1934
- Ground: Stade Saint-Michel
- Capacity: 3,400
- Manager: Farid Fouzari
- League: National 3 Group B
- 2022–23: National 2 Group C, 13th
- Website: www.canetrfc.fr
Home colours

Canet Roussillon Football Club is an association football club based in Canet-en-Roussillon, France. It was founded in 1934. The club currently plays in Championnat National 3

== History ==
The club was founded in 1934 as Club Olympique Perpignanais.

In the 2020–21 Coupe de France, Canet Roussillon pulled off an upset victory by beating Ligue 1 giants Marseille, advancing to the round of 16 after a 2–1 win. They were eliminated in the quarter-final of the competition by Montpellier.

In August 2021, Athlon CIF, an Australian fund, invested in Canet Roussillon, injecting €1.5 million into the club. This more than doubled the club's budget.

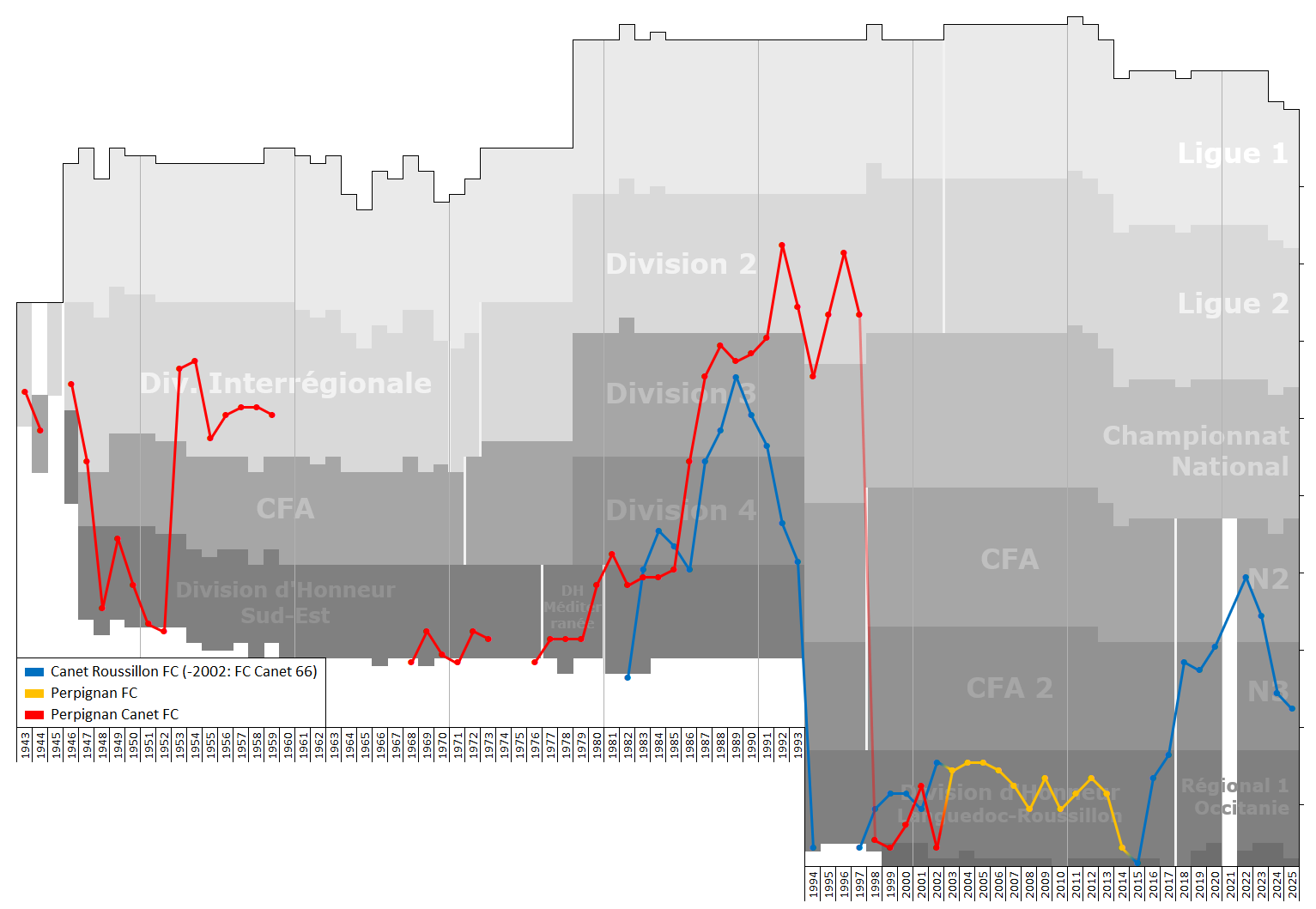
Historical league performance chart of Canet Roussillon FC and its predecessors

=== Historical names ===
- Club Olympique Perpignanais (1934–1949)
- Stade Olympique Perpignanais (1949–1952)
- Perpignan Football Club (1952–1997)
- Sporting Perpignan Roussillon (1997–2001)
- Perpignan Football Catalan (2001–2002)
- Perpignan Canet Football Club (2002–2014)

== Current squad ==
As of 21 March 2019

Note: Flags indicate national team as defined under FIFA eligibility rules; some limited exceptions apply. Players may hold more than one non-FIFA nationality.

No.	Pos.	Nation	Player
—	GK	FRA	Maxime Ferry
—	GK	FRA	Thibault Cottes
—	GK	FRA	Matthieu Nordt
—	DF	FRA	Andrea Aguilar
—	DF	FRA	Boris Mahon de Monaghan
—	DF	FRA	Sébastien Celina
—	DF	FRA	Pascal Vié
—	DF	SEN	Daouda Ba
—	DF	FRA	Malick Lopy
—	DF	FRA	Nicolas Staerck
—	DF	FRA	Lucas Waroquier
—	MF	NIG	Chris Lybohy
—	MF	FRA	Jérémy Posteraro

No.	Pos.	Nation	Player
—	MF	FRA	Marco-Olivier Pioka
—	MF	FRA	Mathieu Castaing
—	MF	FRA	Naim Hamdi
—	MF	FRA	Laurent Carbonne
—	MF	FRA	Yacine Belhadj
—	FW	FRA	Damien Buxeda
—	FW	FRA	Mathieu Ferry
—	FW	FRA	Raphaël Pioton
—	FW	ALG	Sabri Hattab
—	FW	FRA	Cyril Mansuy
—	FW	FRA	Jordi Delclos
—	FW	FRA	Nordine Haizoun

== Notable players ==
- (France) Maxime Estève (youth)
- (Poland) Krzysztof Iwanicki
