= Krzysztof Iwanicki =

Polish footballer (born 1963)

Personal information
- Date of birth: 10 April 1963 (age 63)
- Place of birth: Warsaw, Poland
- Height: 1.69 m (5 ft 7 in)
- Position: Midfielder

Senior career*
Years	Team	Apps	(Gls)
- Olimpia Warsaw
1983	Legia Warsaw II		
1984	Hutnik Warsaw		
1984–1985	Gwardia Warsaw		
1985–1991	Legia Warsaw	136	(16)
1991–1995	Canet	59+	(2+)
1995–1997	Cherbourg		
1997–1998	Mazur Karczew		
1999	Znicz Pruszków		
2000–2001	Mazur Karczew		
2001	Błonianka Błonie		
2002	Świt Warsaw		
2002	Piast Piastów		
2003	Legion Warsaw		
2004–2005	Victoria Głosków		
2005–2006	Absolwent Warsaw		
2008	Tęcza 34 Płońsk		
- * Club domestic league appearances and goals

Krzysztof Iwanicki (born 10 April 1963) is a Polish former professional footballer who played as a midfielder. His brother Leszek and son Sebastian were also footballers.

== Career ==
Before the second half of the 1983–84 season, Iwanicki signed for Polish second-tier side Hutnik Warsaw. In 1985, he signed for Legia Warsaw in the Polish top flight, where he made 136 league appearances and scored 16 goals, helping them win the 1988–89 and 1989–90 Polish Cups. In 1991, Iwanicki signed for French second-tier club Canet, where he suffered relegation to the French third tier and suffered an injury.

In 1995, he signed for Cherbourg in the French fourth tier, helping them earn promotion to the French third tier. In 2001, Iwanicki signed for Polish fourth tier team Błonianka Błonie. Before the second half of the 2002–03 season, he signed for Legion Warsaw in the Polish sixth tier.

== Honours ==
Legia Warsaw

- Polish Cup: 1988–89, 1989–90
- Polish Super Cup: 1989
