= Leszek Iwanicki =

Polish footballer (born 1959)

Personal information
- Full name: Leszek Ryszard Iwanicki
- Date of birth: 12 August 1959 (age 67)
- Place of birth: Warsaw, Poland
- Height: 1.72 m (5 ft 8 in)
- Position: Midfielder

Youth career
- 1969–1972: DKS Targówek

Senior career*
Years	Team	Apps	(Gls)
- Polonez Warsaw
1981–1983	Legia Warsaw	31	(1)
1983–1986	Motor Lublin	74	(26)
1986–1989	Widzew Łódź	74	(15)
1989	Yukong Elephants	8	(0)
1989–1993	Widzew Łódź	111	(35)
1993	Umeå FC		
1993	La Roche VF		
1993	SK Vorwärts Steyr		
1993	Urania Geneva		
1994–1995	Polonia Bytom	26	(5)
1995–1996	RKS Radomsko		
1996	Marko Walichnowy		
1997–2000	Zawisza Rzgów		
2000–2001	Piast Gliwice		
2001	Zawisza Rzgów		

International career
1987	Poland	2	(0)
- * Club domestic league appearances and goals

Leszek Ryszard Iwanicki (born 12 August 1959) is a Polish former professional footballer who played as a midfielder. His brother Krzysztof and nephew Sebastian were also footballers.

His previous clubs were Piast Gliwice, Zawisza Rzgów, Marko Walichnowy, RKS Radomsko, Polonia Bytom, Widzew Łódź, Motor Lublin, Legia Warsaw, and Urania Geneva in Switzerland, SK Vorwärts Steyr in Austria, La Roche VF in France, Umeå FC in Sweden, and Yukong Elephants in South Korea.

He was first Polish player of K League with Tadeusz Świątek.

== Honours ==
Yukong Elephants

- K League: 1989

Individual

- Ekstraklasa top scorer: 1984–85
