= Lachy, Podlaskie Voivodeship =

Lachy
- Village
- Location within Poland
- Coordinates: 52°52′N 23°22′E
- Country: Poland
- Voivodeship: Podlaskie
- County: Hajnówka
- Gmina: Narew
- Population: 49

Lachy [ˈlaxɨ] is a village in the administrative district of Gmina Narew, within Hajnówka County, Podlaskie Voivodeship, in northeast Poland.
