= Iwanki, Podlaskie Voivodeship =

Iwanki
- Village
- Location within Poland
- Coordinates: 52°57′N 23°31′E
- Country: Poland
- Voivodeship: Podlaskie
- County: Hajnówka
- Gmina: Narew
- Population: 110

Iwanki [iˈvaŋkʲi] is a village in the administrative district of Gmina Narew, within Hajnówka County, Podlaskie Voivodeship, in north-eastern Poland.
