= Białki, Podlaskie Voivodeship =

Białki
- Village
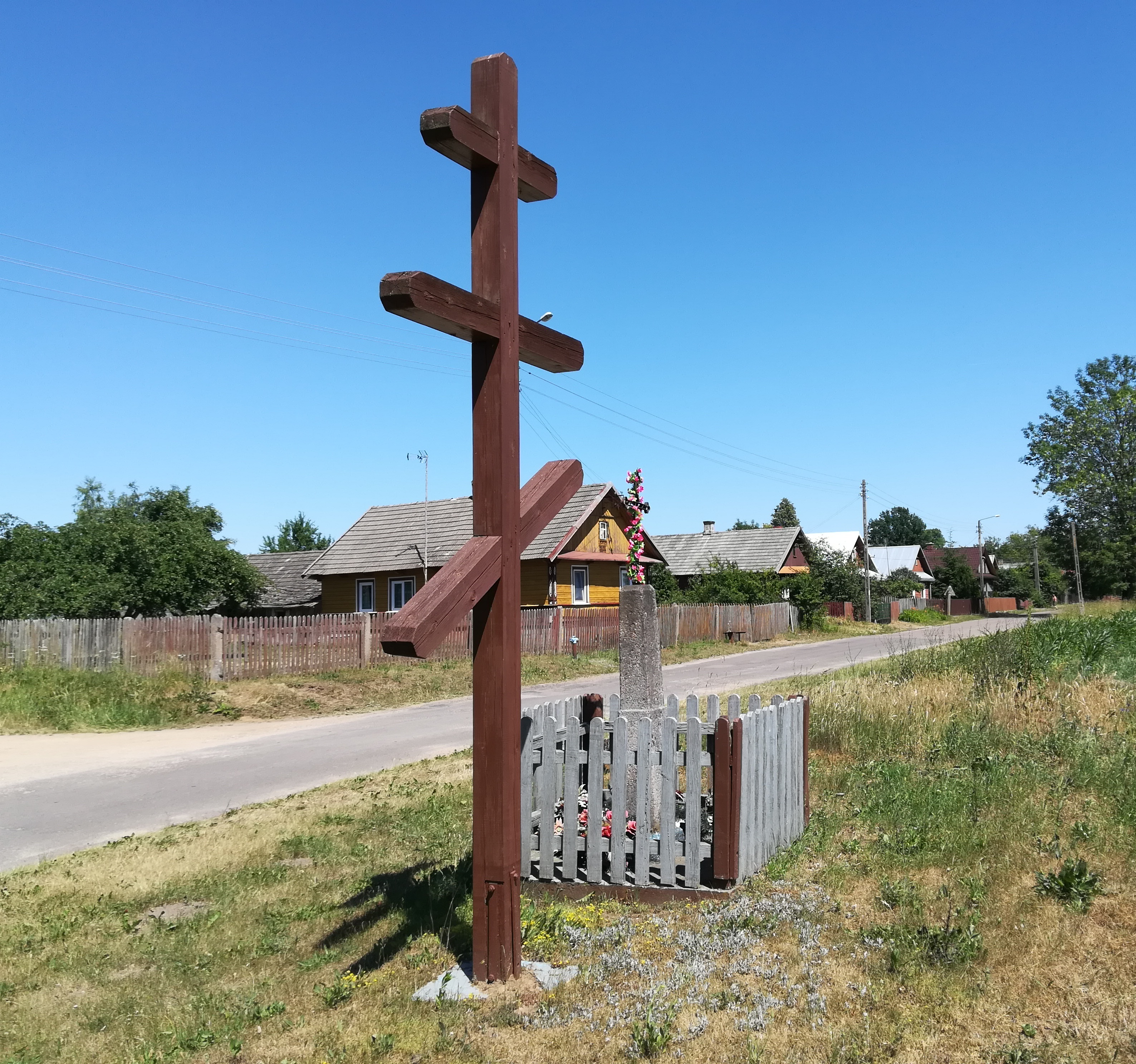

- Location within Poland
- Coordinates: 52°58′5″N 23°27′43″E
- Country: Poland
- Voivodeship: Podlaskie
- County: Hajnówka
- Gmina: Narew
- Population: 100

Białki [ˈbjau̯ki] is a village in the administrative district of Gmina Narew, within Hajnówka County, Podlaskie Voivodeship, in north-eastern Poland.
