= Basil Doroszkiewicz =

Polish Orthodox Metropolitan (1914–1998)

His Eminence Basil
- Metropolitan of Warsaw and All Poland; Metropolita warszawski i całej Polski
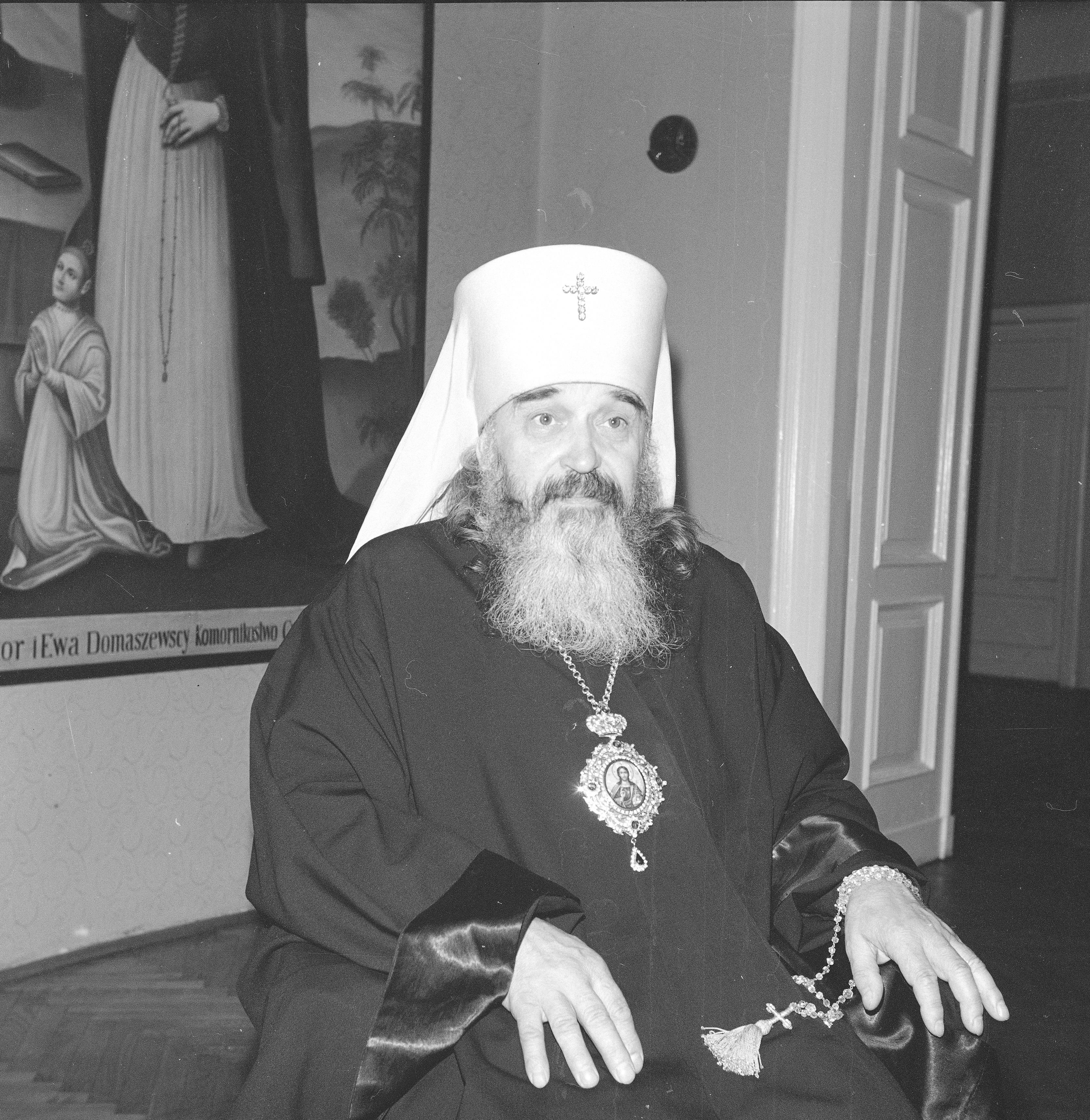
- Native name: Włodzimierz Doroszkiewicz
- Church: Polish Orthodox Church
- Elected: 24 January 1970
- Installed: 1 March 1970
- Term ended: 11 February 1998
- Predecessor: George (Korenistov)
- Successor: Sawa (Hryuniack)

Orders
- Ordination: 17 April 1938
- Consecration: 25 March 1960

Personal details
- Born: March 15, 1914 Cisy, Grodno Governorate, Russian Empire
- Died: February 11, 1998 (aged 83) Warsaw, Masovian Voivodeship, Poland
- Buried: Orthodox Cemetery in Warsaw
- Denomination: Eastern Orthodox Christianity
- Spouse: Margaryta Doroszkiewicz (divorced 1959)
- Children: 3
- Education: Vilnius Theological Seminary

Metropolitan Basil (Polish: Metropolita Bazyli; secular name: Włodzimierz Doroszkiewicz, Russian: Владимир Алексеевич Дорошкевич; b. 15 March 1914, Cisy, Grodno Governorate, Russian Empire - d. 11 February 1998, Warsaw, Masovian Voivodeship, Poland) was a Polish Orthodox Bishop, the fifth Metropolitan of Warsaw and All Poland, head of the Polish Orthodox Church from 1970 to his death in 1998.

In 1938, he was ordained a presbyter. Until 1960, he conducted pastoral work in various parishes in the Białystok Region and the Grodno region. In December 1959, he made his perpetual vows, taking the name Bazyli. The following year he was ordained Bishop of Bielsko, vicar of the Warsaw-Bielsk diocese, where he remained for a year. Then, from 1962 to 1970, he was the bishop of Wrocław and Szczecin. As the Ordinary of that diocese, he contributed to the organization of several dozen new parishes created to meet the needs of those displaced by Operation "Wisła". In 1970, he assumed the office of Metropolitan of Warsaw and all Poland. During his term as head of Polish Orthodox Church, there was a significant revival of contacts with other local Orthodox Churches, as well as the opening of four monasteries and the establishment of two new dioceses and the Orthodox Ordinariate of the Polish People's Army.

== Life ==
=== Education and priesthood ===
He was born in the small village of Cisy, baptized in the Church of the Exaltation of the Cross of the Lord in Narew, in the then Hajnówka County, into a peasant family of Aleksy and Maria Doroszkiewicz, as one of six children.

He studied at the theological seminary in Vilnius from 1927 to 1936, where he also obtained his high school graduation examination. After graduating from the seminary, he applied for the admission to study at the Center for Orthodox Theology at the University of Warsaw. His candidacy was rejected because he declared Belarusian nationality in the survey. He then went to Grodno, where Bishop Antoni (Marcenko) sent him to work in the Orthodox parish in Svislach as a psalmist. On 6 September 1937, as a married man, he was ordained a deacon by bishop Sava (Sovetov). The same bishop recommended him to study at the Orthodox Theology School in Warsaw, thanks to whom Włodzimierz Doroszkiewicz was accepted this time.

On 17 April 1938, he was ordained a priest. He conducted pastoral ministry in Łyskowo, Gronostawice, Svislach, Michałowo (in the years 1940–1943 as an assistant priest and until 1946 as the rector) and in Gródek.

During World War II, he was repressed by both the Soviet and German authorities (he was reported to the Gestapo). After the end of the war, he had a positive attitude towards the socialist system introduced in Poland.

He worked in the last mentioned town from 1946 to 1960, directing the works on the construction of the parish church. Between 1957 and 1960, he combined his pastoral service with the work of a lecturer at the Orthodox theological seminary in Warsaw.

With his wife Margaryta, he had daughters Iraida and Mirosława and a son Jerzy. In 1959, however, he decided to separate from his wife and take monastic vows. According to his own memories, the motive for this decision was, apart from his vocation as a monk, the difficult financial situation of his family.

On 30 December 1959 Włodzimierz Doroszkiewicz took perpetual monastic vows in the monastery of St. Onufry in Jabłeczna and took the name Bazyli. On 11 January 1960, he was granted the dignity of Archimandrite.

=== Episcopacy ===
On 25 March 1960, in the Cathedral of St. Mary Magdalene in Warsaw, he was consecrated a Bishop and was appointed Vicar Bishop of the Warsaw-Bielsk diocese with the title of Bishop of Bielsko.

On 5 May 1961, Bishop Bazyli was transferred to the Wrocław-Szczecin diocese. In the new diocese, he significantly contributed to the creation of its cathedral, the Cathedral of the Nativity of the Blessed Virgin Mary (Polish: Sobór Narodzenia Przenajświętszej Bogurodzicy we Wrocławiu). In 1962, based on his work on Catholic Mariology in the first half of the 20th century, he received a master's degree in theology, completing his studies that he began before World War II.

In the same year, after the election of Archbishop Timothy (Szretter) as Metropolitan of Warsaw and All Poland, Bishop Bazyli protested against this decision of the bishops' council as being made contrary to the provisions of the Church's statute (according to him, the local council should choose the superior).

In 1962, in a note from the Office for Religious Affairs, bishop Bazyli was described as a "limited" man, with little political experience, associated with the "most devotional" circles of the Church. Four years earlier, the priest had been recruited to cooperate with the Security Service in Białystok.

In the Wrocław-Szczecin diocese, Bishop Bazyli organized church life among the people who were resettled to the western lands of Poland as a result of Operation Vistula and repatriation from the Eastern Borderlands. He created 42 new parishes. He also sent letters to the Office for Religious Affairs in which he emphasized problems with staffing the parishes of the diocese, the low level of education of clergy, and suggested organizing two-year courses in Wrocław preparing for priestly ordination, as well as further theological studies at the Christian Theological Academy. He suggested that the courses could prepare clergy serving in Polish to work in the diocese, which would bring benefits to both the church and the state. The bishop was a supporter of the polonization of his diocese and was reluctant towards the Ukrainians living there. He believed that Ukrainian nationalism might be revived in their community, which would then lead to internal conflicts in the church, preventing its normal functioning.

Bishop Bazyli Doroszkiewicz worked to create an Orthodox diocese covering the area of Subcarpathian Voivodeship, which was to constitute a base for missionary activities among Greek Catholic Church followers: Ukrainians and Lemkos. In the 1960s, he sent several letters to the Office for Religious Affairs, in which he suggested establishing a diocese of Krakow-Rzeszów or Sanok-Przemyśl, which would be headed by, after taking monastic vows, Aleksander Dubec.

=== As Metropolitan of Warsaw and All Poland ===
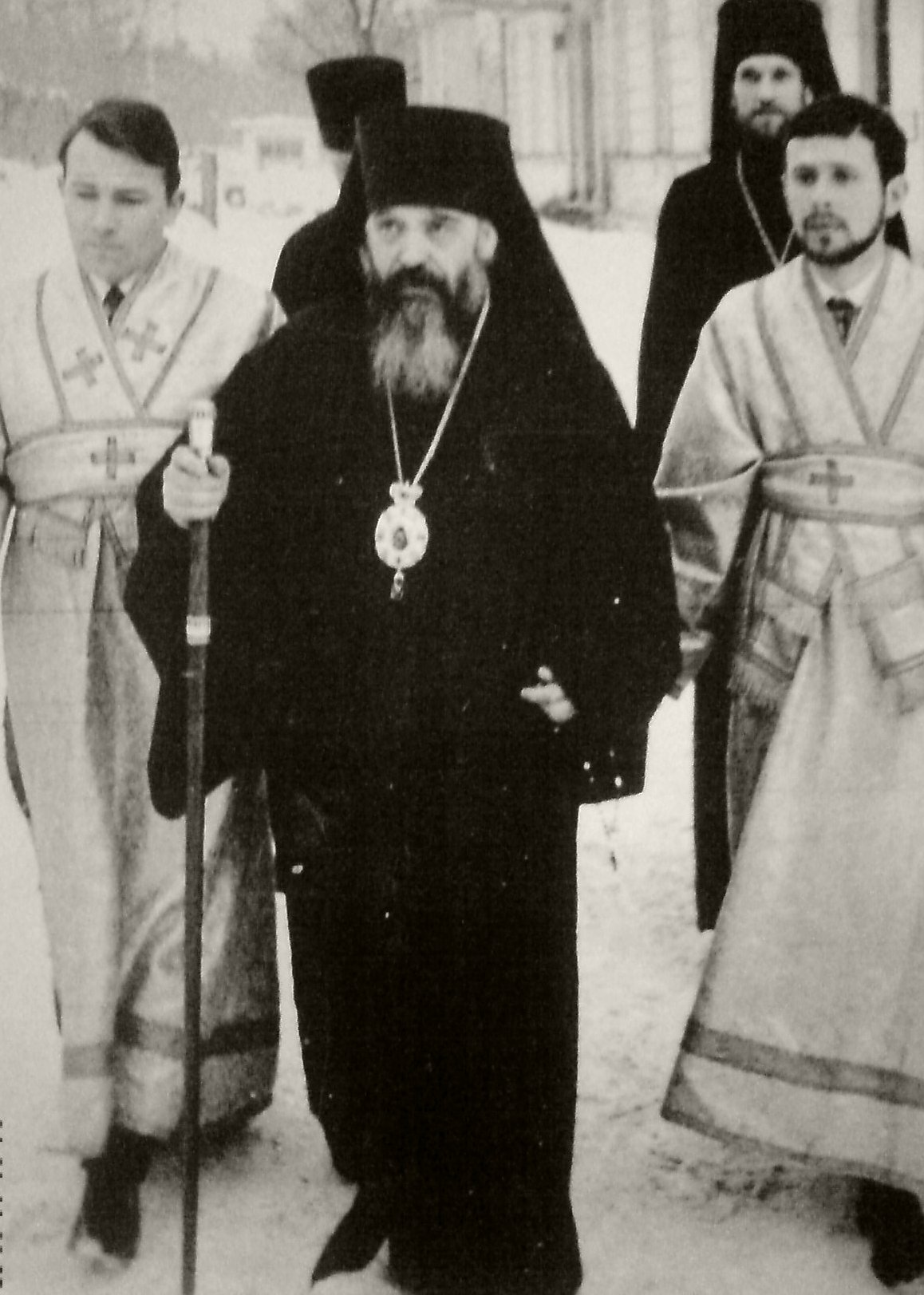
Bazyli in 1970

After the death of Metropolitan Stefan (Rudyk) of Warsaw and all Poland, he was elected as his successor on 24 January 1970. The state authorities supported the candidacy of Bishop Bazyli as the new head of the Polish Orthodox Church due to the content of the memorandum he had previously submitted with proposals for transformations in the church and the new nationality policy of Polish Orthodox Church. The Office for Religious Affairs also found that Bazyli's unfavourable attitude towards the Polish Catholic Episcopate and his support for the ecumenical movement, as well as his understanding of the changes taking place in the world, were in his favor. Finally, it was found that Bazyli was a spokesman for the Polish and socialist raison d'état both in his domestic and foreign activities.

The enthronement of the new head of the Church took place on March 1, 1970, in the Cathedral of St. Mary Magdalene in Warsaw under the leadership of Patriarch Ephrem II of Georgia, with the participation of delegations from the Patriarchates of Constantinople, Moscow, Romania, Serbia, Bulgaria and the Autocephalous Churches of Georgia, Czechoslovakia and Greece. According to the researcher Antoni Mironowicz, his election as Metropolitan of Warsaw and all of Poland was a key event in the process of regaining stability by Polish Orthodox Church after World War II.

On 12 October 1970, the metropolitan founded the Polish-speaking Church of Saints Cyril and Methodius in Wrocław, at that time the only such pastoral institution in Poland. He was convinced that only the polonization of pastoral care in the diocese would prevent the development of ethnic conflicts in its territory, as well as stop the departure of the faithful to the Catholic Church.

In the year of the election of Metropolitan Bazyli, with his participation, work on the new internal statute of Polish Orthodox Church and the parish statute were finalized. In the same year, the council of bishops, under the direction of the metropolitan, also reorganized the schools run by the church, including the theological seminary in Warsaw. A new church press organ was also established, in addition to the Russian-language Tserkovny Vestnik, the news of the Polish Orthodox Church began to be published in Polish.

In the years 1971–1972, the metropolitan corresponded with the Catholic Primate of Poland, Stefan Wyszyński, regarding Orthodox-Catholic conflicts over the ownership of religious buildings in Polany, Komańcza and Rokosowo. He also continued efforts to create a diocese, or at least two deaneries, in Podkarpacie.

In 1971, he was registered as a secret collaborator with the pseudonym Włodzimierz. According to the assumptions of the Security Service of the Polish People's Republic, his cooperation was to consist in infiltrating the Church and "nationalist circles" within it and abroad, as well as acting against the Roman Catholic Church. He was considered to be one of the most valuable secret collaborators among the Orthodox clergy.

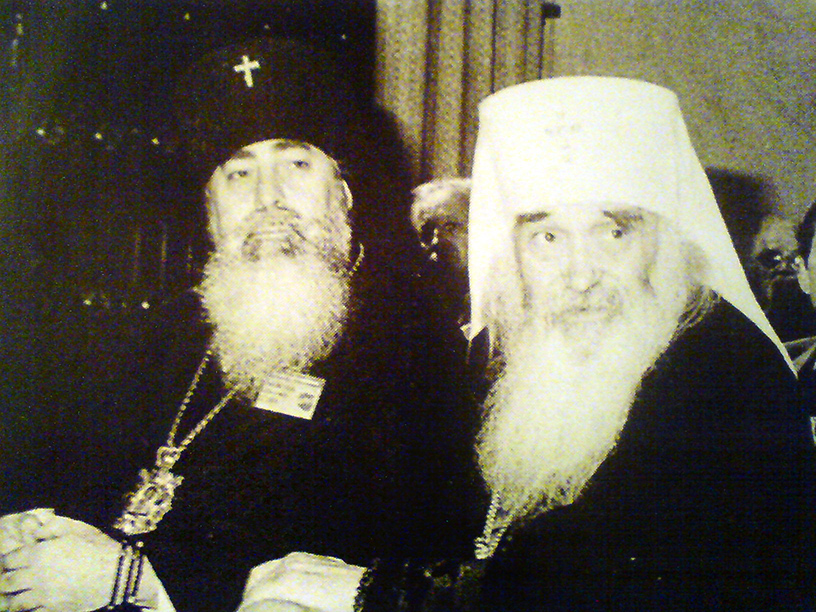
Bazyli (right) with Russian Bishop Vladimir (Kotlyarov)

As the head of PAKP, Bazyli Doroszkiewicz contributed to the reactivation of the Annunciation Monastery in Supraśl and the founding of monasteries in Wojnów, Białystok-Dojlidy and Ujkowice, as well as to the construction of over 100 Orthodox churches and chapels throughout the country. Moreover, during his term of office as Metropolitan of Warsaw and all Poland, two new dioceses were established: Przemyśl-Nowo Sącz (after many years of the metropolitan's efforts, it was finally established in 1983) and Lublin-Chełm (in 1989). In 1994, the Orthodox Ordinariate of the Polish Army, operating under the rights of a diocese, began its operations. Metropolitan Bazyli also admitted the autonomous Portuguese Orthodox Church and two parishes in Italy to the jurisdiction of Polish Orthodox Church. In 1994, he conducted the canonization of Maxim Sandovich (from now on known as Saint Maksym of Gorlicki), which was the first such event in the church.

During his tenure as primate of the Polish Orthodox Church has developed extensive cooperation with other orthodox churches. During his term of office, he visited the Ecumenical Patriarchate of Constantinople, the Russian Orthodox Church, the Greek Orthodox Church, the Bulgarian Orthodox Church, the Romanian Orthodox Church, the Orthodox Church of the Czech Lands and Slovakia, the Orthodox Church in America and the autonomous Orthodox Church of Finland. He was also a participant in the ecumenical movement: he took part in the work of the Christian Peace Conference and was vice-president of the Polish Ecumenical Council. The metropolitan developed Polish Orthodox Church's charitable and social activities. In 1991, he initiated the establishment of the parish of St. Michael the Archangel the Iconographic Study School, and in 1996 the School of Psalmists and Orthodox Church Conductors in Hajnówka. He also contributed to the creation of new organizations bringing together lay faithful of the church, including the Orthodox Youth Brotherhood.

=== Death ===
He died in Warsaw of a stroke. In the last month of his life, when he was in hospital, he was unable to fulfill his duties as metropolitan. The funeral ceremonies took place on 13 February 1998, in the cathedral in Warsaw, in the presence of representatives of the Patriarchate of Constantinople (Metropolitan Jeremia (Kaligiorgis) of Paris) and the Patriarchate of Moscow (Metropolitan Pitirim (Nechayev) of Volokolamsk), representatives of state authorities and other churches operating in Poland. He was buried in the Orthodox cemetery of Warsaw in the Wola district.

Eastern Orthodox Church titles
Preceded by George (Korenistov)	Metropolitan of Warsaw and all Poland; 1970–1998	Succeeded by Sawa (Hrycuniak)
