= Stefan Rudyk =

Head of the Polish Orthodox Church from 1965 to 1969

Stefan
- Metropolitan of Warsaw and all Poland
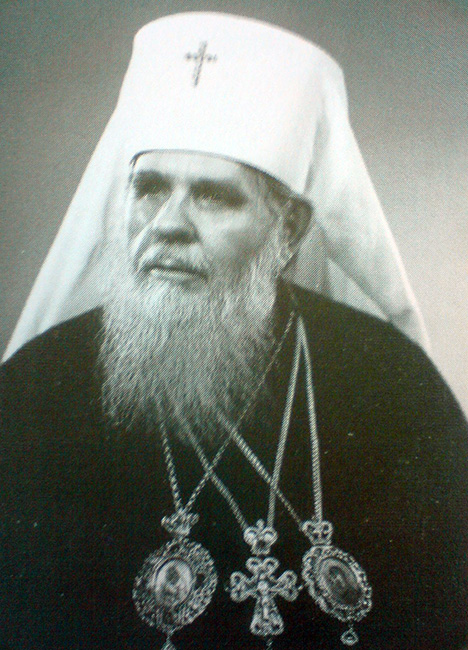
- Church: Polish Orthodox Church
- Diocese: Diocese of Warsaw–Bielsko
- In office: 1965–1969
- Predecessor: George Korenistov
- Successor: George Korenistov

Orders
- Consecration: 22 March 1953

Personal details
- Born: Stepan Rudyk; December 27, 1891 Majdan Lipowiecki
- Died: March 26, 1969 (aged 77) Warsaw
- Buried: Orthodox Cemetery, Warsaw
- Denomination: Eastern Orthodoxy

Stefan, secular name Stepan Rudyk (born 27 December 1891 in Majdan Lipowiecki, died 26 March 1969 in Warsaw) was the fourth Metropolitan of Warsaw and all Poland, the head of the Polish Orthodox Church from 1965 to 1969 of Ukrainian descent.

He was a graduate of the seminary in Oryol. From 1922 to 1939, he served as the pastor of various Orthodox parishes designated for Polish soldiers of this denomination. After the September Campaign, he withdrew with the Polish forces to Romania and was interned there. In 1941, he became a chaplain of the prisoner-of-war camp in Dorsten. Thanks to the intervention of the International Red Cross, he was allowed to live in Berlin, and after two years, he arrived in occupied Łódź. In this city, he served in the Alexander Nevsky Cathedral for ten years. In 1953, he was consecrated as the Bishop of Wrocław and Szczecin, a position he held for eight years. Then, from 1961 to 1965, he was the Bishop of Białystok and Gdańsk, after which the council of bishops of the Polish Orthodox Church elected him as its head.

As the leader of the church, Metropolitan Stefan continued his efforts to convert the Greek Catholic population to Orthodoxy. He also re-established contacts with other autocephalous churches and served as the vice-chairman of the Polish Ecumenical Council.

== Early life ==
=== Before World War II ===
He was born in Majdan Lipowiecki in the Yavoriv Raion to a Ukrainian peasant family of Greek Catholic faith, the son of Piotr Rudyk and Anna Troper. His father was a Russophile and was interned by the Austrian authorities during World War I in the Thalerhof camp near Graz, where he died.

In 1911, Stepan Rudyk graduated from high school in Lviv, after which he went to Russia, where he began his studies at the Orthodox Volhynian Theological Seminary in Zhytomyr. He then transferred to the seminary in Oryol, which he completed in 1915. He married Julianna Czornij. On 3 May 1915, he was ordained a priest by Bishop Dionysius Waledyński of Kremenets and was appointed vicar of the parish of St. Nicholas in Kremenets. In the same month, he also became the parson in Ponykovytsia in the Brody Raion, as one of the Orthodox missionaries of Bishop Eulogius of Chełm. After the evacuation of Russian troops in October 1915, he served as a priest among refugees in the Nowiny colony in the Novograd-Volynsky Uyezd. In August 1918, he was appointed parson in Moskalówka in the Proskurov uezd, from where he moved to Podzamcze in the Kremenets Raion in October 1921.

On 25 August 1922, he was accepted into the Polish Armed Forces as a military official of the ninth rank. On 8 January 1924, he was confirmed in the rank of chaplain of the reserve in the military chaplaincy of the Orthodox faith and remained in active service. His first parish was the military parish of St. Nicholas in Toruń. Father Stepan Rudyk became involved in its creation, as well as in the life of the local Russian community. His activities on behalf of the Russians raised objections from the Polish military authorities and led in 1927 to his transfer to Grudziądz. He then served in Orthodox military parishes in Katowice (1927–1936) and Kraków (1936–1939). He was promoted to senior chaplain with seniority from 19 March 1938, and ranked first in the military chaplaincy of the Orthodox faith. In March 1939, he was the head of the Orthodox pastoral care in Military District No. 1.

=== World War II and post-war years ===
After the outbreak of World War II in September 1939, as a result of a bombing raid on a military hospital in Warsaw, his wife was killed. Father Rudyk withdrew with the Polish forces to Romania and was interned there. He stayed in the camps at Călimănești and Târgu Jiu. Then, in 1941, he was handed over to the Germans and transferred to Oflag VI E in Dorsten, Westphalia, as a chaplain. Thanks to the intervention of Father Rudyk's orphaned sons, supported by the International Red Cross, he was granted permission in February 1942 to leave the camp and was allowed to reside in Berlin as a vicar of the parish at the Resurrection of Christ Cathedral, belonging to the Diocese of Berlin and Germany of the Russian Orthodox Church Outside of Russia. He could not return to Warsaw, to the territory of the General Government, as a former chaplain in the Polish Armed Forces.

From 1943 to 1953, Father Rudyk lived in Łódź, where he served as the parson of the Alexander Nevsky Cathedral. In 1943, he saved the cathedral bells from confiscation by bricking them up in the church tower. These bells were restored to liturgical use after the liberation of Łódź. As a widowed priest, he took perpetual vows in 1948 and was raised to the rank of archimandrite. He actively participated in the life of the Russian community in Łódź. According to preserved records, on 27 October 1948, he signed an agreement to cooperate with the Security Office as a secret collaborator under the code name Fidelis. He was also supposed to cooperate with the KGB.

=== Bishop ===
On 9 December 1952, Metropolitan Macarius Oksiyuk of Warsaw and all Poland presented three candidates for episcopal consecration and the assumption of the Wrocław and Szczecin cathedrals to the Synod of Bishops of the Polish Orthodox Church: Father Nikanor Niesłuchowski, Father Jan Lewiarz, and Archimandrite Stefan Rudyk. Among the presented proposals, the bishops chose Archimandrite Stefan.

The consecration of Archimandrite Stefan took place on 22 March 1953, at the Cathedral of St. Mary Magdalene in Warsaw. The consecration was performed by Metropolitan Makary of Warsaw and All Poland, Archbishop of Białystok and Gdańsk Timothy Szretter, and Bishop of Łódź and Poznań George Korenistov. Assessing the state of the diocese he was to lead in the same year, the bishop described the situation as difficult, primarily due to the lack of a sufficient number of clergy.

In 1958, Bishop Stefan took the lead of the Missionary Committee established by the Polish Orthodox Church, aimed at converting the Ukrainian population of Greek Catholic faith to Orthodoxy. He also made special efforts to organize religious education for children and youth in individual parishes. According to Piotr Gerent, the scope of this mission should not be overestimated. There were no cases of forcing Greek Catholics to adopt Orthodoxy, and in the political reality of the time, the Ukrainian and Lemko populations in western Poland had only a choice between Latin Catholicism and Orthodoxy.

The activities of the Missionary Committee also extended to the Subcarpathian region, where the Religious Affairs Office decided to transfer former Greek Catholic churches to the Orthodox, including in places where Greek Catholics had returned after 1956. These faithful were supposed to transition to the Polish Orthodox Church according to the intentions of the Polish authorities. The coordination of the Missionary Committee's activities in the Subcarpathian region was handled by Father Jan Lewiarz.

In 1961, elevated to the rank of archbishop, he was simultaneously transferred to the Białystok-Gdańsk diocese.

According to preserved documents, in 1963, the Security Office considered the possibility of sending him to the Soviet Union to surveil individuals of interest to the KGB. A year later, he was identified as one of the most valuable secret collaborators of the Security Office among the recruited Polish Orthodox clergy. In 1966, when he was already the Metropolitan of Warsaw and all Poland, he was described as a secret collaborator "not utilized due to his position".

==== Metropolitan of Warsaw and all Poland ====
On 26 May 1965, he was elected Metropolitan of Warsaw and all Poland. This choice came three years after the death of his predecessor, Metropolitan Timothy, at the Warsaw Cathedral. The fact that the Polish Orthodox Church had been without a leader for three years was due to the stance of the state authorities, who did not permit the consecration of a fourth hierarch, thus preventing the church from reaching the canonical number of bishops. Only in 1964 did the authorities allow the ordination of the fourth bishop – Father Mikołaj Niesłuchowski, who took the monastic name Nikanor.

According to information from Rzeczpospolita, Archbishop Stefan's election as metropolitan was decided by the support of state authorities. They prevented Archbishop George Korenistov, who had been serving as locum tenens of the Warsaw metropolis from 1962 to 1965, from assuming leadership of the Polish Orthodox Church due to his anti-communist views. Stefan Rudyk was seen as the only acceptable candidate for the communists, as he had experience in church work and showed complete loyalty to the authorities. His election was positively received by the faithful of the Polish Orthodox Church.

During his tenure, relations between the Catholic and Orthodox churches in Poland significantly deteriorated. The Orthodox hierarchy, under the clear influence of the Office for Religious Affairs, together with state authorities, criticized a letter from the Polish episcopate to German bishops. During Orthodox celebrations of the millennium of the Polish state on 22 July 1966, at the Cathedral of St. Mary Magdalene, he delivered a speech thanking the authorities of the Polish People's Republic for bringing true freedom to Polish Orthodox believers. During his leadership of the Polish Orthodox Church, the church took a negative stance on the possibility of closer ecumenical dialogue with the Roman Catholic Church and skeptically assessed the effects and declarations of the Second Vatican Council.

As metropolitan, he established a social fund for the clergy and initiated work on a new internal statute for the Polish Orthodox Church (completed after his death in 1970). He initiated the renovation of the Metropolitan Cathedral in Warsaw and several other Orthodox churches in Poland. He continued his efforts to develop Orthodox structures in the Rzeszów Voivodeship, but was unable to take over the former Greek Catholic cathedral in Przemyśl for the needs of the Polish Orthodox Church or establish a separate diocese covering Subcarpathia. These actions, in addition to providing pastoral care for the Orthodox population, were also a continuation of his previous efforts to convert Greek Catholics to Orthodoxy. The center of Orthodox mission in the Rzeszów Voivodeship remained in Sanok.

In 1966, as part of personnel reorganization, Metropolitan Stefan removed Father Jan Lewiarz, who had been directing the local parish of the Holy Trinity for eight years, accusing him of organizational and personal misconduct. He did not withdraw these accusations even when the Religious Affairs Office supported the priest's continued presence in the Rzeszów Voivodeship.

He paid particular attention to overseeing parish life, regularly conducting personal visitations to parishes, organizing deanery and diocesan conferences for clergy to raise their spiritual level and discipline. He also introduced the obligation for clergy to undergo pastoral practice at the Warsaw Cathedral after ordination.

During his tenure as Metropolitan of Warsaw and all Poland, the Polish Orthodox Church again established broader contacts with other autocephalous Orthodox Churches. Stefan Rudyk also participated in preparations for the Pan-Orthodox Council. He made many foreign trips and also served as vice-chairman of the Polish Ecumenical Council.

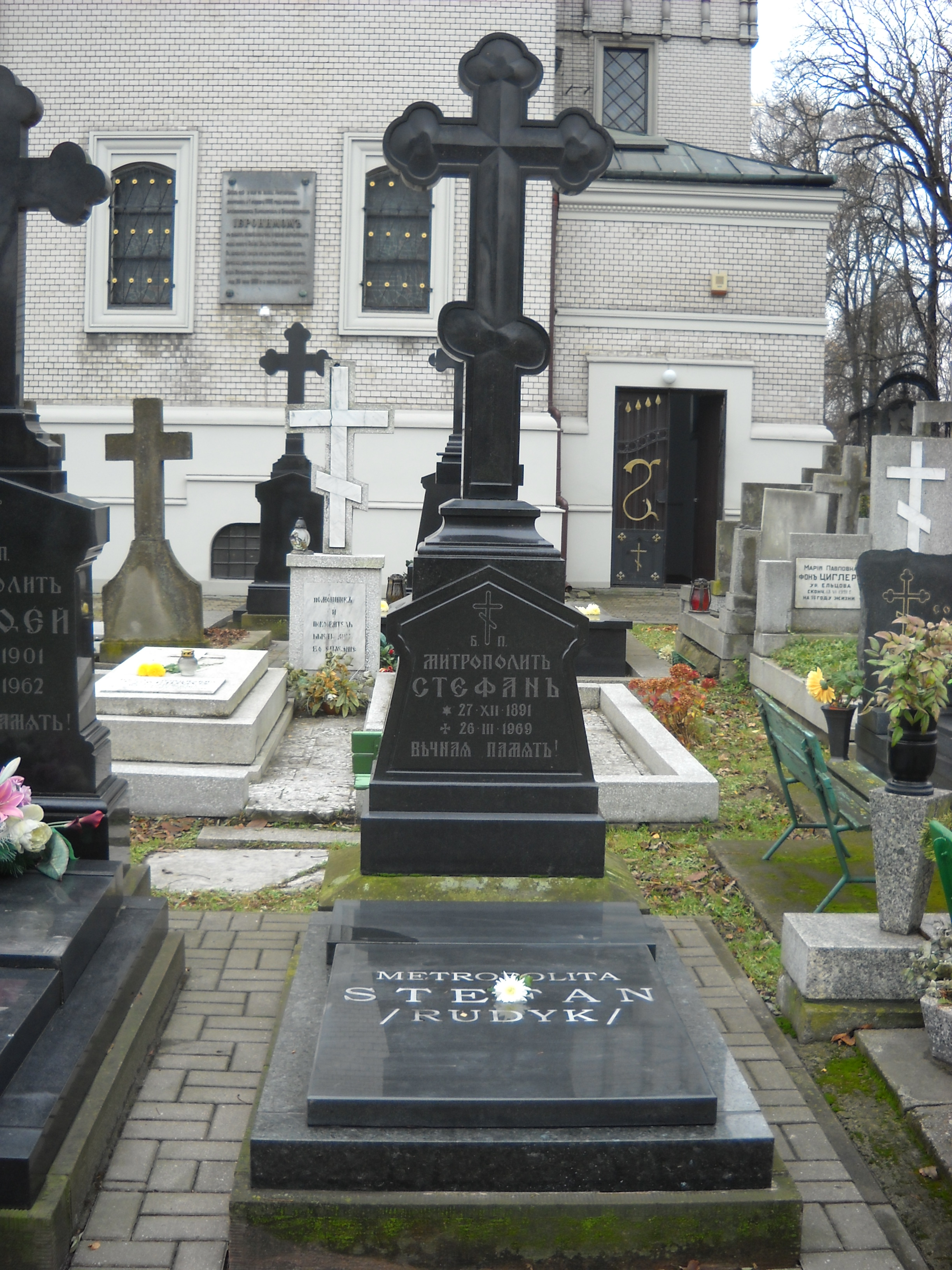
Metropolitan Stefan's grave in the Orthodox cemetery in Warsaw's Wola district

He died suddenly on 26 March 1969 in Warsaw. The previous day, on the Feast of the Annunciation, he served the Holy Liturgy at the Metropolitan Cathedral in Warsaw. In the evening, he began to complain of pain. The next morning, he felt better and went about his usual work in the metropolitan chancery, after which he went to the hospital, where he was scheduled for hernia surgery. During the preparations for the surgery, he suffered a heart attack and despite immediate medical assistance, he died at the hospital on Brzeska Street in Warsaw. He was buried in the Orthodox cemetery in Warsaw's Wola district.

His cousin was Bishop Pantelejmon Rudyk. Stefan Rudyk was fluent in Ukrainian, Russian, and Romanian.
