= Sawa Hrycuniak =

Eastern Orthodox cleric and Primate of the Polish Orthodox Church

Sawa (Hrycuniak)
- Metropolitan of Warsaw and all Poland; Metropolita warszawski i całej Polski
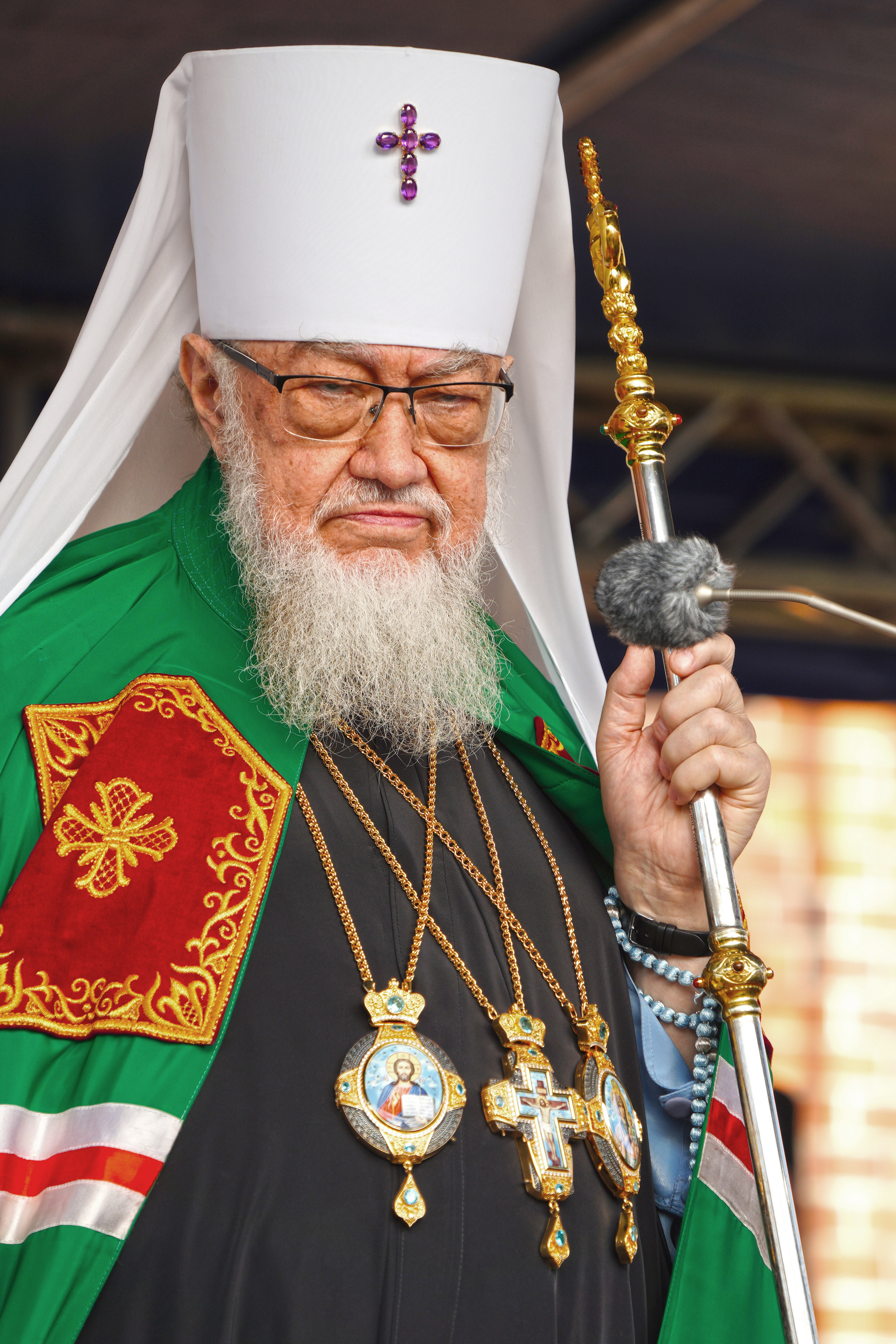
- Metropolitan Sawa in 2022
- Native name: Michał Hrycuniak
- Church: Polish Orthodox Church
- Predecessor: Bazyli Doroszkiewicz

Personal details
- Born: April 14, 1938 (age 88) Śniatycze
- Denomination: Eastern Orthodox Christianity
- Education: Orthodox Theological Seminary in Warsaw; Christian Theological Academy

Metropolitan Sawa, (sometimes anglicised as Sabbas, secular birth name Michał Hrycuniak; born 14 April 1938 in Śniatycze) has been the Archbishop of Warsaw and Metropolitan of All Poland, and hence the primate of the Polish Orthodox Church since 1998, the second largest organized religious body in Poland.

== Biography ==
=== Youth and education ===
He was born on April 15, 1938, in Śniatycze near Tomaszów in a peasant family. After graduating from the Orthodox Theological Seminary in Warsaw in 1957, he enrolled at the Christian Theological Academy in Warsaw. He completed his higher education with a master's degree in theology in 1961, defending his master's thesis on “The Third Missionary Journey of the Apostle Paul” . In the same year, he was ordained a lector and appointed lecturer at the Orthodox Theological Seminary in Warsaw and assistant editor of Cerkiewny Wiestnik. In 1962, he was appointed lecturer in the history of the Universal Church at the Christian Theological Academy.

=== Priesthood ===
On September 27, 1964, he was ordained a deacon by Archbishop Jerzy of Łódź and Poznań. In 1965/1966, he pursued doctoral studies at the Faculty of Orthodox Theology at the University of Belgrade (Yugoslavia). On February 2, 1966, he defended his doctoral thesis on “The Life and Work of St. John the Baptist.” Four days later, at the Monastery of the Presentation of the Most Holy Mother of God, he took his monastic vows before Serbian Patriarch Herman, receiving the name Sava, in memory of Sava, the first Archbishop of Serbia (1169-1236). After returning to his country, on March 6, 1966, he was ordained a priest by Stefan, Metropolitan of Warsaw and All Poland.

On July 1, 1966, he was appointed acting director of the Office of the Metropolitan of Warsaw and All Poland, and on September 25, 1967, he became director of that office. On March 11, 1969, on the occasion of Christ's Passover, he received the title of igumen. During this period, until 1970, he also served vacant parishes in south-eastern Poland, including Pielgrzymka and Zapałów. On January 29, 1970, he was dismissed from the position of director of the metropolitan office. On February 8 of the same year, he was elevated to the rank of archimandrite, and on February 16, he was appointed superior of the St. Onuphrius Monastery in Jabłeczna. On September 12, 1974, Archimandrite Sawa was appointed rector of the Higher Orthodox Theological Seminary in Jabłeczna, and in 1977 he resumed his work at the Christian Theological Academy in Warsaw. On May 16, 1978, he defended his habilitation thesis on “The Concept of Marriage in Orthodox Theology” at the same university. On October 1, 1979, the Minister of Science, Higher Education, and Technology awarded him the title of associate professor.

On November 24, 1979, he was dismissed from his position as superior of the Monastery of St. Onuphrius in Jabłeczna and rector of the Higher Orthodox Theological Seminary. The following day, his chirotonia with the title of Bishop of Łódź took place at St. Mary Magdalene Cathedral in Warsaw. The ceremony was presided over by Metropolitan Basil of Warsaw and All Poland, Archbishop Nikanor of Białystok and Gdańsk, and Bishop Alexy of Wrocław and Szczecin. On December 1, 1979, he was appointed Bishop of Łódź and Poznań. On August 1, 1981, he was transferred to the cathedral of the Bishop of Białystok and Gdańsk. On April 18, 1987, he was elevated to the rank of archbishop. From May 16, 1994, to October 21, 1998, he also held the position of Orthodox Ordinary of the Polish Army (from May 3, 1996, with the rank of brigadier general).

In 1979, Metropolitan Sawa became head of the Department of Dogmatic and Moral Theology and the Orthodox Theology Section of the Christian Theological Academy in Warsaw. From 1984 to 1990, he served as vice-rector of the academy. On November 17, 1990, the President of Poland awarded him the academic title of professor of theological sciences. He was also the initiator of the establishment of the Department of Orthodox Theology at the University of Białystok on March 5, 1999, and its first head.

=== Metropolitan of Warsaw and all of Poland ===
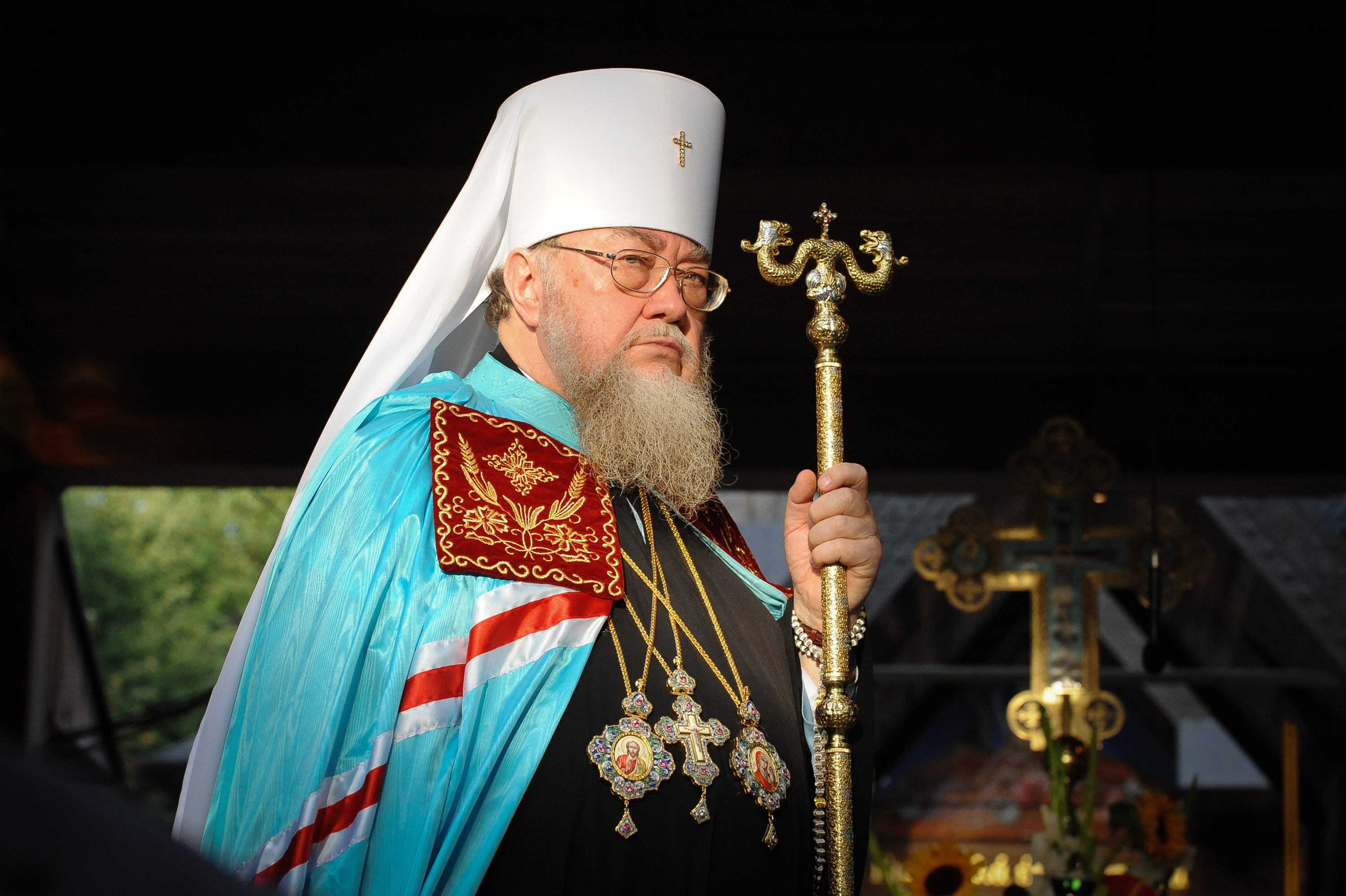
Metropolitan Sawa

After the death of Metropolitan Basil, he served as Locum Tenens of the Metropolitan See from January 1998. On May 12 of that year, the Holy Synod of Bishops of the Polish Autocephalous Orthodox Church elected him as the new Metropolitan of Warsaw and All Poland. In this capacity, Metropolitan Sawa made official pastoral visits to most of the Local Orthodox Churches (the Patriarchate of Constantinople, the Patriarchate of Alexandria, the Patriarchate of Jerusalem, the Patriarchate of Moscow, the Patriarchate of Serbia, the Patriarchate of Georgia, the Patriarchate of Romania, the Patriarchate of Bulgaria, the Greek Orthodox Church, the Orthodox Church in America, and the Orthodox Church in Finland). He also met with the leaders of most of the Local Orthodox Churches (Patriarch Bartholomew of Constantinople, Patriarch Peter VII of Alexandria, Patriarch Pavle of Serbia, Patriarch Teoctist of Romania, Archbishop Christodoulos of All Greece, Archbishop Anastasios of All Albania, Metropolitan Herman of America and All Canada). During this period, he twice participated in the Pan-Orthodox Council in Sofia (1998) and in the celebrations of the 2000th anniversary of Christianity (Holy Land, Constantinople).

For his scientific work, Metropolitan Sava received honorary doctorates from St. Vladimir's Theological Seminary in New York (2000), the University of Białystok (2001), Aristotle University of Thessaloniki (2002), and Minsk Theological Academy (2002). Metropolitan Sava was a member of the Faith and Order Commission of the World Council of Churches and the Orthodox-Roman Catholic Theological Commission. He participated in many national and international conferences. For his active and comprehensive work, he was honored with a number of church and state decorations, including the Commander's Cross of the Order of Polonia Restituta. His Eminence's academic achievements include over 100 publications, 12 doctoral students, over 100 master's students, reviews of 5 postdoctoral dissertations, and 17 doctoral dissertations.

In his service to the church, His Eminence Metropolitan Sawa strives to maintain unity and stability. He places particular emphasis on the development of theological education and the deepening of religious awareness among children, young people, and all the faithful. Thanks to his efforts, in 1992 the relics of St. Gabriel, a young martyr, were brought to Poland, and in 2003 the Holy Martyrs of Chełm and Podlasie were canonized. He is known as the renovator of monastic life in Poland, the initiator and builder of many Orthodox churches, as well as the initiator of monastic conferences and meetings of nuns.

=== Controversies ===
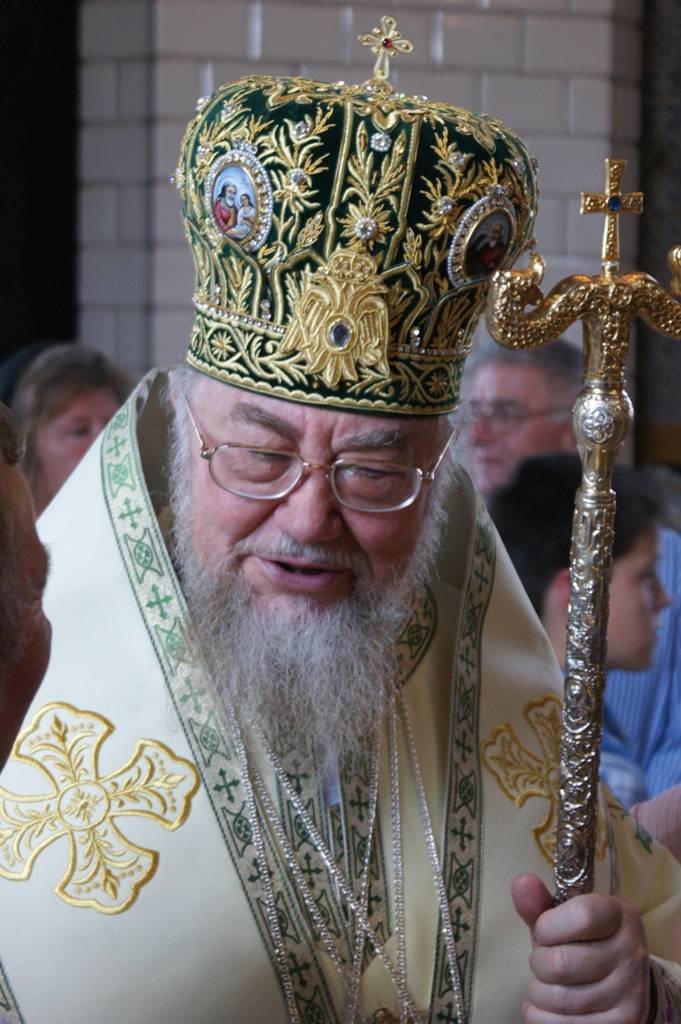
Metropolitan Sawa in 2010.

Based on documents, Sawa was accused by some Polish historians of being a longtime associate of the communist Służba Bezpieczeństwa as early as mid 1960s in connection with operation "Byzantium" (Bizancjum), actively working under name of TW Jurek, during which he cooperated with communist authorities, leading a coordinated campaign against individual church members and the Orthodox church itself. He supported and worked with communist government for the purpose of advancing his career within the church. However he denied those accusations.

Eastern Orthodox Church titles
Preceded by Bazyli Doroszkiewicz	Metropolitan of Poland; 1998–present	Incumbent
Preceded by Nikanor (Niesłuchowski)	Bishop of Białystok and Gdańsk; 1981–1998	Succeeded by Jakub (Kostiuczuk)
Preceded by Jerzy (Korenistow)	Bishop of Łódź and Poznań; 1979–1981	Succeeded by Szymon (Romańczuk)
