= George Korenistov =

Former Polish Eastern Orthodox cleric

Jerzy (Korenistow)
- Archbishop of Łódź and Poznań
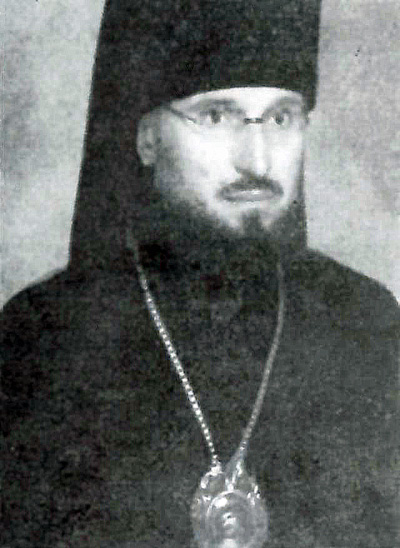
- Church: Polish Orthodox Church
- Elected: 1958
- Quashed: 1979
- Predecessor: Sawa (Hrycuniak)
- Successor: Atanazy (Nos)

Orders
- Ordination: 1924

Personal details
- Born: March 14, 1900 Tsarskoye Selo
- Died: November 16, 1979 (aged 79) Łódź

Archbishop George, (Russian: Архиепископ Георгий, Polish: Arcybiskup Jerzy, secular name Aleksey Vasilyevich Korenistov, Russian: Алексей Васильевич Коренистов, Polish: Aleksy Wasiliewicz Korenistow; 14 March 1900 – 16 November 1979) was the first Archbishop of Łódź and Poznań (Polish Orthodox Church).

== Youth and education ==
He was born in the family of merchant Vasily Korenistov and Zinaida (née Balukova). After the October Revolution, he migrated to Poland. In the period between January 1 and September 21, 1921, he is recorded in the documentation of the command of Interned Camp No. 15 in Toruń, as a medical assistant working there.

In 1922, Korenistov entered the theological seminary in Vilnius. A year later, he left it to transfer immediately to the 6th grade of the theological seminary in Kremenets, from which he graduated in 1924. On 28 April (or 23 August), 1924 he made his religious vows in the Pochayiv Lavra in front of Aleksandr, the bishop of Pinsk and Polesia. In that monastery he was consecutively ordained deacon and priest on August 24 and August 29 of the same year. In 1930 Korenistov obtained Polish citizenship. He continued his theological education at the College of Orthodox Theology at the University of Warsaw, receiving a master's degree in theological sciences in 1931. He was an outstanding student there.

== Early activity ==
In the years 1931–1932 he was successively pastor of the parishes in Radom and Kielce. He ran these parishes at a time when both lost their existing churches, rediscovered to the Catholic Church. He held services most often in private homes. Then, in 1933, he was transferred to the parish of St. Jerzy in Lviv, where he worked for less than a year. He was appointed the superior of the Zhyrovichy Monastery in the Diocese of Grodno, which he held until November 1935. In the period 1935–1938 he was a parish priest and dean in Łuniniec in Polesie, and for the next four years - a member of the Consistory in Pinsk.

== Bishop ==
On February 8, 1942, he chirotone the Bishop of Brest, vicar of the Pinsk diocese of the non-canon Ukrainian Autocephalous Orthodox Church. Initially, however, he did not perform his duties, which, according to Archbishop Szymon, is proof that he recognized the non-canonicity of the structure to which he was included. The UAKP metropolitans Aleksandr and Polikarp the following year clearly reprimanded him in letters for such an attitude, suggesting that he might be deprived of his dignity. Most likely, under the influence of these pressures, at the end of 1943, Bishop Jerzy finally succumbed and settled in Brest, which he had avoided so far, and began to exercise his bishop's duties. He left the city in 1944 shortly before the Red Army entered the area. He then went to Warsaw. On December 31, 1946, he was appointed the temporary head of the Orthodox Administration in the Recovered Territories.

On May 27, 1947, the metropolitan of Warsaw and all of Poland, Dionizy, sent him to the parish of St. Alexander Nevsky in Łódź as the parish priest. His episcopal ordination was questioned due to doubts about the circumstances of the establishment of the UAKP; they were finally recognized only on 31 December 1947. Then, on April 26, 1948, he was incorporated into the temporary Governing College of the Polish Orthodox Church under the leadership of Archbishop Timothy.

In June 1948, together with the other members of the College (priest Jan Kowalenko, priest Eugeniusz Naumow, priest Wsiewołod Łopuchowicz, Mikołaj Sieriebriannikow and Archbishop Timothy) he went to Moscow, where Patriarch Alexei I was to reunite the Orthodox Church in Poland with the Russian Church, and then grant it a second autocephaly (the first, given by the Constantinople Patriarchate, was not accepted by the Russian Orthodox Church). As Bishop Jerzy recalled, the participants of the delegation feared that they would be transported directly from the capital of the USSR to labor camps. Ultimately, however, nothing of the sort happened, and Bishop Jerzy established friendly relations with Patriarch Alexius I, with whom he then corresponded.

From November 12, 1948, he headed the Łódź-Wrocław diocese, and after the reorganization of the administrative division of the Polish Autocephalous Orthodox Church on January 31, 1951, he became the first head of the newly established Łódź-Poznań diocese. On 9 April 1958 he was elevated to the dignity of the Archbishop of Łódź and Poznań. He performed this function until the end of his life. The hierarchy maintained close contacts with the Russian community living in Łódź, in which he enjoyed considerable respect. According to the recollections of the Russian inhabitants of Łódź, he lived very modestly; he was interested in classical music.

== Locum tenens of the Warsaw metropolis ==
After the death of Metropolitan Timothy, from 24 May 1962 to 25 May 1965, he was the locum tenens of the Warsaw metropolis. The authorities of the Polish People's Republic, openly interfering with the life of the PAKP, prevented the election of a new head of the Church during this period. In the publications of the Commonwealth, there was a thesis that the election of Archbishop Jerzy to be the metropolitan of Warsaw and the whole of Poland was blocked by the Security Service According to a journalist of the Republic of Poland, Cezary Gmyz, the archbishop was considered an unsuitable candidate because of his willingness to maintain good relations with the Catholic Church, which was interpreted as "a desire to play the role of the Orthodox Wyszyński", and because of his opposition to the control of the Office for Religious Affairs over the PAKP. Ryszard Michalak, on the other hand, writes that Archbishop Jerzy did not become a metropolitan, because he tried not to let the Office for Denominations set the directions of the current policy of the Church. Contrary to his recommendations, he intended to maintain good contacts with the Roman Catholic Church, and to be cool about the Polish Ecumenical Council. Moreover, the Ministry of the Interior negatively assessed Jerzy's maintaining private contacts with Roman Catholic bishops.

The council of bishops that would elect a new superior was for two years prevented by the authorities that did not grant permission to carry out the episcopal chirotony of the fourth hierarch and thus obtain the canonically required number of bishops in an autocephalous Church. It was only in 1964 that the authorities allowed the fourth bishop to be ordained - Fr. Mikołaj Niesłuchowski, who took the religious name of Nikanor. In 1965 the council of bishops elected archbishop Stefan as the new head of the PAKP. Only his authorities of the People's Republic of Poland were willing to accept the metropolitan of Warsaw and all Poland

Archbishop Jerzy again performed the duties of locum tenens after the death of Metropolitan Stefan, in the period between 29 March 1969 and 24 January 1970. Again, according to the publication of Rzeczpospolita, the authorities of the People's Republic of Poland were to prevent him from being elected the head of the Church; Metropolitan Stefan was succeeded by the bishop of Wrocław and Szczecin, Bazyli.

Jerzy Korenistow died on 16 November 1979 in a hospital in Łódź and was buried at the Łódź Orthodox Cemetery in Doły, near the Dormition of the Mother of God cemetery church. He was the last hierarch of the Orthodox Church in Poland of Russian origin.

Eastern Orthodox Church titles
New title	Archbishop of Łódź and Poznań; 1951–1979	Succeeded by Sawa (Hrycuniak)
