= Nikanor Niesłuchowski =

Former Polish Eastern Orthodox cleric

Nikanor (Niesłuchowski)
- Archbishop of Białystok and Gdańsk
- Church: Polish Orthodox Church
- Elected: 1966
- Quashed: 1981
- Predecessor: Stefan (Rudyk)
- Successor: Sawa (Hrycuniak)

Personal details
- Born: March 8, 1909 Ravaniche, Belarus
- Died: February 19, 1985 Białystok

Archbishop Nikanor, (secular birth name Mikołaj Niesłuchowski; 8 March 1909 – 19 February 1985) was the Archbishop of Białystok and Gdańsk.

== Life ==
He was born on 8 March 1909 in the village of Rowanicze in Belarus in the family of a psalmist. He graduated from primary school in Ostrówki in the Nesvizh poviat, where he arrived with his parents in 1912.

In 1930 he graduated from the Theological Seminary in Vilnius. In 1934, he graduated from the Orthodox Theology Department of the University of Warsaw with a master's degree in Orthodox Theology.

He was ordained a priest as a white (married) clergyman. Widowed in 1944, when his wife Olga died during the Soviet-German fights for the village of Jaczno in the Białystok region. The clergyman himself was then injured.

On December 9, 1952, the metropolitan of Warsaw and all of Poland, Makary, presented to the council of bishops of the Polish Autocephalous Orthodox Church three candidates for clergy to accept bishop chirotony and take over the cathedral in Wrocław and Szczecin: Mikołaj Niesłuchowski, Jan Lewiarz and Archimandrite Stefan (Rudyk). From the presented proposals, the bishops chose Archimandrite Stefan.

In 1953 he was one of the members of the PAKP delegation at the restitution ceremony of the Bulgarian Patriarchate.

In 1964, while still a white clergyman, he was made a bishop. After making his perpetual monastic vows, during which he took the monastic name of Nikanor, he became auxiliary bishop of the Warsaw-Bielsko diocese with the title of the bishop of Lublin. He remained so from 1965 to 1966. He took over the Białystok-Gdańsk cathedral in 1966, when the former Białystok bishop, Stefan, became the metropolitan of Warsaw and of all Poland after the death of Metropolitan Timothy.

By the decision of the Holy Council of Bishops in 1966, he was appointed the Ordinary of the Białystok-Gdańsk diocese. Ingres to the Białystok cathedral took place on May 8, 1966. In 1978 he was given the office of archbishop, and two years later he was given the right to wear a diamond cross on a headgear.

As an ordinary of the diocese of Białystok and Gdańsk, he unsuccessfully sought permission from the authorities to build a new Orthodox temple in Białystok, stressing that the existing churches were not sufficient to provide full pastoral care for the faithful. However, he only obtained permission to build a new Orthodox temple on a plot of land near the church of St. Mary Magdalene in Białystok. He refused to accept it, claiming that the existence of two sacred buildings in close proximity was pointless. He carried out a major renovation of the Cathedral of St. Nicholas in Białystok, and in 1979 he consecrated the new Orthodox Church of the Dormition of the Blessed Virgin Mary in Białystok-Starosielce

He personally conducted catechesis for children in the building of the All Saints parish in Białystok, where he also lived, he also initiated separate Holy Liturgies addressed in a special way to children.

He took part in the peace movement. He appeared at conferences on the participation of the Orthodox in the peace movement in Bulgaria, the USSR and Romania.

On 18 July 1981 he retired. He died four years later in Białystok and was buried in the parish cemetery of the All Saints parish.

He was registered as a secret collaborator of the SB with the pseudonym "Magister".

Eastern Orthodox Church titles
Preceded by Stefan (Rudyk)	Bishop of Białystok and Gdańsk; 1966-1978	Succeeded by Sawa (Hrycuniak)
New title	Archbishop of Białystok and Gdańsk; 1978–1981	Vacant
