= Alexander Nevsky Cathedral, Łódź =

Coordinates: 51°46′14.54″N 19°27′51.7″E

Alexander Nevsky Cathedral
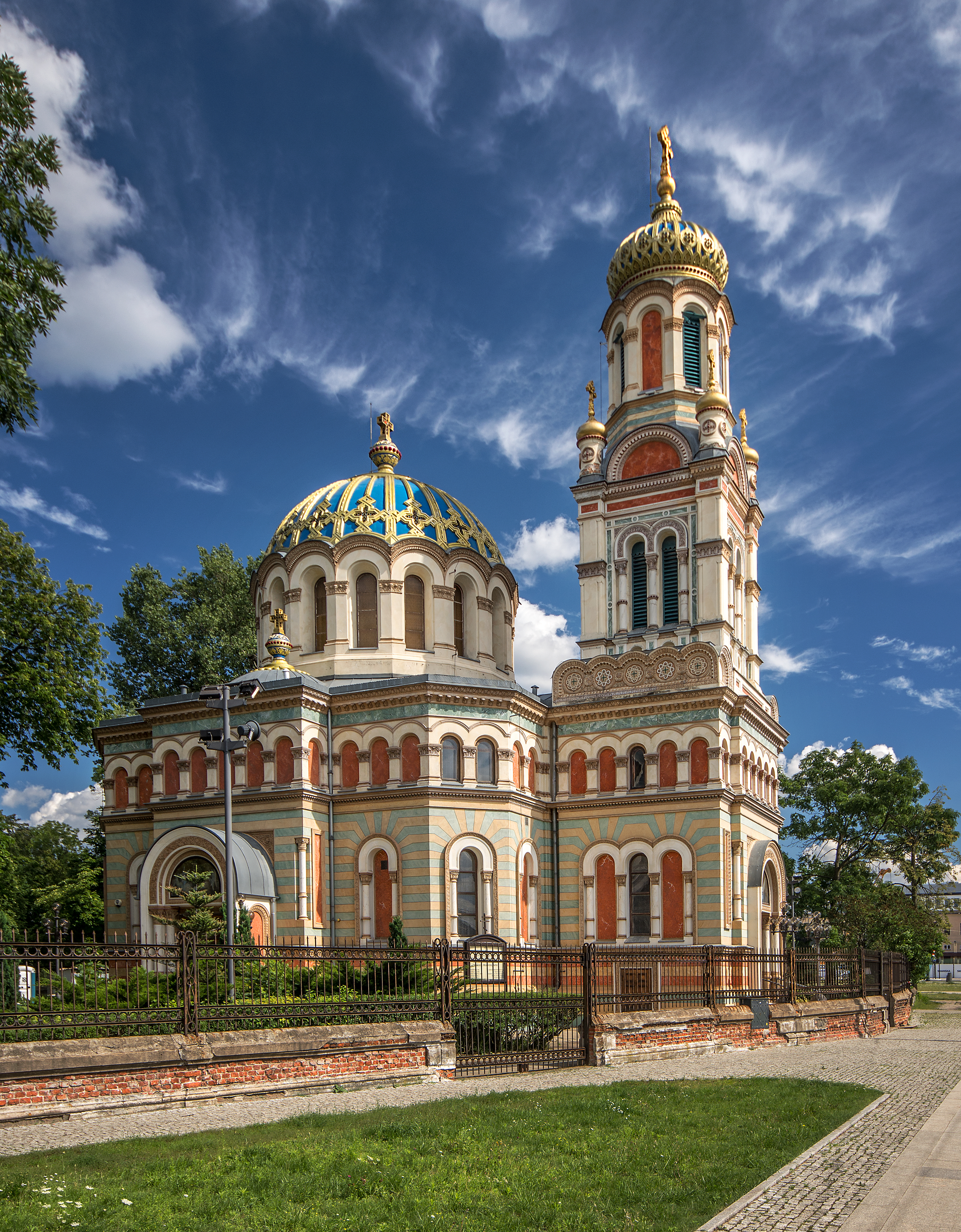
- The cathedral in 2017
- Alexander Nevsky Cathedral
- Location: Łódź
- Country: Poland
- Denomination: Polish Orthodox Church

History
- Consecrated: 29 May 1884

The Alexander Nevsky Cathedral (Polish: Sobór św. Aleksandra Newskiego w Łodzi; Russian: Александро-Невский собор) is a Polish Orthodox church located in the city of Łódź, in central Poland. It was built in the late 19th century as a gift from the local industrialists to the small Orthodox community present in Łódź at the time. The church consists of many ornate elevations and has a richly decorated interior featuring an iconostasis manufactured in St. Petersburg.

== History ==
The church was built during the period when Poland lost its independence and was divided between the German, Austro-Hungarian and Russian Empires. It was constructed in the Russian sector (Congress Poland) with the financial support from the local textile factory owners and the most prominent citizens who adhered to Judaism, Protestantism and Catholicism. The church was consecrated on 29 May 1884 by Archbishop Leontius the ordinary of Warsaw and Chełm Dioceses.

The orthodox church was designed and built in the Neo-Byzantine style in an octagonal shape. Stained glass windows and iconostasis, made from oak wood, with three doors are the main decorations of the church. Izrael Poznański, who financed the enclosure and fence around the church was also the founder of the iconostasis.

The building is located at 56 Jana Kilińskiego Street in Łódź, near Stanisław Moniuszko Park and Łódź Fabryczna railway station.

== Gallery ==
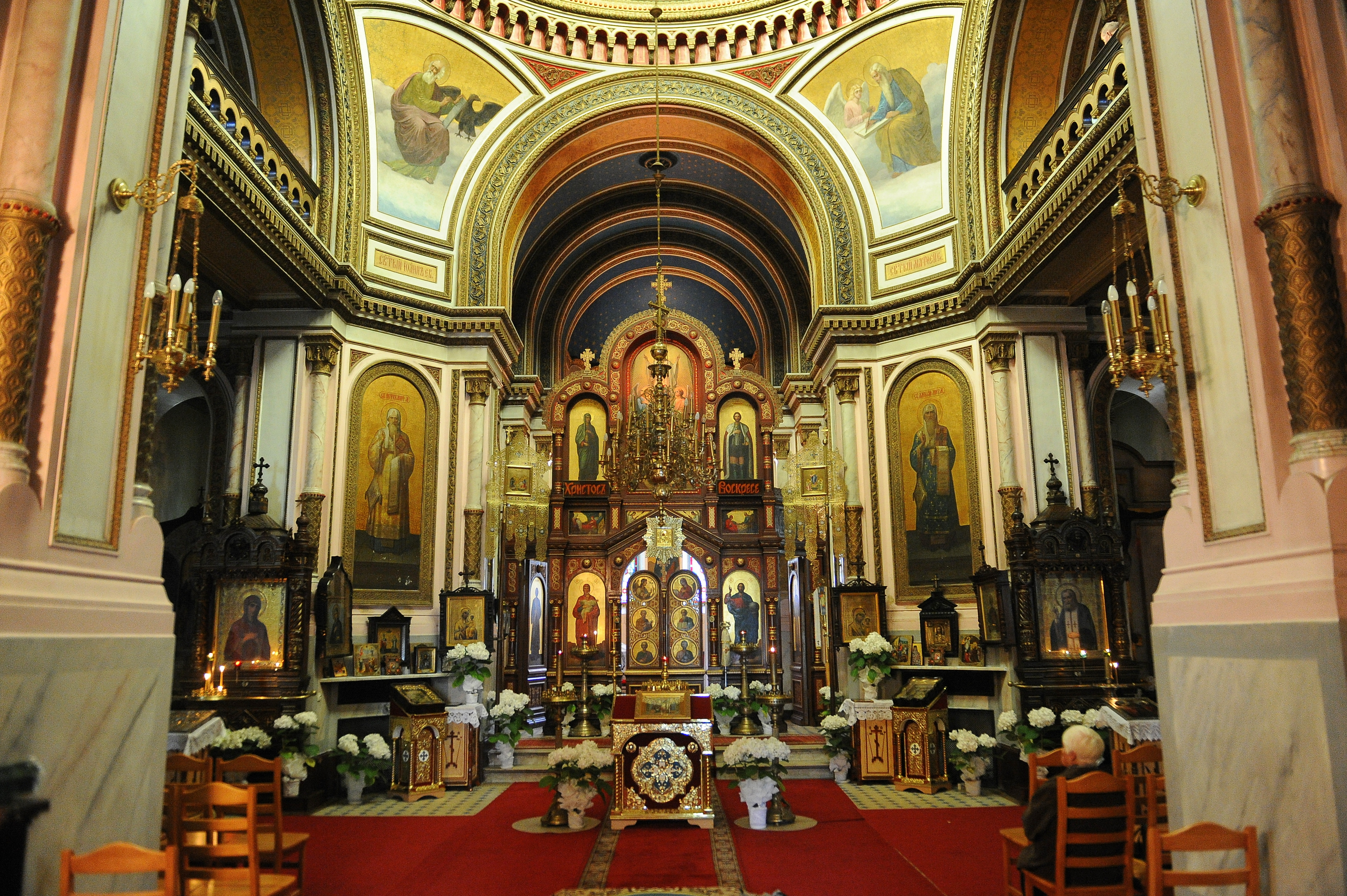
Interior
