= Śniatycze =

- Village
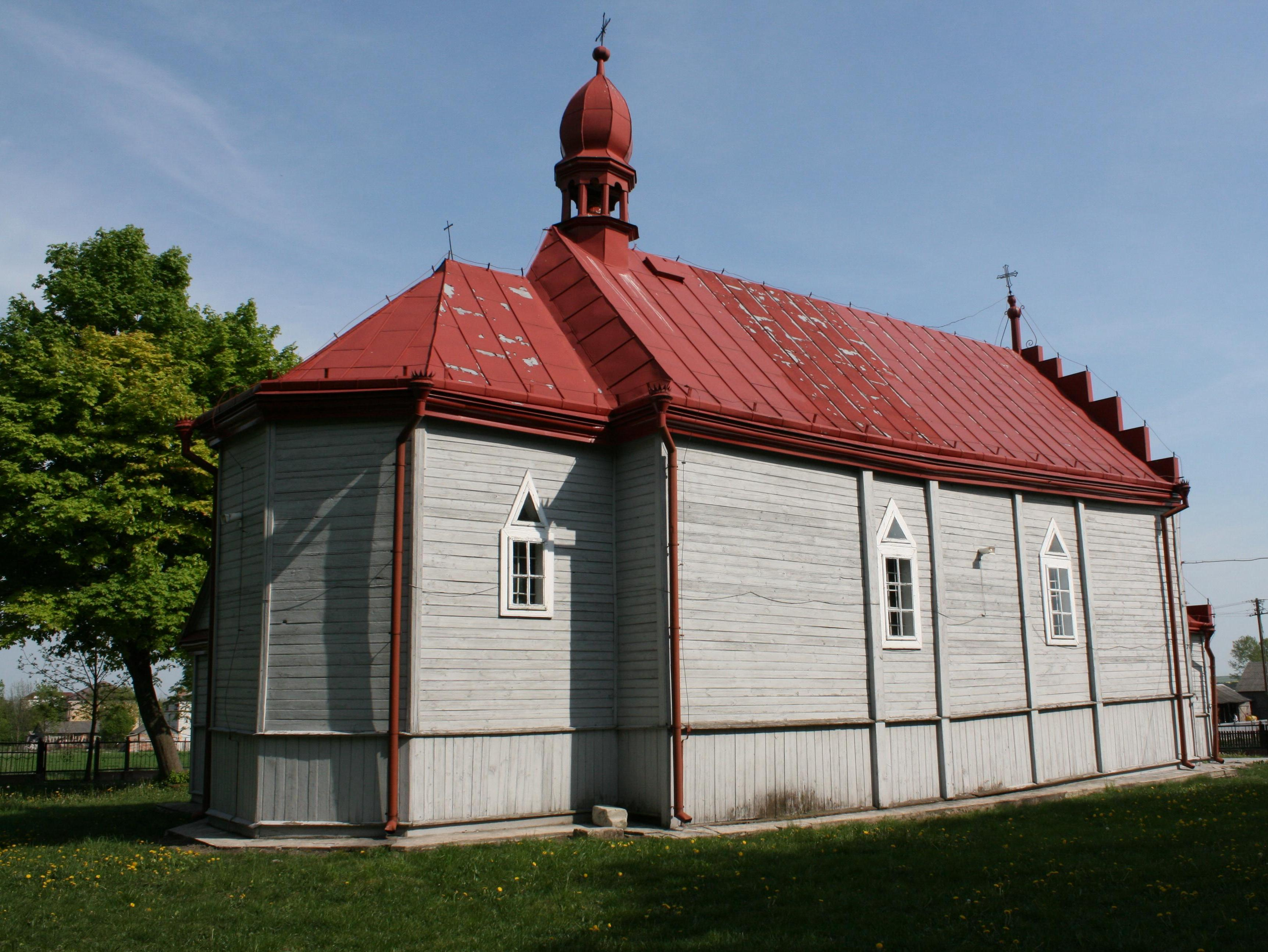
- Śniatycze's former Greek Catholic church, now Roman Catholic
- Interactive map of Śniatycze
- Location within Poland
- Coordinates: 50°39′N 23°32′E
- Country: Poland
- Voivodeship: Lublin
- County: Zamość
- Gmina: Komarów-Osada
- Population: 240
- Post code: 22-435

Śniatycze [ɕɲaˈtɨt͡ʂɛ] is a village in the administrative district of Gmina Komarów-Osada, within Zamość County, Lublin Voivodeship, in eastern Poland.
