= Timothy Szretter =

Polish Orthodox clergyman, the third Metropolitan of Warsaw and all Poland

His Eminence Timothy
- Metropolitan of Warsaw and all Poland
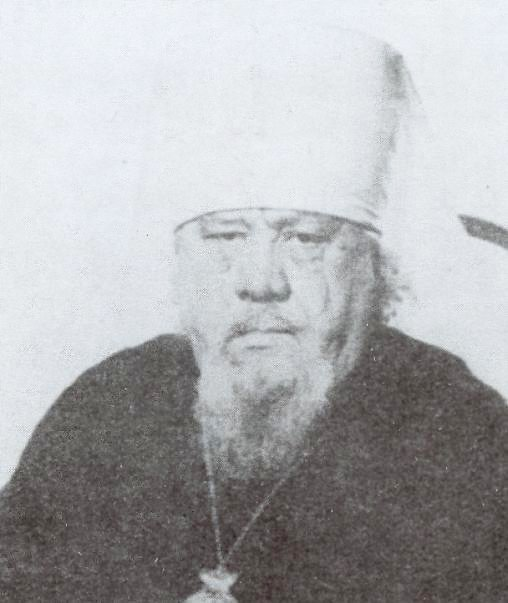
- Church: Polish Orthodox Church
- In office: 1961–1962
- Predecessor: Macarius Oksiyuk
- Successor: George Korenistov

Orders
- Ordination: 1938
- Consecration: 27 November 1938 by Dionysius Waledyński

Personal details
- Born: Jerzy Szretter; May 16, 1901 Tomachów near Rivne
- Died: May 20, 1962 (aged 61) Warsaw
- Buried: Orthodox Cemetery, Warsaw
- Denomination: Eastern Orthodoxy

Timothy, secular name Jerzy Szretter (born May 16, 1901, in Tomachów near Rivne, died May 20, 1962, in Warsaw) was a Polish Orthodox clergyman, the third Metropolitan of Warsaw and all Poland.

After graduating from the Orthodox Theological Seminary in Warsaw and ordination to the priesthood, he served in the Volhynian diocese and was a chaplain for Orthodox soldiers in the Polish army. In 1938, he was consecrated as a bishop. During World War II, due to his strong support for the Polonization of the Polish Orthodox Church, expressed during the Second Polish Republic, he stayed in the Monastery of St. Onuphrius in Jabłeczna, without influencing the direction of the church's development. Between 1948 and 1951, and again between December 1959 and May 1961, he temporarily administered the Polish Orthodox Church, which was without a leader at that time. In 1961, he was elected Metropolitan of Warsaw and all Poland with overt support from Polish state authorities, and in violation of the procedures outlined in the Church's Internal Statute, which led to protests from clergy and believers. He died after one year of holding the position.

== Early life ==
He completed high school in Ostroh. From 1925 to 1930, he studied at the Orthodox Theological Seminary of the University of Warsaw. On 11 August 1930, he was ordained to the priesthood at the Pochaiv Lavra and was assigned to the parish in Łanowiec.

In December 1933, he was transferred from the pospolite ruszenie to the reserve of military clergy, simultaneously appointed as a reserve chaplain with seniority from 1 January 1934, and ranked 6th among Orthodox military clergy. Subsequently, as a reserve chaplain, he was called to active duty and appointed as the acting dean of the Orthodox district of Corps District No. II in Lublin.

In 1938, after the death of his wife Lidia, he took religious vows.

=== Bishop ===
On 27 November 1938, at the Pochaiv Lavra, he received episcopal consecration from the hands of Dionysius Waledyński, Metropolitan of Warsaw and all Poland. He was appointed as the vicar of the Diocese of Warsaw and Chełm with the title of Bishop of Lublin. According to Antoni Mironowicz, his consecration took place under pressure from the Polish state authorities, who aimed to Polonize the Polish Orthodox Church, while the majority of the hierarchy and clergy in the church's structures were Russians, Ukrainians, and Belarusians. However, Jerzy Szretter was positively inclined towards the plans for Polonization of the Orthodox structures in Poland. He undertook activities in this direction within the Diocese of Warsaw and Chełm after his consecration as bishop. Alongside Bishop Matthew Siemaszko and Bishop Sawa Sovietov, he was one of the greatest proponents of Polonization within the clergy of the Polish Orthodox Church.

=== World War II ===
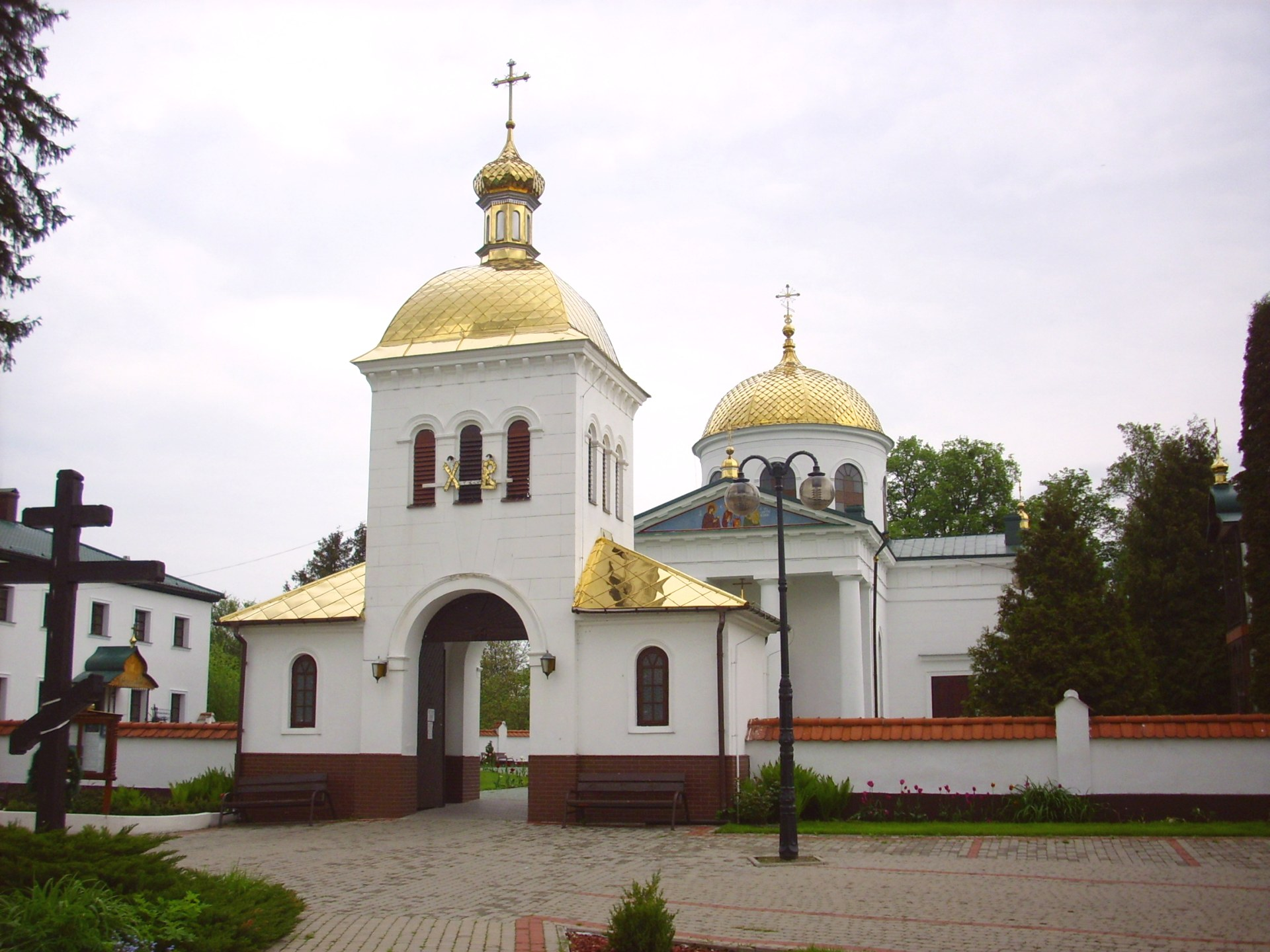
St. Onuphrius Monastery in Jabłeczna. Bishop Timothy resided there for almost the entire duration of World War II.

After the outbreak of World War II, he arrived from the St. Onuphrius Monastery in Jabłeczna, where he had resided, to Warsaw. However, the ruling hierarch of the Diocese of Warsaw and Chełm since November 1939, Metropolitan Seraphim Lade of Berlin and Germany, sent him back to the monastery due to his pro-Polish views. Bishop Timothy returned to active church activities on 30 September 1940, as a member of the council of bishops of the General Government Orthodox Church (the establishment of such a structure was announced by Metropolitan Dionysius at the end of September of the same year). On the same day, he was granted the title of auxiliary bishop of the Diocese of Chełm and Podlachia. After the formation of the Church Synod, Bishop Timothy did not join its ranks due to his pre-war pro-Polish stance, which was inconsistent with the policy of Ukrainization of the Polish Orthodox Church. On 10 August 1944, the chairman of the Polish Committee of National Liberation, Edward Osóbka-Morawski, agreed to his temporary administration of the Diocese of Chełm and Podlachia. During his supervision of the aforementioned administration, the deportation of Ukrainians to the USSR took place, leading to the closure of over 160 pastoral facilities due to lack of parishioners. Timothy (Szretter) did not protest against this; in a formal letter at the turn of 1944 and 1945, he stated that leaving the parishes in Lublin, Chełm, Biała Podlaska, Hrubieszów, and Włodawa in his area of responsibility would be sufficient. He also requested not to liquidate the monastery in Jabłeczna.

In October of the same year, Bishop Timothy also took over the administration of Orthodox parishes in the Białystok region. As a temporary head of the Orthodox Church structures in this region, contrary to the wishes of the local parish clergy, he opposed their transfer to the jurisdiction of the Russian Orthodox Church.

=== After World War II ===
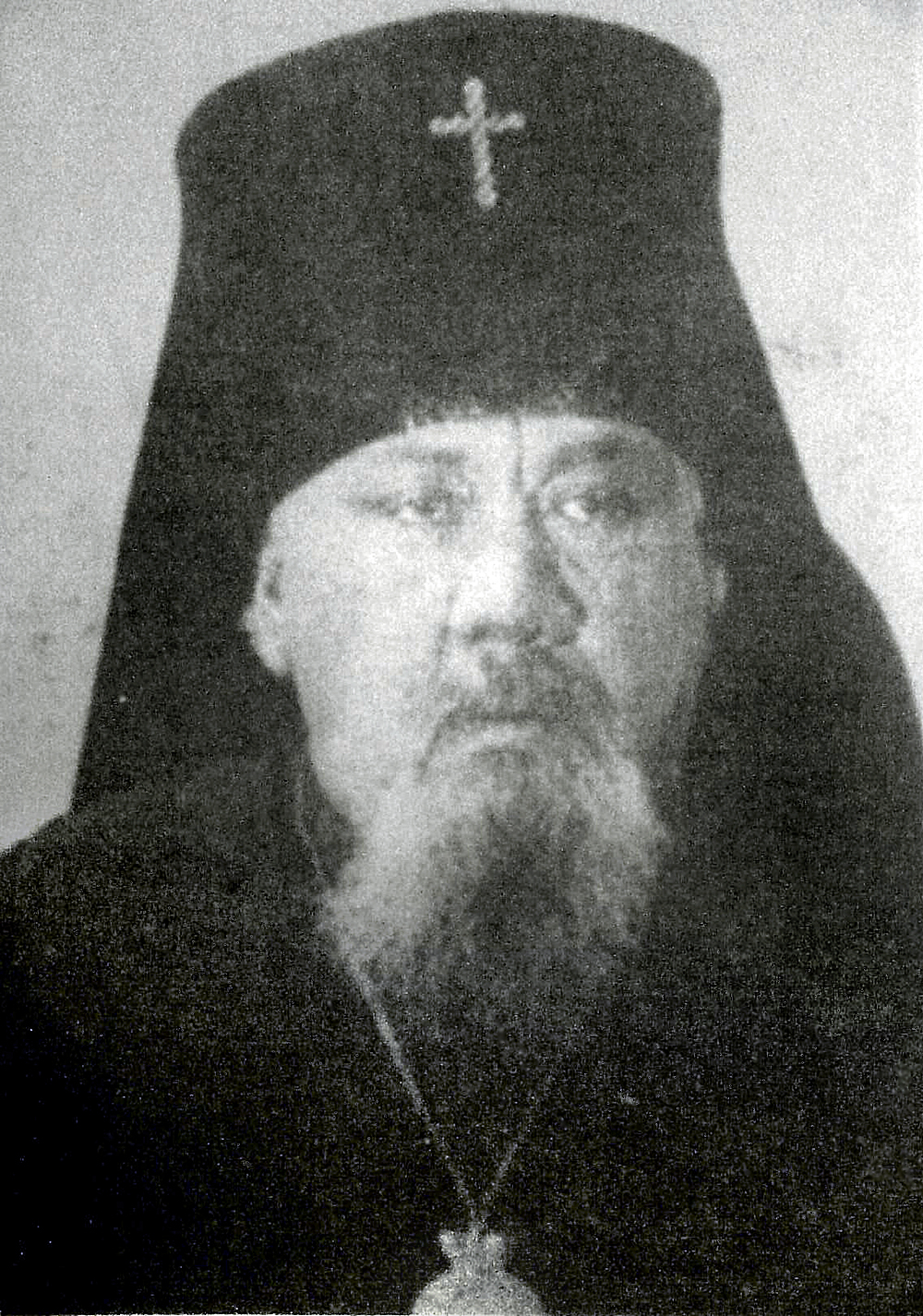
Archbishop Timothy (Szretter), photograph from 1960

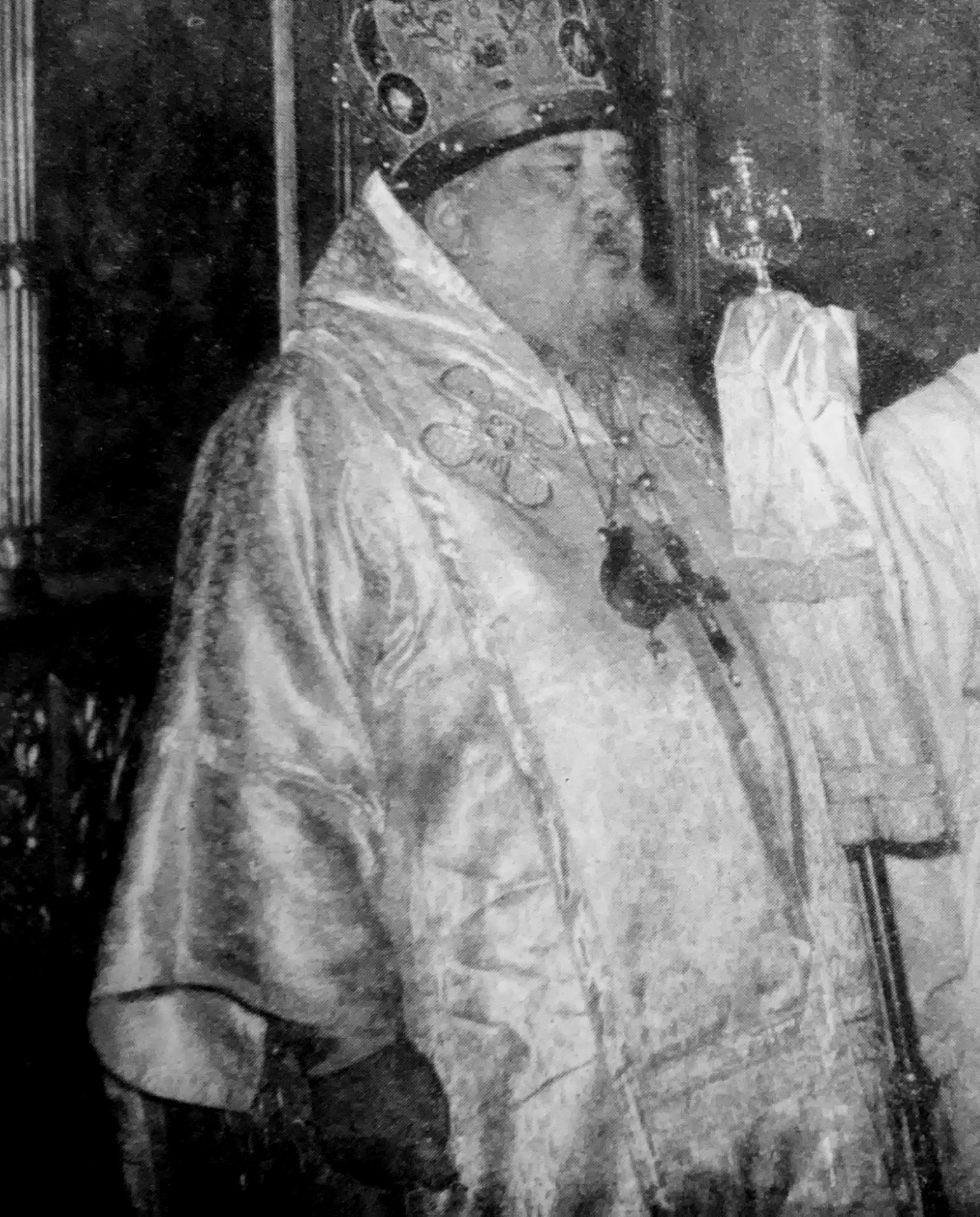
Timothy as Metropolitan of Warsaw and all Poland; speaking at the funeral of Metropolitan Macarius in March 1961.

In 1946, the Department of Denominations of the Ministry of Public Administration began to suggest to Dionysius, Metropolitan of Warsaw and all Poland, to resign from his office (ultimately, the clergyman was forced to do so). Bishop Timothy was considered as his possible successor. On 14 October 1945, he became one of the vice-presidents of the Polish Ecumenical Council.

From 1946, as an archbishop, he led the Białystok-Bielsko diocese, renamed on 7 September 1951, to the Diocese of Białystok and Gdańsk. In 1947, he became the vice-chairman of the Orthodox Metropolitan Committee for Aid to Resettlers in the Recovered Territories, where he engaged in organizing pastoral care and material support for Orthodox Christians who were resettled in these regions of Poland. In the same year, he founded the first female monastery within the post-war borders of Poland – the monastery on Grabarka Holy Mount. In 1948, together with Metropolitan Dionysius, he developed a project for reforming the church's administrative division, which never came into force.

In 1948, the communist authorities finally decided to remove Metropolitan Dionysius from office. Until a new primate of the Polish Orthodox Church was elected, the church was to be governed by a body not provided for by Orthodox canonical law – the Temporary Governing Collegium of the Polish Orthodox Church, consisting of Archbishop Timothy (Szretter) as chairman, Bishop George Korenistov, priest Jan Kowalenko, priest Eugeniusz Naumow, priest Wsiewołod Łopuchowicz, priest Michael Kiedrov, and Mikołaj Sieriebriannikow. On November 12, Archbishop Timothy officially served as the locum tenens of the Warsaw metropolitans. Earlier, in April of the same year, he initiated talks with Patriarch Alexy I of Moscow to clarify the controversies surrounding the canonical status of the Polish Orthodox Church, and on 21 May 1948, he became the temporary administrator of the Recovered Territories diocese, a position he held until September of the same year. In June 1948, he was one of the delegates of the Polish Orthodox Church to the Moscow Patriarchate. The delegation renounced the autocephaly granted by the Patriarchate of Constantinople and applied for its re-issuance by the Russian Orthodox Church, after which they accepted the relevant tomos from the patriarch.

At the request of Archbishop Timothy on 30 June 1948, the Polish authorities prohibited Metropolitan Dionysius from continuing to reside in the metropolitan house in Warsaw and began preparations to designate another permanent place of residence for him.

Archbishop Timothy, like the other bishops of the Polish Orthodox Church, maintained a loyal relationship with the state authorities. In 1949, he publicly asserted that there was no room for any form of religious oppression in Poland. However, the existing plan from 1946 for him to assume the office of metropolitan was abandoned. According to the state authorities, the hierarch's authority among the clergy of the Polish Orthodox Church was insufficient. Archbishop Timothy was also accused of lacking organizational talents and necessary experience. Ultimately, Timothy (Szretter) remained the locum tenens of the Warsaw metropolitans until the arrival of Archbishop Macarius Oksiyuk from the USSR, delegated to the Polish Orthodox Church by the Patriarch of Moscow and elected as the head of the Orthodox Church in Poland on 7 July 1951. Earlier, in 1950, he facilitated the opening of the Orthodox Theological School in Warsaw, later transformed by Metropolitan Macarius into a seminary.

After 1956, Archbishop Timothy effectively began to manage the entire church again due to Metropolitan Macarius' advanced age and poor health. In 1957, the Office for Religious Affairs considered the idea of removing Metropolitan Macarius and reinstating Archbishop Timothy as the locum tenens. Timothy was described as an intelligent, tactful individual who understood the situation and was ready to carry out the authorities' orders even when they were not favorable to him (such as in the matter of filling the office of metropolitan). During the same period, Timothy was registered by the Department IV of the XI Public Security Committee as a "confidential contact" under the pseudonym Beard Man (Polish: Brodacz), although due to the destruction of documentation, it is not possible to determine the nature of his collaboration with the services.

==== Metropolitan of Warsaw and all Poland ====
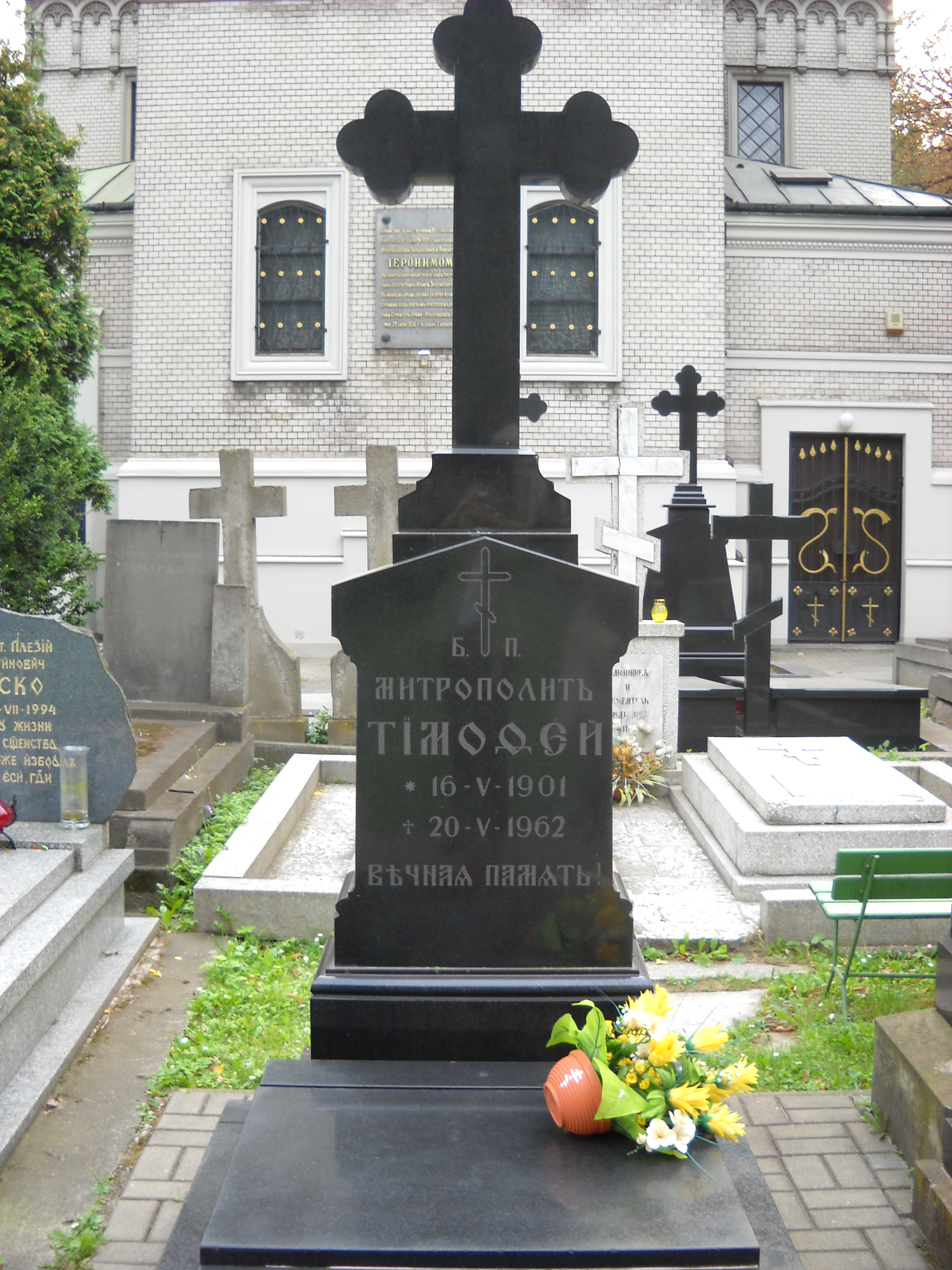
Grave of Metropolitan Timothy

After Macarius' departure to the USSR and his death in Odesa in 1961, the state authorities brought about the election of Timothy as metropolitan (since December 1957, he had been again the locum tenens). Delegations from the Ecumenical Patriarchate of Constantinople and the Romanian Orthodox Church participated in the metropolitan's enthronement. His election was also positively received by the Patriarch of Moscow and all Russia.

Metropolitan Timothy was elected by the Council of Bishops of the Polish Orthodox Church, not by the Electoral Council as stipulated in the church's statute, leading to protests from the clergy and the faithful. The newly elected metropolitan was accused of assuming the office against canonical law. Allegations of moral nature were also raised against him. Petitions and complaints regarding the circumstances of Timothy's assumption of office, as well as his person and conduct, were sent to the State Council of the Polish People's Republic, the Council of Ministers, the Sejm, the Office for Religious Affairs, and the Patriarch of Moscow. One member of the Council of Bishops of the Polish Orthodox Church, Bishop Bazyli Doroszkiewicz, also protested against the electoral process. He claimed that the appointment to the office had been decided by employees of the Office for Religious Affairs, Serafin Kiryłowicz and Adam Wołowicz, who treated the Polish Orthodox Church as a mere object.

As the Metropolitan of Warsaw and all Poland, the hierarch represented the church during the preparations for the pan-Orthodox council. Together with representatives of the Russian Orthodox Church, he engaged in the peace movement. In 1961, he founded a Polish-speaking parish in Warsaw, with Father Jerzy Klinger as its parish priest, but it ceased its activities due to the lack of faithful interested in services in Polish.

Controversies surrounding Metropolitan Timothy persisted throughout his tenure until his death on 20 May 1962. Metropolitan Timothy (Szretter) was buried in the Orthodox Cemetery in Warsaw.

== Bibliography ==
- Mironowicz, Antoni (2001). Kościół prawosławny na ziemiach polskich w XIX i XX wieku. Białystok: Wydawnictwo Uniwersytetu w Białymstoku. ISBN 83-7431-046-4.
- Gerent, Piotr (2007). Prawosławie na Dolnym Śląsku w latach 1945–1989. Toruń: Adam Marszałek. ISBN 978-83-7441-468-5.
- Urban, Kazimierz (1996). Kościół prawosławny w Polsce 1945–1970. Kraków: Nomos. ISBN 83-85527-35-4.
- Dudra, Stefan (2010). Metropolita Dionizy (Waledyński) 1876–1960. Warsaw: Warszawska Metropolia Prawosławna. ISBN 978-83-603-11-34-9.
