= Cathedral of St. Mary Magdalene, Warsaw =

Cathedral of St. Mary Magdalene
- Metropolitan Cathedral of the Holy and Equal-to-the-Apostles Mary Magdalene
- Sobór metropolitalny Świętej Równej Apostołom Marii Magdaleny
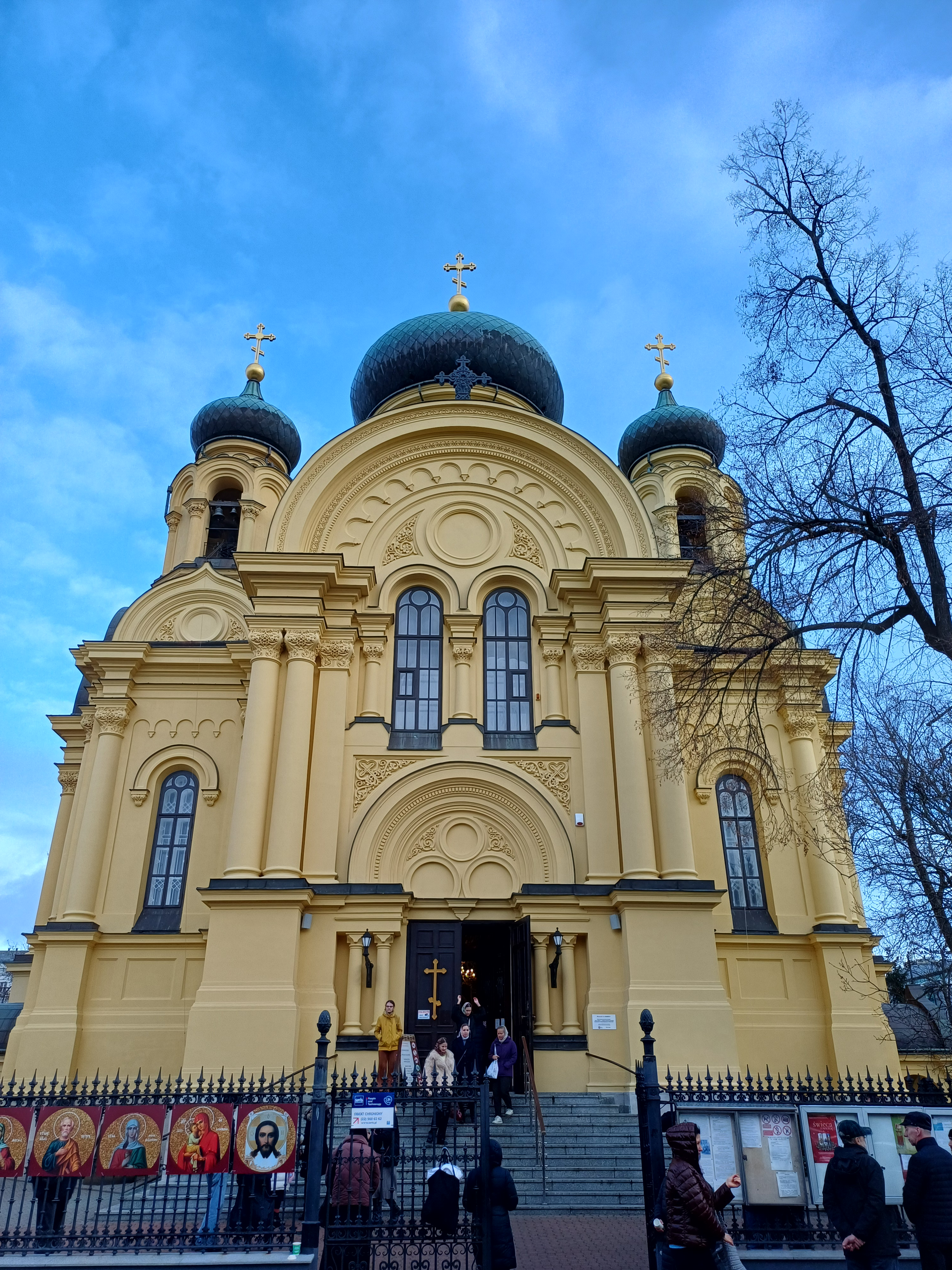
- The Metropolitan Cathedral in Warsaw.
- Cathedral of St. Mary Magdalene
- 52.254808°N 21.033208°E
- Location: Warsaw
- Country: Poland
- Denomination: Eastern Orthodox
- Churchmanship: Polish Orthodox Church
- Website: katedra.org.pl

History
- Status: Cathedral

Architecture
- Functional status: Active
- Architect: Nikolai Sychev
- Style: Russian Revival
- Groundbreaking: 1867
- Completed: 1869

Administration
- Diocese: Warsaw-Bielsk

The Metropolitan Cathedral of the Holy and Equal-to-the-Apostles Mary Magdalene (Polish: Sobór metropolitalny Świętej Równej Apostołom Marii Magdaleny w Warszawie; Russian: Собор Святой Равноапостольной Марии Магдалины) is a Polish Orthodox cathedral, located at al. Solidarności 52 in Warsaw, Poland.

It opened in 1869, serving the needs of a growing community of Russians settling in the area of present-day Praga Północ. During the Second Republic, the cathedral became one of two free-standing Orthodox churches in Warsaw, which were not destroyed or adapted for other purposes.

It is the main Polish Orthodox Church. The cathedral is also the cathedral for the Diocese of Warsaw-Bielsk.

It was entered into the register of monuments on July 1, 1965, with No. 741.

== History ==
=== Background of the need to build the cathedral ===
Serious development of Praga, which took place in the second half of the 19th century, combined with the general development of Warsaw, meant thousands of people settled in the area. The incoming settlers were dominated by Russians and citizens of the eastern area of the Russian occupation, professing Orthodoxy. This was also the professed religion of the soldiers of the two Russian garrisons, which were located in Praga. In total, across the whole of Praga, Orthodoxy constituted ten percent of all residents. This population was forced to use a church located on the other side of the Vistula river, and there were repeated calls for the bishop of Warsaw and Ioannicius (Ioann Semyonovich Gorski - Archbishop of the Russian church) to undertake the construction of a new church. In November 1865, the governor of the Polish Kingdom Friedrich Wilhelm Rembert von Berg granted consent for the formation of a committee to oversee the construction of the church. Two years later, the bishop announced the launch of preparatory work.

The church Building Committee was founded by Prince Vladimir Cherkassky and General Yevgenii Rozhnov, for which the construction of the church at Praga was also an answer to the real needs of the population and an opportunity to build it in a strategic part of the city (opposite the Vilnius train station) to provide a long lasting sign that Warsaw belonged to the Russian Empire. In the words of Rozhnov, the church was another way to consolidate Russian rule. After its completion, General Rozhnov and the director of the works, Colonel Palitsyn, received state awards.

The strategic nature of the construction led to the architect of the Holy Synod, Nikolai Sychev, submitting a blueprint and cost estimate in 1867. It was assumed the building would have one dome and be without a bell tower, which had a total cost of close to 122 thousand rubles. After opinions on the request from St. Petersburg, the Building Committee introduced significant modifications to the church making the church conform with the temples of Kiev, which was to emphasize the relationship of the Orthodox Church in Polish lands with the Kiev metropolis and to deny allegations of its foreign origins, and artificial introduction. They were also instructed to erect a bell tower, increasing the total cost to 140 thousand rubles. The Building Committee, wanting to obtain public funding for the investments, accepted the amendment and ordered construction of the church on a plan of a Greek cross with five domes. After the project changes, the building had an area of 776 square meters and a capacity for 800-1000 people in a service.

=== Construction ===
The foundation stone of the church was laid June 14, 1867, but prior to this phase of construction stabilization of the soil was needed. Despite these initial delays, the facility was ready in the raw state as early as the end of 1868, and work on the design was completed within the next six months. The building work was managed by the engineer Colonel Palitsyn. The first fully independent Orthodox church architecture in Warsaw was created - others, such as the church of the Holy Trinity in Warsaw were Orthodox churches with no distinct features; homemade eastern religious architecture; housed in buildings that were Roman Catholic (such as the church of Our Lady of Vladimir Icon in Wola); or were part of the larger architectural complexes, which was a natural limit to their creators (such as the Church of St. Alexander Nevsky Cathedral in the Warsaw Citadel). During the construction of the church, they worked exclusively with Russian artists.

The consecration of the church was combined with a solemn procession of Warsaw Orthodox clergy, which went to the sound of bells at nine o'clock in the morning from the council of the Holy Trinity at Długa Street in Warsaw. The procession welcomed Archbishop Ioannicius, who began the ceremony and then celebrated the Holy Liturgy and the service of thanksgiving.

=== The functioning of the church prior to the First World War ===
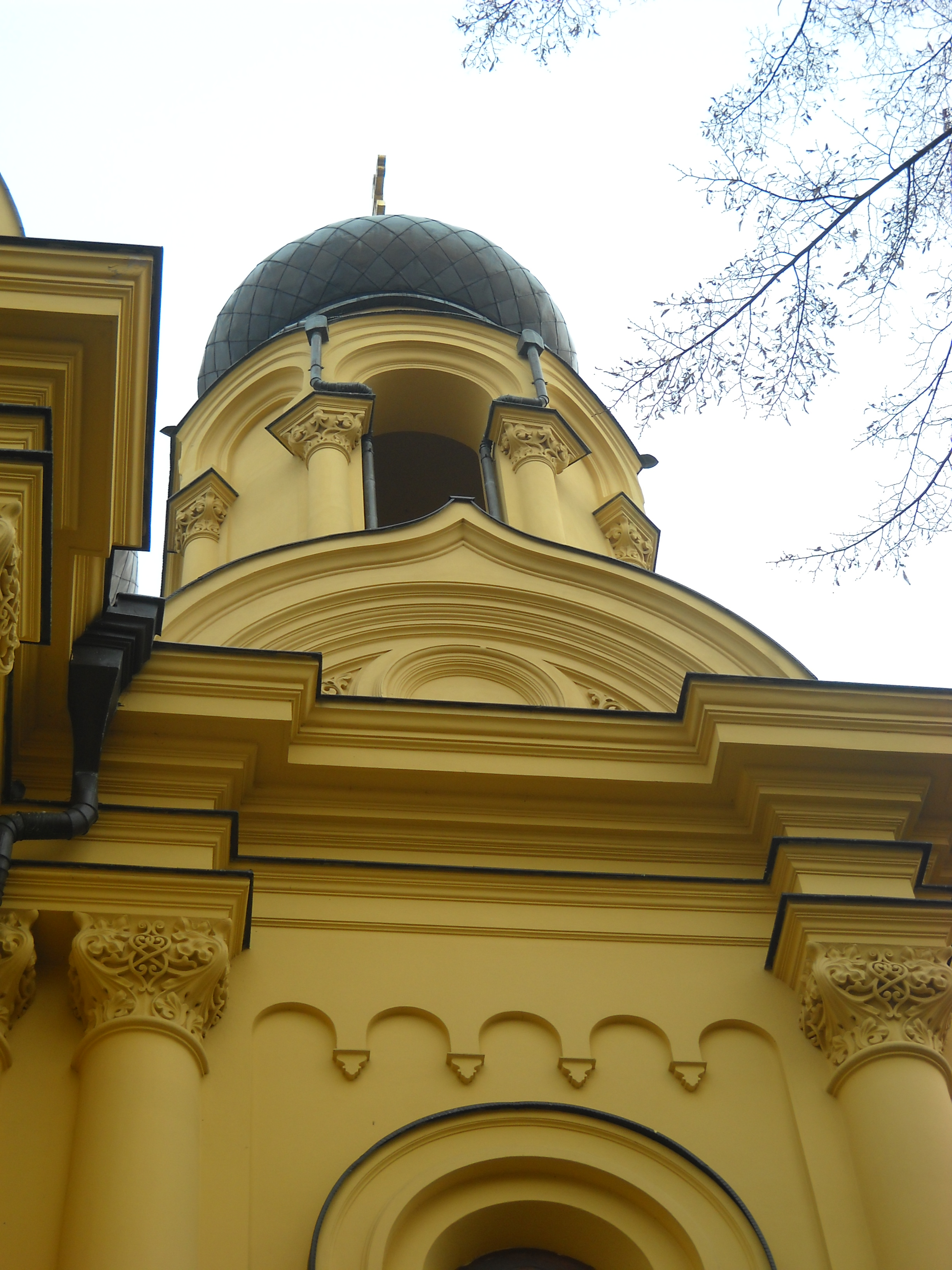
One of the side domes of the church.

St. Mary Magdalene, until the end of World War I, served parish church functions only. Nevertheless, with its construction and maintenance, the Russian authorities thought it extremely prestigious, due to its location. Kholmsko-Varshavskii Eparkhial'nyi Vestnik, the official organ of the Eparchy of Chełm and Warsaw, wrote in 1895:

Guided by the train to Warsaw, [the Russians] encountered a beautiful temple, and of course, it is an Orthodox church (...). The appearance of this temple impacts on their feelings and makes (...) that they forget about the sad fate of Russians in the country. The sound of the bell blurs in their soul the thought of Poland as a place where much Russian blood has been shed.

— P. Paszkowski, Pod berłem Romanowów, s. 83.

Because of this connection, and because of the special importance of the church by 1895, a general overhaul was requested by Archbishop Flavian (Gorodetskii) in a letter to the Holy Synod's, Konstantin Pobedonostsev. He claimed that the church was in a poor condition and could cause an adverse impression compared to nearby Roman Catholic Church of St. Michael and St. Florian, which was still under construction. The archbishop also pointed to the fact that the church often aroused the keen interest of foreign visitors to Warsaw. The renovation was led by Vladimir Pokrovskii, acting as the principal architect for the eparchy. The building was re-consecrated after the work was completed on 8 September 1895.

=== The interwar period and World War II ===
In 1921, the Cathedral of St. Mary Magdalene was renamed the Metropolitan Council, becoming the Polish Orthodox Church's most important church. The council announced the decision along with the recognition of the Polish Orthodox Church as an autocephalous Orthodox Church, contained under the patriarch of Constantinople. This took place on Sept. 17, 1925. With the decision to knock down the Alexander Nevsky Cathedral in Piłsudski Square, saving the Mary Magdalene was connected with progress in reclaiming other Orthodox churches (by the Polish state and the Roman Catholic Church) in the Polish capital, leaving only two Orthodox churches (the other being St. John Climacus's Church). Others were transferred to other religions or demolished.

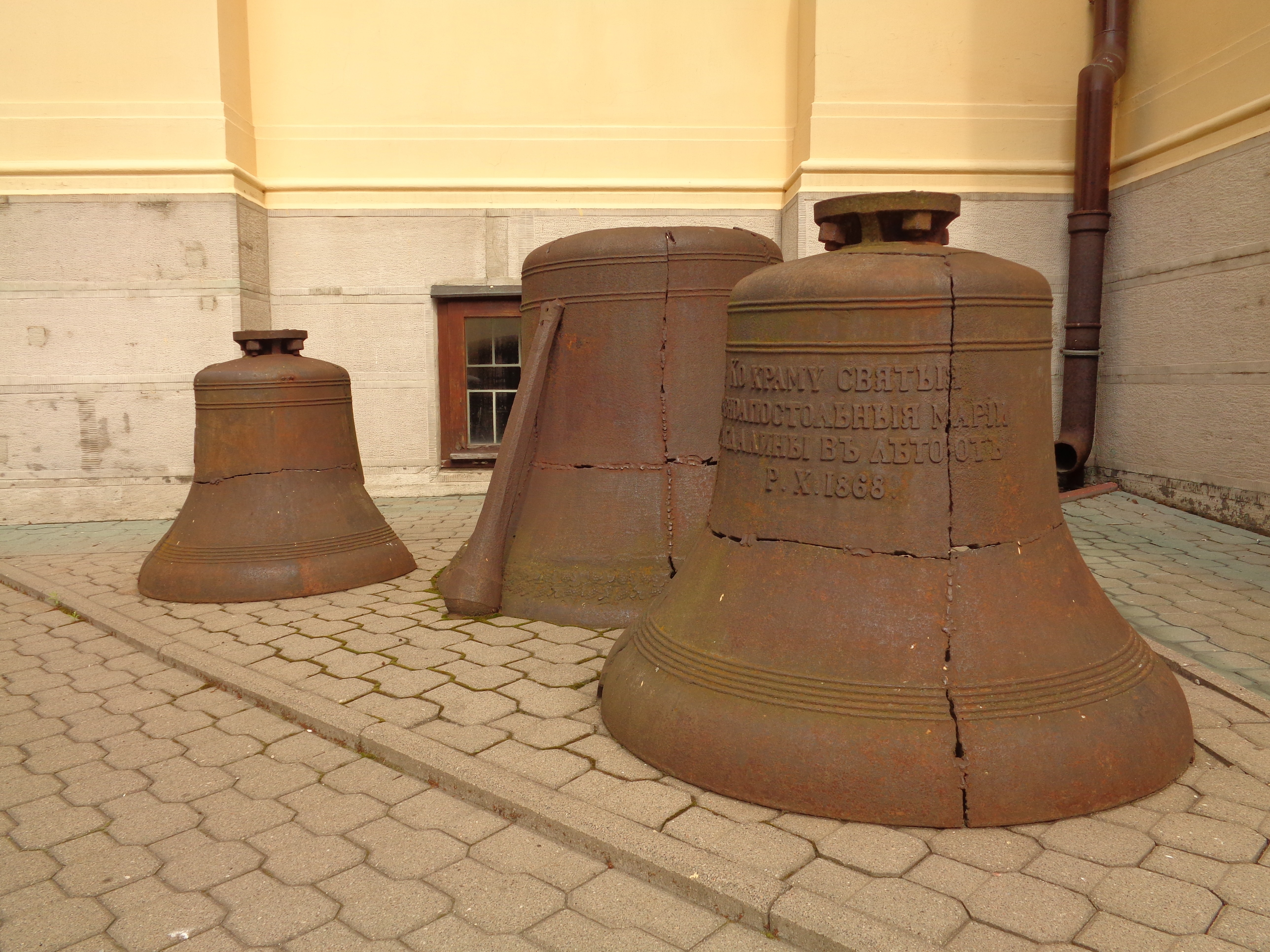
Broken cathedral bells.

Plans for demolition were with the city council, but the local authority finally abandoned these in 1926. To celebrate this decision, an icon to the Black Madonna of Częstochowa, an image especially revered by Polish Catholics, was placed in the cathedral. In 1928, a second temple, the chapel of Christ's Passion, was created in the basement of the church, which stored part of the salvaged equipment from the Alexander Nevsky Cathedral. Earlier, in 1925, a major renovation began. Due to lack of money, this had to be interrupted after only the outside of the building had been worked on. Only in 1930 was it possible to undertake renovation work of the interior, in particular the cleaning of the frescoes. The Repair Commission, headed by Bishop Sawa (Jerzy Sowietow), also ordered the restoration of the iconostasis of St. Job of Pochayiv and the repair of electrical installations.

During World War II, the church did not suffer major losses. In 1939, an aerial bomb blast in the vicinity caused minor damage to the roof of one aisle. In autumn 1944, after shootings in Praga by the Nazis, one of the bullets hit the largest of the domes, causing the collapse of its roof. Losses arising in this way were fixed temporarily in 1945. An extensive fire almost resulted in the destruction of the church in 1944, but the spontaneous reaction of the population of Praga saved it. In 1944, Germany confiscated the church bells for the purpose of making missiles. The bells were broken before removal, and then abandoned. It turned out that they were not suitable for melting down. The destroyed bells were welded together and placed near the entrance to the building. The new bell was purchased for the church in 1947, from the contributions of the faithful. Repeated requests from the pastor, Fr. Jan Kowalenko to the Ministry of Public Administration added five more bells.

=== During the People's Republic of Poland ===
Immediately after the war, the clergy council planned to make repairs. Lack of funds and a decrease in the number of parishioners, which did not give an opportunity to effectively fundraise, prevented this from happening. Only from 1955 to 1957, with 90% of the funding provided by the Municipal Conservation, Social Fund for the Reconstruction of Warsaw and the Church Fund, were new stairs, new council paving and a new gate added. No attempt was made - because of the lack of funds - to restore the frescoes, which had been damaged by moisture.

The Metropolitan of Warsaw, Stefan (Stepan Rudyk), initiated subsequent repair work. Selected in 1966, by the Repair Committee, Fr. Semeniuk returned the following year for public funds. The communist authorities granted a million złotys for this purpose, but against the enormity of losses inside the building in the absence of regular maintenance, the committee also looked for other sources of support, including from abroad. The poor state of the frescoes made the Arts and Theological Commission, cooperating with the committee, consider completely new decorative painting. This did not occur.

There is a fresco of the Last Supper in the altar room. Next to it is an image of Christ in the Garden of Gethsemane, and the fresco above of Oranta. On the side walls, the council planned the painting of the Three Holy Hierarchs images, St. Stefan and patrons of the Metropolitan of Warsaw: St. George, St. Dionysius, St. Timothy and St. Macarius. Above the entrance was planned a composition showing the birth of Christ, with an iconostasis of Christ the Savior. The project did not represent the entire surface of the walls but included selected images of saints and scenes depicting 12 great feasts of the Orthodox Church.

It was also proposed to place information boards with the history of the church in the atrium. The Renovation Committee organized a competition for the project, but this initiative was blocked by the Conservation Authority, ordering instead the exact reproduction of the frescoes from the first years of the council. The work was led by Tadeusz Romanowski and Ryszard Bielecki, and the representative of the Church overseeing the work was Hegumen Sawa (Hrycuniak). This stage of the repair was combined with the installation of electrical and sound equipment. In 1965 the cathedral was added to the Register of Monuments. Services did not take place during the building work. The faithful instead prayed in the lower chapel or in the private Archangel Michael Chapel of the Orthodox Metropolitan House.

As part of the finer work inside a cathedral, Adam Stalony-Dobrzański made a new stained glass window showing the meeting of Christ with Mary Magdalene.

=== The Third Republic of Poland ===
In 1996, the new parish priest, Fr. Jan Sezonow, took part in a thorough renovation of the lower chapel.

New renovations were initiated, in turn, by Metropolitan Sawa of Warsaw (Hrycuniak). After 1998, the floor of the cathedral was changed, windows and electrical systems were replaced, and entrance stairs were built. In 1999, new safeguards were established against the accumulation of groundwater. At the beginning of the 21st century, another restoration of the frescoes was made, which revealed that they were in worse condition than had been expected. Therefore, some elements - such as the Lord's Prayer written in the main dome - had to be repainted. Gilding on the crosses and domes was also fixed.

== Architecture ==
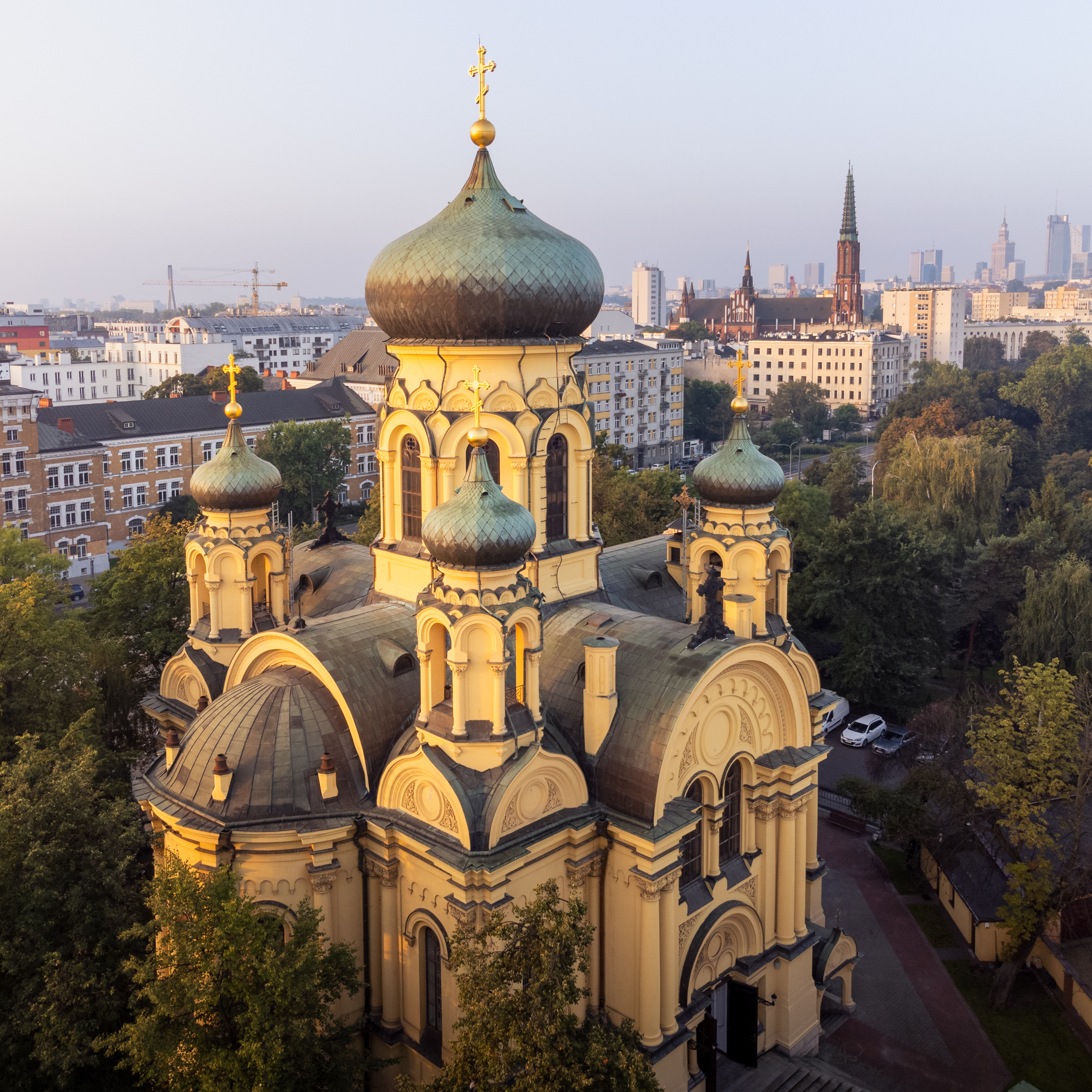
The main dome of the church.

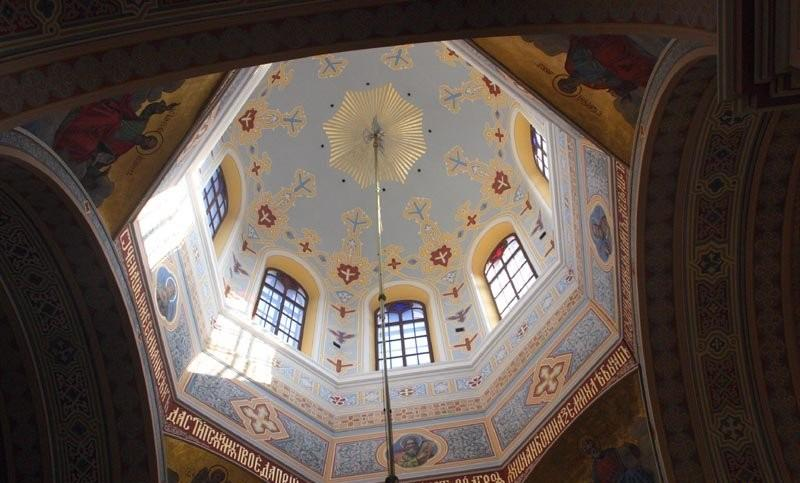
The main drum inside the church.

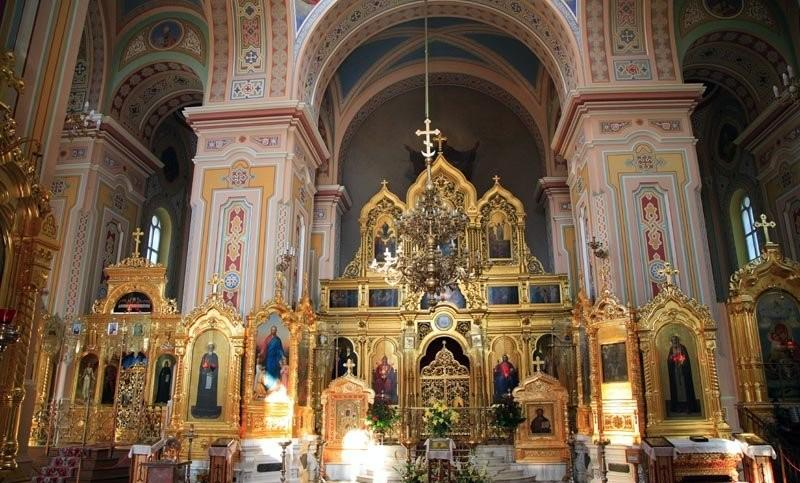
View of the main iconostasis. On the left side altar is St. Jowa Poczajowskiego veiled. To its right, in front of the pillar, the icon of St. Sergius of Radonezh, referred to as the icon of Christ with children.

The building was built on a Greek cross, covered with a hipped roof. The church has five onion-domes with Orthodox crosses, located on octagonal drums. Side drums at the same time have a bell tower with ten bells cast in Westphalia. All the windows in the building are semicircular decoratively framed motifs and columns. Drums, below the roof, are decorated with rows of arcs. Originally on the west wall of the church, in Tondo form, Vinogradov was a composition depicting Christ surrounded by Saints Cyril and Methodius. On the eastern wall, the same artist painted Anthony and Theodosius Pechersky in Tondo form. On the northern wall is the image of the Mother of God based on the Kazan Icon of the Mother of God, Holy Martyrs characters, Catherine and St. Alexandra, and on the south - Saints Helen and Olga. All these images have been degrading gradually and no longer survive.

The main entrance to the church was located on the west with a closed semicircular portico with double half-columns situated on pedestals. Over the portico is a forged window with a decorative border, below which are three empty Tondo. The entire west facade repeats the shape of the portico. The entrance to the lower church, located below the main church, is on the south side. From the east, the church has an apse with a row of semi-circular windows. In a bay is an image of the patron saint of the church.

=== Interior ===
==== Frescos ====
Until the late 19th century, work continued on decoration inside the temple. A group of 27 murals were painted by Sergei Vinogradov: he made firmament images of the Mother of God, Moses, Elijah, David, Isaac, evangelists, and ornate text format prayer to Our Father. On the side walls of the church the same creator painted figures of Constantine the Great and St. Vladimir, and the apostles James, Philip, Bartholomew, Thomas, Simon and Jude Thaddaeus and Saints Basil the Great, John Chrysostom, Nicholas, Gregory the New Theologian, Sergius of Radonezh and the "Moscow miracle-workers" Saints Alexis, Jonah and Peter. In the room he also made an altar fresco of The Last Supper and the figure of God the Father. Over the entrance door is a fresco with the image of Our Lady, and over the windows are frescos of St. Vladimir and St. Constantine the Great.

Distribution of images of saints have cast their importance in the history of salvation. Characters of Old Testament prophets, according to the Byzantine tradition, are found on the inner side of the main drum, which was indicative of their mediation between earth and celestial sphere. In contrast, figures of saints connected with the history of Russia would remind you of the status of the Orthodox Church as the state religion in that country.

==== Icons ====
The focal point of the lowest order are openwork tsarist gates, which were icons of the Annunciation and the Evangelists. On both sides of the gate were traditionally arranged figures of Christ and the Virgin Mary. On the left side of the tsarist gates are icons of the prophet Elisha, and St. Vladimir, on the right, St. Stephen and Mary Magdalene. The second row forms (left to right) an icon of the Mother of God, the Nativity with the Mother of God, the Last Supper, the Baptism of the Lord and the Birth of Christ. The top row is an icon of the Holy Trinity, the Resurrection and the Ascension of the Lord.

In 1892, an icon of Saint Job of Pochayiv was added beside the altar. It is double-sided and contains images of Christ, the Virgin, the Archangel Gabriel and Saint Job in the bottom row, and the icon of the Last Supper in the upper row. The tsarist gates contain the same icons as the main gates of the iconostasis. At the end of the 19th century, an iconostasis that was originally in the church of Tatiany Rzymianki was added.

In 1926 an icon of the Black Madonna of Częstochowa was placed at the second of the altars. This is a votive altar of thanksgiving for the survival of the Orthodox church's sacred objects.

==== Other items of equipment ====
The church had two stoves for heating. The original plan was to install modern and unprecedented gas lighting in the church, against which the Archbishop Ioannikii demanded the use of traditional wax candles. As the archbishop argued, wax softens the fire, which reminds man that his heart was becoming softer in the light of the teachings of Christ.

In addition to the icons located in icon cases, the church also had images of the saints set separately. These icons were funded in 1869 by the Warsaw district military command, as a gift of gratitude for saving the life of Tsar Alexander II from another coup.

In 1890, to the right of the iconostasis, was a copy of the Icon of the Mother of God, Pochayiv. It was given to the church by the Archimandrite Macarius, a monk at Mount Athos, and in 1915, during the exodus of Russians after World War I, it was taken to Russia. The current image is a copy made at a later date by Archimandrite Paisius, a monk of the Pochayiv Lavra. The council has a total of 15 images of saints placed in a gilded icon cases. There are icons of St. Andrew, St. Alexandra, St. Sergius of Radonezh, Christ blessing the children, Ascension, St. Alexander Nevsky, St. Nicholas, St. Seraphim of Sarov, Pochayiv Icon of Our Lady, St. Panteleimon, and St. Theodosius of Chernihiv.

Under the pillars of the council are icons of St. Stephen the Archdeacon, St. Anthony Pecherskii, St. Elizabeth, and St. Mitrofan. In the 19th century, also in Pochayiv Lavra, there also appeared two church banners portraying the Resurrection of the Lord and the patron of the church and St. Job of Pochayiv.

=== Lower chapel ===
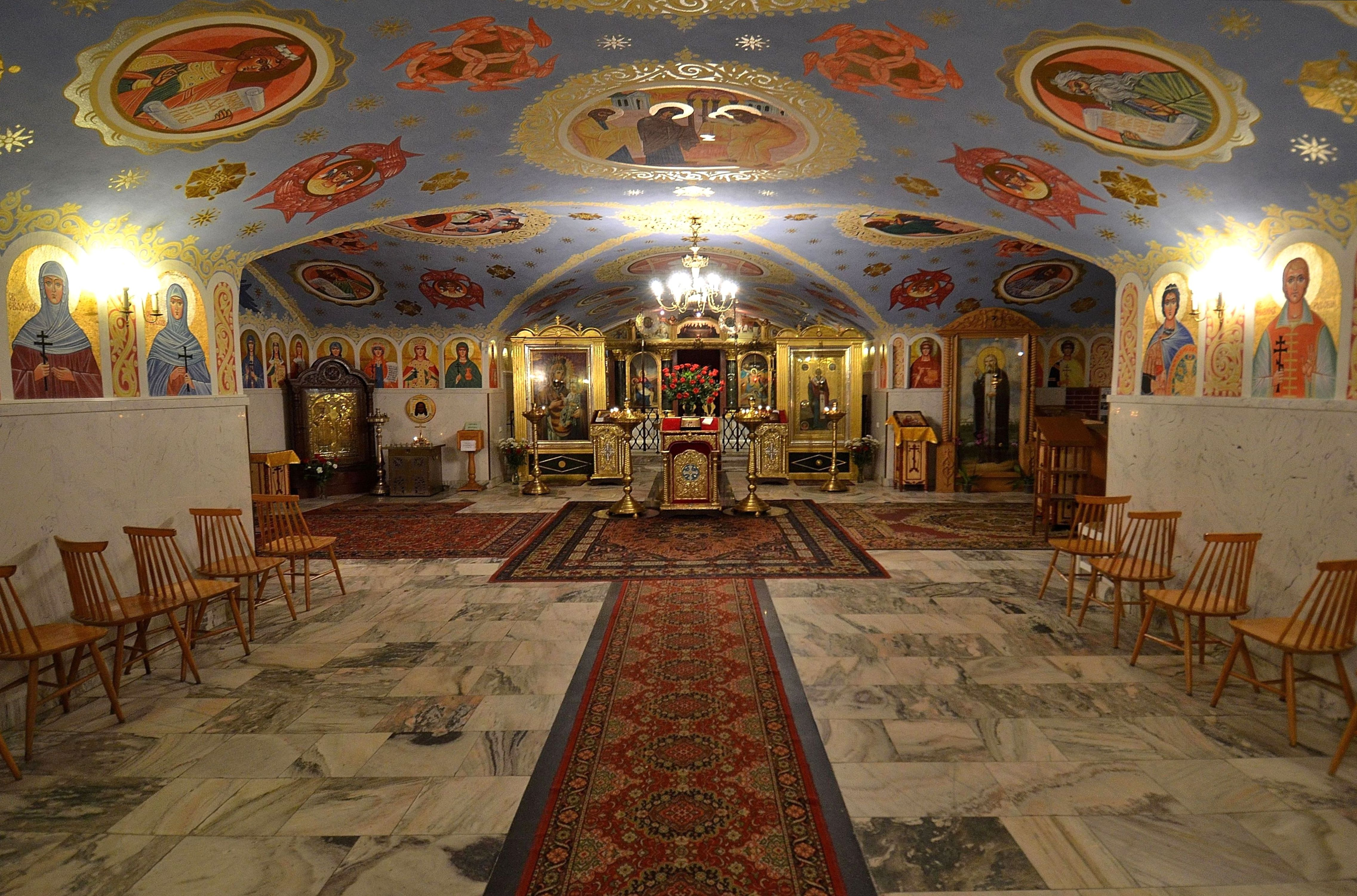
The interior of the Passion of Christ chapel.

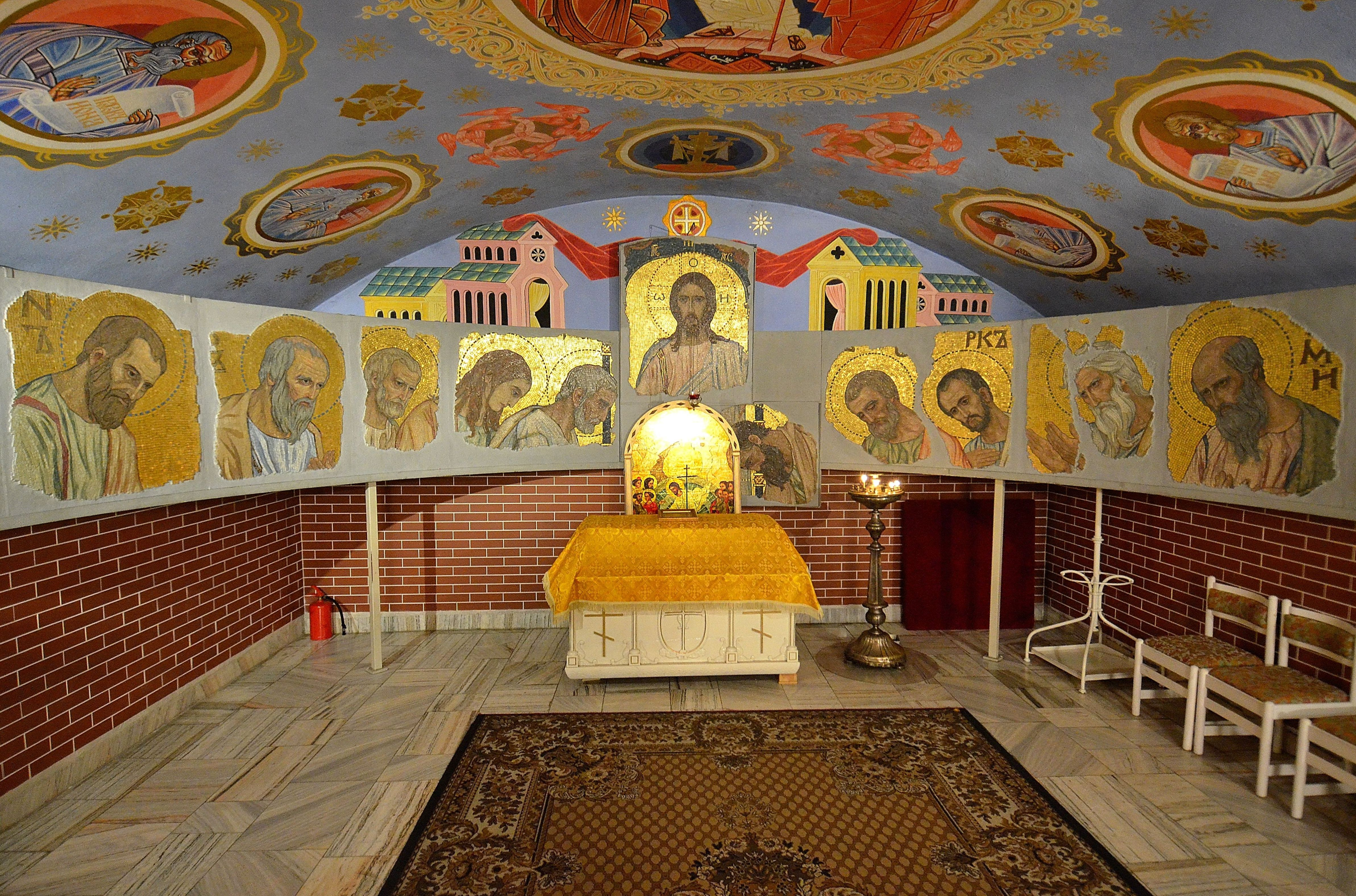
Fragments of the mosaic Communion of the Apostles of the Orthodox Cathedral of St. Alexander Nevsky Cathedral in the right aisle of the chapel.

The chapel of the Passion of Christ was organized in the basement of the church in 1928. It looked different than from now and included some very modest iconostasis, the aisles were narrow, and the walls were decorated with frescoes. In September 1939 the chapel served local residents as a raid shelter.

The current appearance of the chapel came about in the second half of the 20th century. During this period, Lidia and Sotiris Pantopulos did, among other art, frescoes on the ceiling. The side walls were dug closer to the foundations, increasing the area of the chapel and giving it the form of a cross. In the right aisle, mosaic fragments by Viktor Vasnetsov of the Communion of the Apostles from the St. Alexander Nevsky Cathedral (which was demolished in 1926), which the parish received from the National Museum in 1985. In the mosaic, which is the lower part of the apse altar triptych, only the head of Christ and the 12 apostles is preserved. After cleaning, it was mounted in a special frame, forming a semi-circular gallery.

At the back of the chapel is located symbolic Golgotha. Work was also carried out on the iconostasis, including a gilded frame icon and placed between the elements cut from the malachite columns of the cathedral in Saxon Square (where the St. Alexander Nevsky Cathedral was located), passed along by the National Museum along with the mosaics.

The main icon in the lower chapel is a copy of the Icon of the Iverska Mother of God, which was donated in 1904 by the monks of Athos. It was moved here from the top of the church and set in a decorative case at the left front of the iconostasis. Across from the icon is placed the patron saint of the lower temple - St. Dionysius the Areopagite - a gift in 1933 from the Metropolitan Dionizy (Waledyński) from the diocese of Volhynia.

== Saint Joseph's Oratory. Michael the Archangel ==
Near the cathedral, the Orthodox Metropolitan House (al. Solidarności 52) has a chapel for Archangel Michael, opened in 1999. The chapel is under the direct management of the Metropolitan (superior) of the Polish Autocephalous Orthodox Church.

== Bibliography ==
- Katedra Równej Apostołom św. Marii Magdaleny (in Polish). Warsaw: Warszawska Metropolia Prawosławna. 2009. ISBN 978-83-60311-27-1.
- Łuczyńska J., Paterek J., Sitarek N., Metropolitalna Cerkiew Polskiego Autokefalicznego Kościoła Prawosławnego pw. św. Marii Magdaleny, al. Solidarności 52 (pol.), [accessed 2009-08-10].
- Paszkiewicz P., Pod berłem Romanowów. Sztuka rosyjska w Warszawie 1815-1915, Warsaw 1991.
- Pilich M., Warszawska Praga. Przewodnik, Fundacja "Centrum Europy", Warsaw 2008, ISBN 83-923305-7-9.
- Ks. Sawicki D., Historia Katedry Metropolitalnej w Warszawie in Wiara i poznanie. Księga pamiątkowa dedykowana Jego Eminencji Profesorowi Sawie (Hrycuniakowi) prawosławnemu metropolicie warszawskiemu i całej Polski, University of Bialystok, Bialystok 2008, ISBN 978-83-7431-160-1.
- Sienkiewicz H., Cerkwie w krainie kościołów, TRIO, Warsaw 2006, ISBN 978-83-60623-04-6.
- Sokoł K., Sosna A., Kopuły nad Wisłą. Prawosławne cerkwie w centralnej Polsce w latach 1815-1915, Moscow, MID "Synergia", OCLC 749634498.
