= Polish Ecumenical Council =

Polish Ecumenical Council (Polish: Polska Rada Ekumeniczna) founded in 1946 to promote interchurch cooperation among the minority Christian denominations in Poland. There are seven member churches: the Baptist Church, Lutheran Church, Methodist Church, Reformed Church, Mariavite Church, Old Catholic Church, and the Polish Orthodox Church. Cooperation with the Catholic Church began in 1974 when the council established a Combined Ecumenical Commission to deal with the analogous ecumenical commission of the Catholic Polish Episcopal Conference. In 1977 the council named a subcommittee for discussion of individual theological questions; by 1980 bilateral dialogs had begun among members sharing similar doctrine. Given Poland's history of religious tolerance, the restoration of religious freedom in 1989 was expected to expand the tentative ecumenical contacts achieved during the Communist era. In 2000, the Polish Catholic Church signed a declaration with the council member churches, excluding the Baptist Church, mutually recognizing baptism.

As of January 2019, the council head was Lutheran bishop Jerzy Samiec.
