= Church of the Holy Myrrh-Bearing Women, Lublin =

Orthodox church in Lublin, Poland

Church of the Holy Myrrh-Bearing Women
- Cerkiew Świętych Niewiast Niosących Wonności
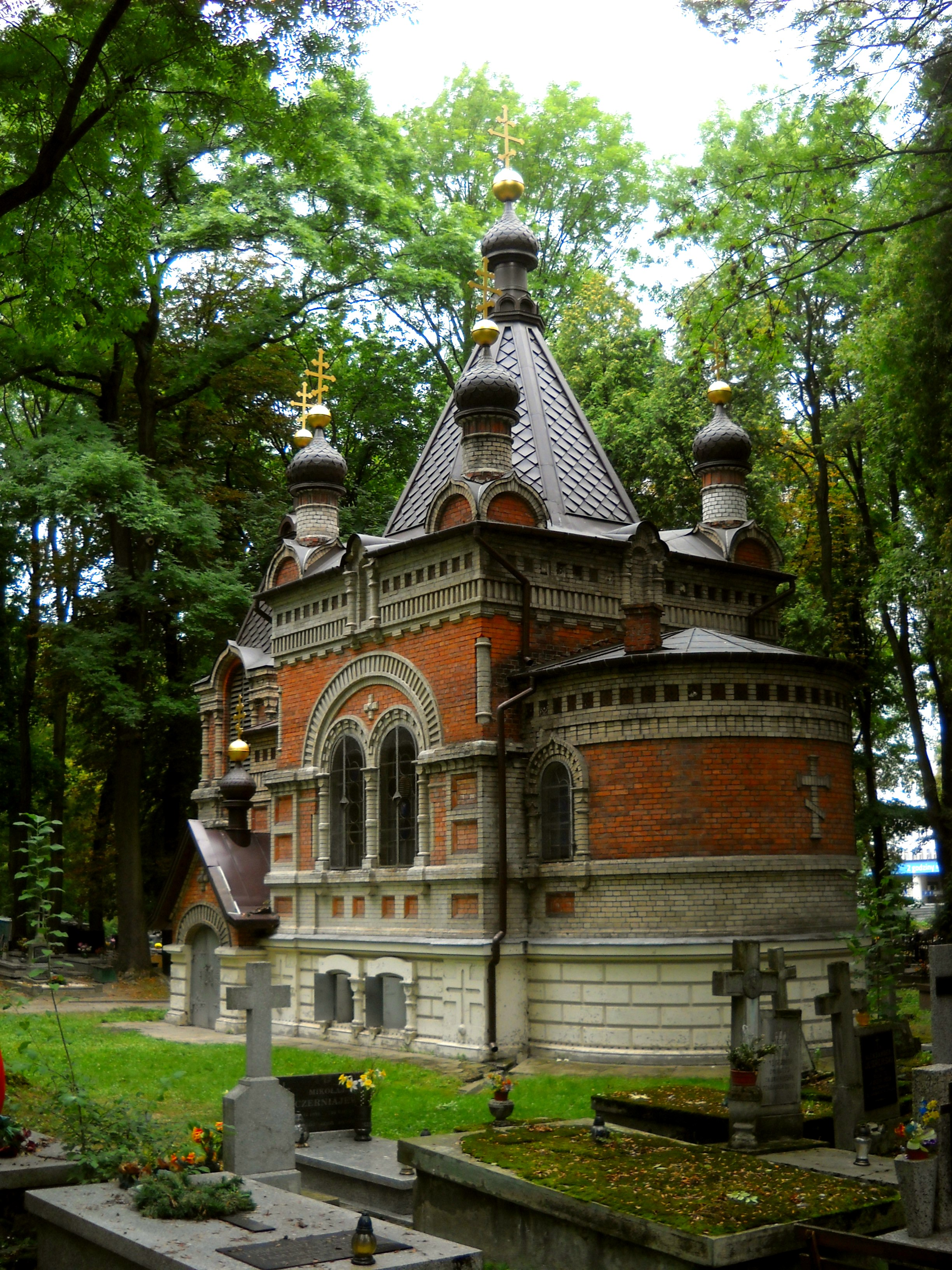
- General view
- Church of the Holy Myrrh-Bearing Women
- 51°14′37.9″N 22°32′58.5″E
- Location: Lublin; Poland
- Denomination: Eastern Orthodoxy
- Churchmanship: Polish Orthodox Church

History
- Status: Active Orthodox church
- Founder: Andrei Dieikun
- Dedication: Holy Myrrh-Bearing Women
- Dedicated: August 28, 1903; April 18, 2017

Architecture
- Architect: Grigory Artynov
- Style: Russian Revival
- Completed: 1903

Specifications
- Materials: brick

Administration
- Diocese: Diecezja lubelsko-chełmska

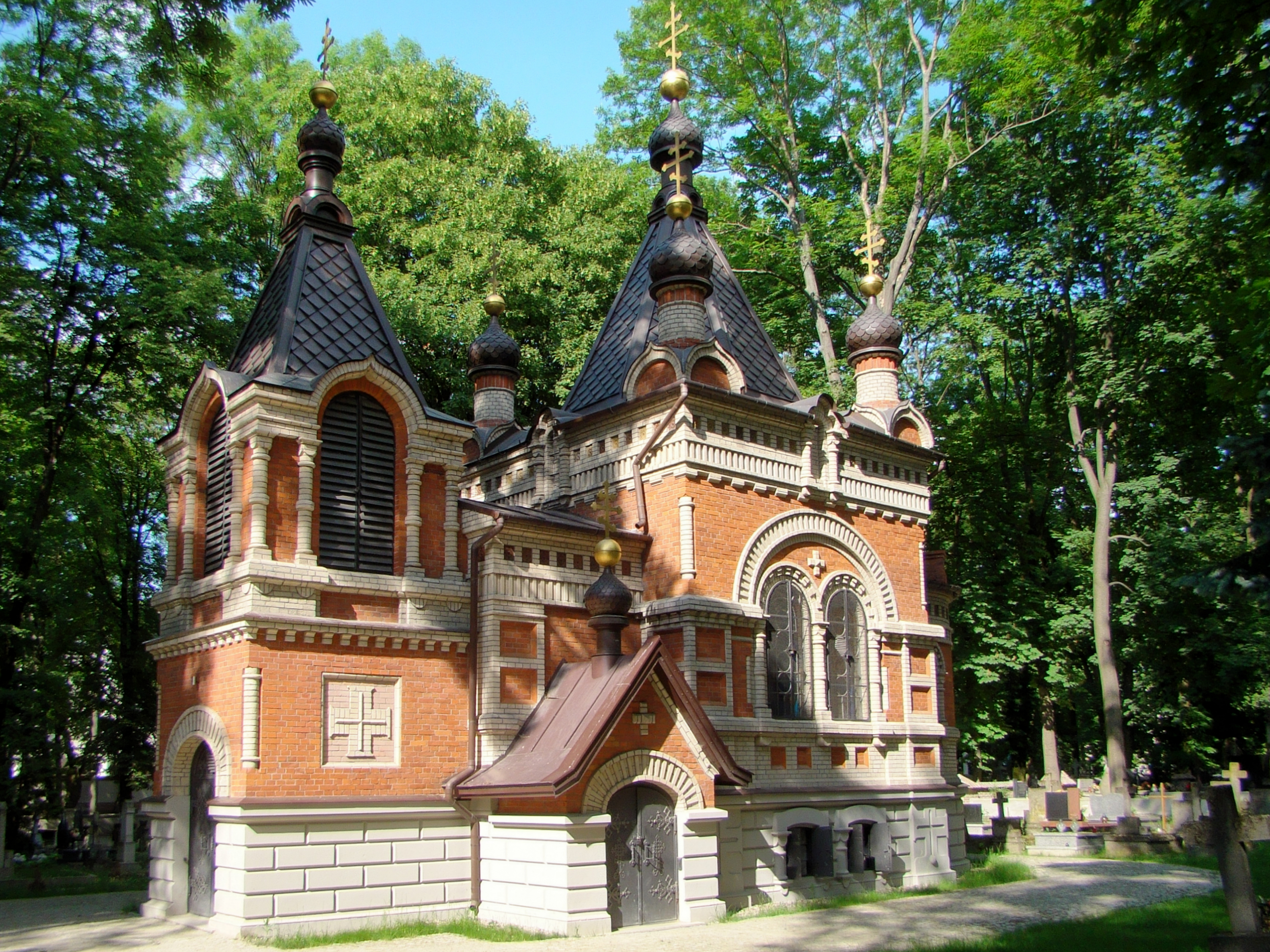
View of the church from the side

Church of the Holy Myrrh-Bearing Women is an Orthodox cemetery church in Lublin. It belongs to the Cathedral Parish of the Transfiguration in Lublin, within the Lublin Deanery of the Diocese of Lubllin and Chełm of the Polish Orthodox Church.

The church was funded by Andrei Dieikun, the president of the Lublin Treasury Chamber. It was built between 1902 and 1903, and its dedication took place on 28 August 1903. From the beginning, it has served as a cemetery church, hosting funeral ceremonies and memorial services for the deceased.

The church represents the Russian Revival style in the Moscow-Yaroslavl (Neo-Russian) variant. It is a five-domed structure with a bell tower above the church porch, featuring a tripartite layout and two levels. Services are held in the upper section, where the altar and a single-tier iconostasis are located. The crypt on the lower level contains the tomb of the church's founder and his wife.The building is situated within the Orthodox section of the 19th-century Orthodox cemetery, which is part of a larger cemetery complex on Lipowa Street in Lublin.

== History ==
The Church of the Holy Myrrh-Bearing Women was built at the beginning of the 20th century. Its founder was Andrei Dieikun, the president of the local treasury chamber and the senior warden of the parish at the Cathedral of the Exaltation of the Holy Cross in Lublin. He intended for the construction of the church to commemorate his late wife, donating 12,000 rubles for the purpose. The cornerstone-laying ceremony took place on 3 June 1902. The building was designed by engineer Grigory Artynov, while construction was overseen by a committee led by Lublin Governor Vladimir Tchorzhevsky. The dedication of the church on 28 August 1903 was presided over by Bishop Eulogius of Lublin, assisted by Archimandrite Dionysius, rector of the Chełm Theological Seminary, as well as Proto-Priests Nikolai Strashkevich and Nikolai Glinsky from the Basilica of the Birth of the Virgin Mary in Chełm, along with clergy from Lublin's Orthodox churches. Andrei Dieikun did not live to see the completion of the church and was buried in its two-level crypt alongside his wife. Governor Vladimir Tchorzhevsky was also laid to rest in the church.

From the outset, the church functioned as a funeral chapel, with space for approximately 100 worshippers during services.

According to historians Sokół and Sosna, the church was originally dedicated to Saints Andrew Stratelates and Martyr Maria, the patron saints of the Dieikun couple. This dedication is confirmed by church press from the period immediately following the building's consecration. However, Cynalewska-Kuczma mentions four patrons − besides Andrew and Maria, also Saints Mary and Martha of Bethany. Today, the upper section of the church is dedicated to the Holy Myrrh-Bearing Women, while the lower crypt is dedicated to Prophet Elijah.

After Poland regained independence in 1918, the Orthodox community lost many of the churches it had used during the period of Russian rule due to a nationwide repossession campaign. At that time, alongside the Cathedral of the Transfiguration, the cemetery church on Lipowa Street was one of only two Orthodox churches remaining in Lublin.

After World War II, the church remained in the hands of the Orthodox parish thanks to the efforts of Father Alexei Baranov (priest), who secured legal recognition of Orthodox property rights from the new authorities.

In 1984, the church was added to the heritage register, and less than a year later, the entire cemetery complex on Lipowa Street was also granted heritage status.

In the early 21st century, the iconostasis in the upper church, along with its icons, was restored. In 2009, Archbishop Abel of Lublin and Chełm reconsecrated the iconostasis. The church had previously suffered acts of vandalism, and in 2007, approximately 100 kg of copper sheeting was stolen from its roof. In September 2013, a renovation of the Orthodox cemetery in Lublin began, including the restoration of the church's façade and the installation of new lighting. After these works were completed − along with new interior frescoes − the church was reconsecrated on 18 April 2017 by Archbishop Abel.

== Architecture ==
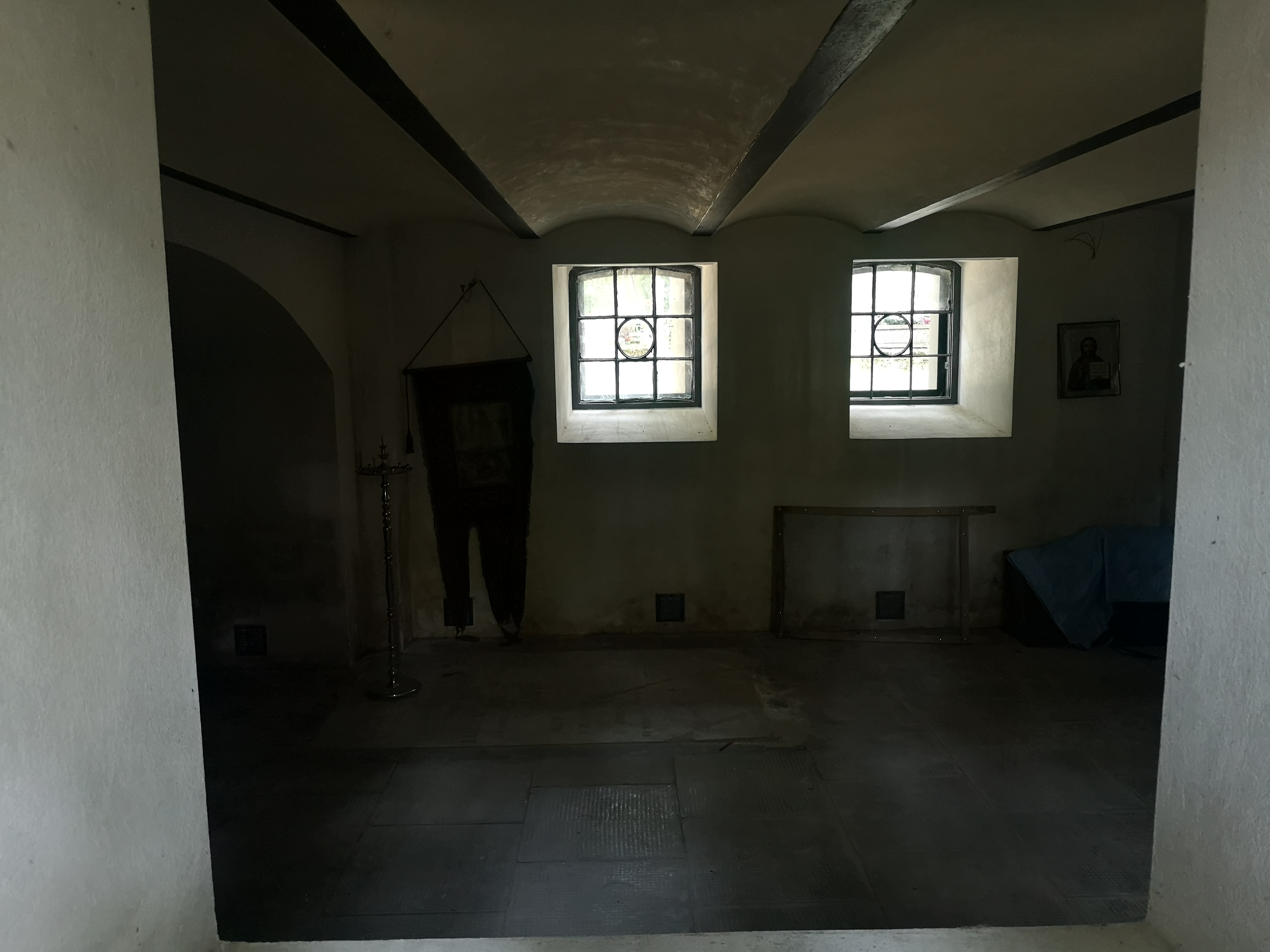
Interior of the lower church with tombstones

The cemetery church in Lublin was built in the Russian Revival style. It is a tripartite structure. The entrance to the building is through a rectangular church porch, above which rises a bell tower topped with a tent-like roof, crowned by a small onion-shaped dome. The church nave is built on a square plan, with a similar tented roof and onion-shaped dome above it. Four similar constructions are located at the corners of the nave, standing on cylindrical tholobates. The chancel is situated in a semi-circular apse.

All the church's domes are crowned with gilded crosses, cast in the E. Plage and T. Laskiewicz factory in Lublin. The ornamental details used in the exterior decoration of the temple clearly refer to the architecture of 17th-century churches in Moscow and Yaroslavl, as evidenced by the use of five domes over the nave, kokoshniks, lowered arches, the use of two-colored and unplastered brick, and the characteristic rhombus-shaped sheet metal work. The temple is also adorned with colorful tiles at the corners. Other elements, such as twin windows set in semi-circular arches and columns with cube-like capitals, were inspired by typical Russian Revival churches from Konstantin Thon's design catalog.

Inside the upper church, there is a single-tier iconostasis with a depiction of the Last Supper at the top. It was made in the Borisov workshop in Moscow at a cost of 975 rubles. Other icons were created in a different Moscow workshop, Niemirov's. The church bell tower houses six bells, cast in the Finlandskaya bell foundry at a cost of 743 rubles. The entrance to the upper church is reached by eight steps. The walls of this church are painted pink to a height matching the average human reach. Above the iconostasis is a Church Slavonic inscription reading Svyatyi Bozhe (Holy God – the beginning of the Trisagion). The upper church also contains an icon of the Resurrection.

The lower church is built from fieldstone and is a crypt half-sunk into the ground, illuminated by sunlight through its windows.
