= Polish Orthodox Church =

Eastern Orthodox jurisdiction in Poland

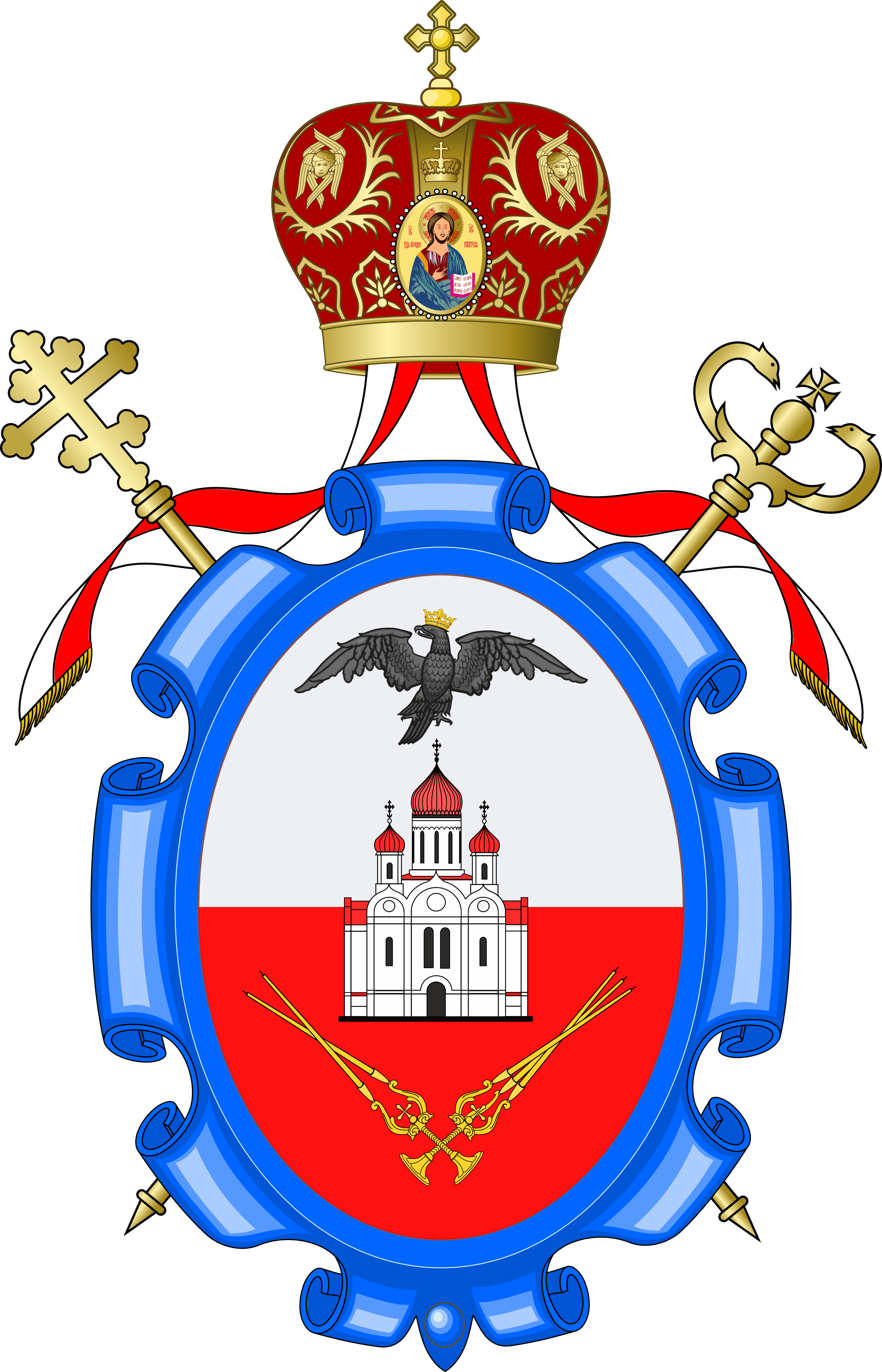
Polish Autocephalous Orthodox Church
- Polski Autokefaliczny Kościół Prawosławny
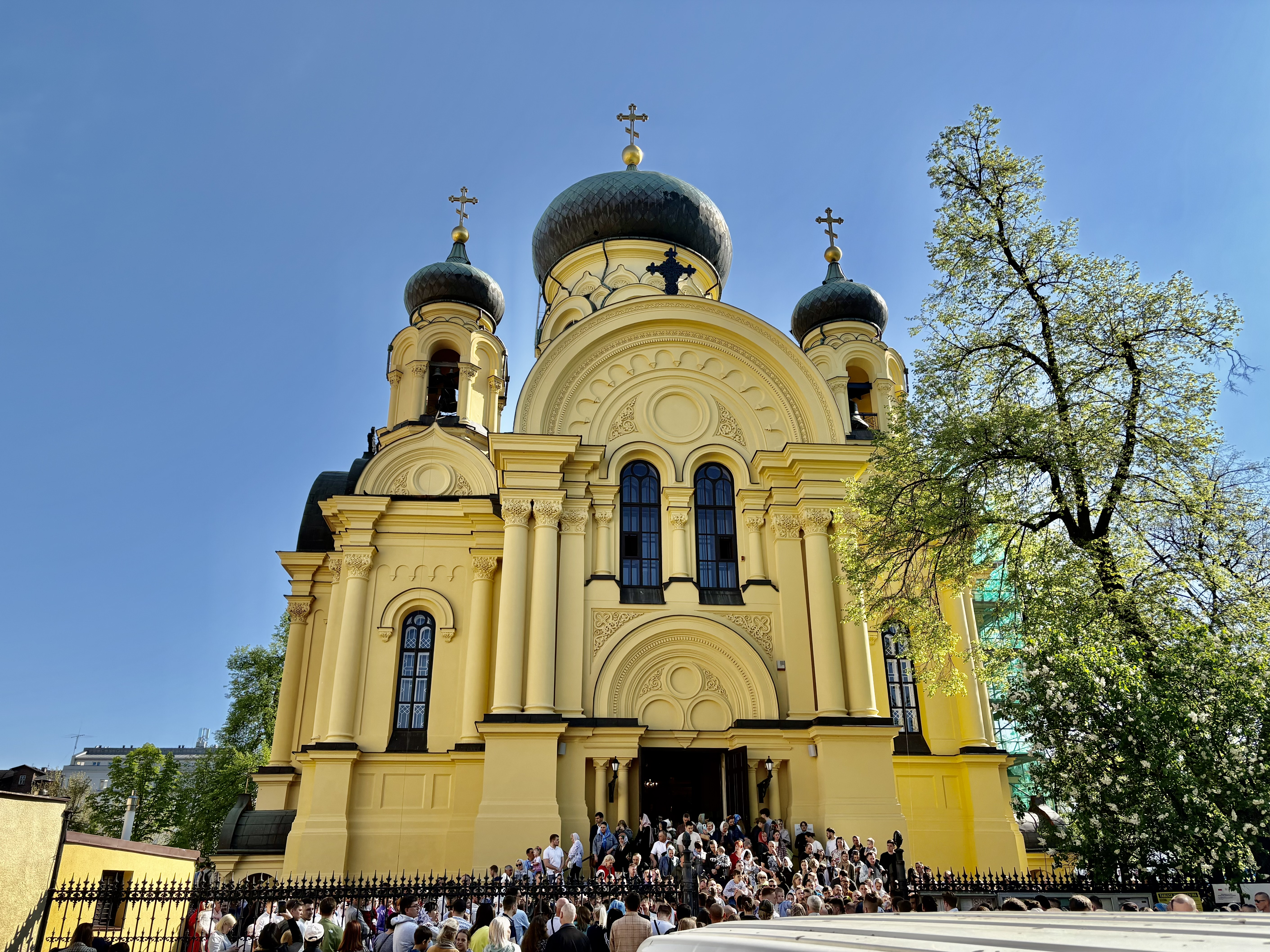
- Cathedral of St. Mary Magdalene, Warsaw, headquarters of the Polish Orthodox Church
- Type: Autocephaly
- Classification: Christian
- Orientation: Eastern Orthodox
- Scripture: Septuagint; New Testament
- Theology: Eastern Orthodox theology
- Primate: Archbishop of Warsaw and Metropolitan of All Poland, Sawa Hrycuniak.
- Bishops: 12
- Dioceses: 8
- Deaneries: 28
- Parishes: 278
- Language: Polish; Church Slavonic; Portuguese
- Liturgy: Byzantine Rite
- Headquarters: Warsaw, Poland
- Territory: Poland and Brazil
- Founder: Ss. Cyril and Methodius
- Independence: 1924 (from the Ecumenical Patriarchate); 1948 (from the Moscow Patriarchate)
- Recognition: Autocephaly recognised in 1924 by the Ecumenical Patriarchate of Constantinople, and in 1948 by the Russian Orthodox Church.
- Members: 503,996 (2021)
- Official website: cerkiew.pl

The Polish Autocephalous Orthodox Church (Polish: Polski Autokefaliczny Kościół Prawosławny), commonly known as the Polish Orthodox Church or the Orthodox Church of Poland, is an autocephalous Eastern Orthodox church in full communion with the other Eastern Orthodox churches. The church was established in 1924, to accommodate Orthodox Christians of Polish descent in the eastern part of the country, when Poland regained its independence after the First World War.

In total, it has approximately 500,000 adherents (2021). In the Polish census of 2011, 156,000 citizens declared themselves as members.

== History ==
=== Early history ===
The Christianization of the lands located in the region of the middle Bug River was carried out in the Byzantine tradition even before the Great Schism (1054). This process followed the adoption of Christianity by Vladimir the Great in 988 and subsequently by his state, Kievan Rus'. The formation of a parish network in this area continued throughout the 11th and 12th centuries and intensified after the establishment of an Orthodox diocese in Volodymyr-Volynskyi.

Further development of Eastern Christianity took place after the Bug region became part of the Kingdom of Galicia–Volhynia. In the late 1230s, Prince Daniel of Galicia (Danylo Romanovych) transferred the Orthodox bishopric to Chełm. This diocese belonged to the Metropolis of Kiev and was subordinate to the Ecumenical Patriarchate of Constantinople.

By 1370, three Orthodox metropolitan sees existed in Kiev, Novogrudok, and Halych, while episcopal sees were located in Turov, Chełm, Volodymyr-Volynskyi, Lutsk, and Przemyśl.

Religions in the Polish–Lithuanian Commonwealth in 1573: Catholic Orthodox Calvinist

The situation of the Orthodox Church changed after the Ruthenian lands came under the rule of Poland and the Grand Duchy of Lithuania, and later the joint state of the Polish–Lithuanian Commonwealth. Despite various legal restrictions, the Orthodox Church maintained a degree of institutional continuity. In the second half of the 16th century, the metropolis remained in Kiev, while episcopal sees existed in Polotsk, Smolensk, Turov, Chernihiv, Chełm, Volodymyr-Volynskyi, Lutsk, Przemyśl, and Lviv.

On 25 February 1585, King Stephen Báthory confirmed privileges concerning the rights and freedoms of the Orthodox Church within the Metropolis of Kiev. In 1589, Moscow became the seat of a patriarchate, which sought to extend its authority over Orthodox bishops in the Orthodox Church within the Polish–Lithuanian Commonwealth. The proposed church union was intended, in part, to counter these ambitions.

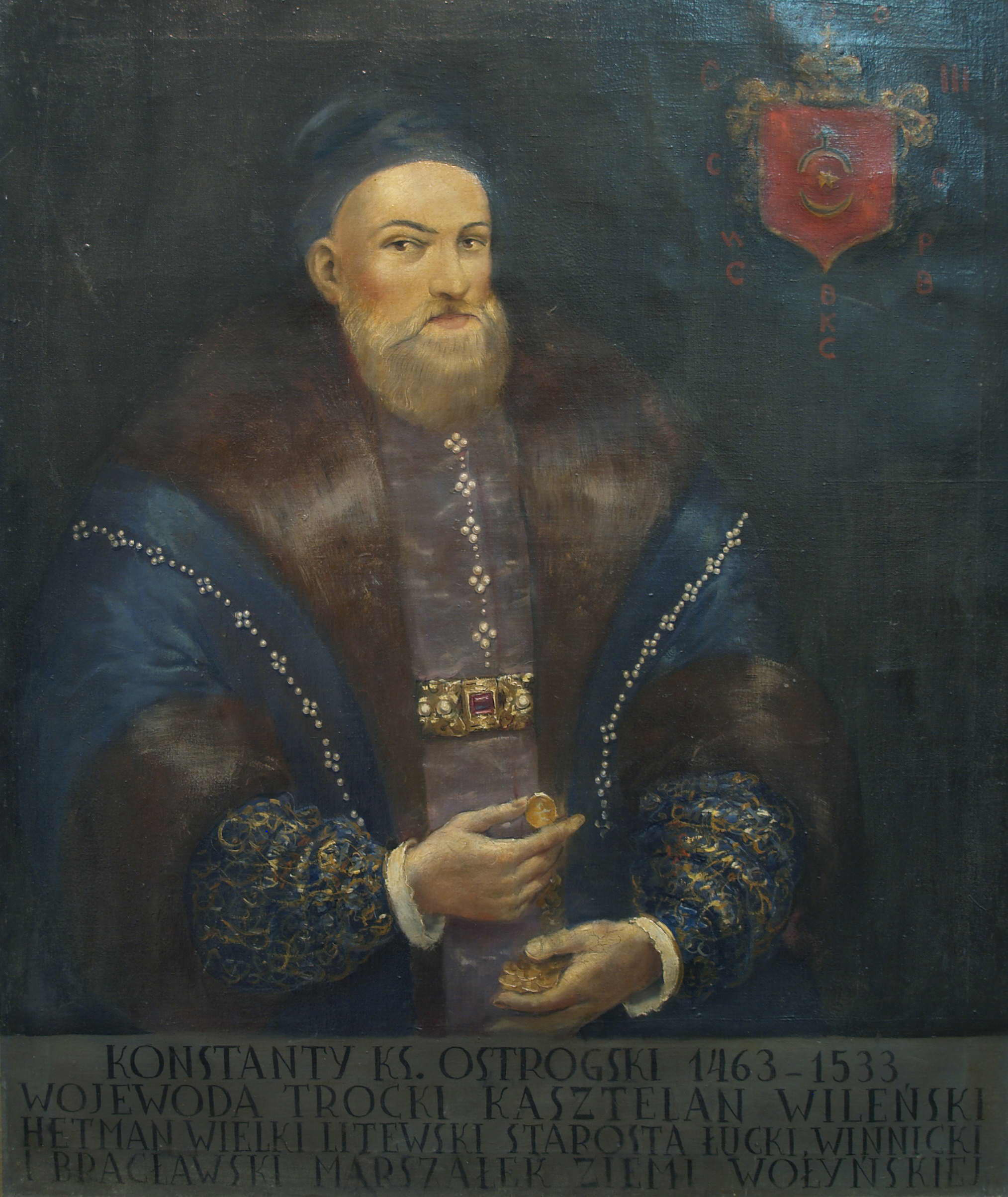
Portrait of Konstanty Wasyl Ostrogski

In 1596, at the synod in Brest, the majority of Orthodox hierarchs proclaimed the Union of Brest with the Latin Church. Prince Konstanty Wasyl Ostrogski supported the Nalyvaiko Uprising in an effort to prevent the implementation of the union. Although the majority of the faithful and clergy in Ruthenia remained Orthodox, the union gained significant support in the lands of the Grand Duchy of Lithuania and led to the effective delegalization of the Orthodox Church in the Commonwealth. The early 17th century was marked by persecution and continued struggle for legal recognition.

Although the Ruthenian nobility were formally granted equal rights within the Commonwealth by royal decrees, these provisions were often not enforced in practice. Both the nobility and urban populations experienced pressure to adopt Roman Catholicism and the Polish language, contributing to the gradual Polonization of elites. This process alienated them from the lower strata of Ruthenian society, particularly the Cossacks, who remained strongly attached to Orthodoxy and resistant to Catholic influence. Powerful magnate families of Ruthenian origin, including the Wiśniowiecki, Czartoryski, Ostrogski, Sanguszko, Zbaraski, Korecki, and Zasławski families, accumulated vast estates and played a significant role in the social and religious tensions of the period. These tensions were further exacerbated by economic practices such as estate leasing.

Local Orthodox traditions were also influenced by the growing authority of Moscow, especially after 1448, when the Grand Duchy of Moscow asserted de facto independence in ecclesiastical matters. Following the fall of Constantinople, Moscow increasingly claimed leadership within the Orthodox world, promoting the authority of the Metropolitan of Moscow and All Rus′.

Thanks to the military protection of the Zaporozhian Cossacks under Hetman Petro Konashevych-Sahaidachny in 1620–1621, the Patriarch of Jerusalem, Theophanes III of Jerusalem, restored the Orthodox hierarchy in the Grand Duchy of Lithuania and the Ruthenian lands of the Crown of the Kingdom of Poland, consecrating a new Metropolitan of Kiev, Job Boretsky. This act, however, was not recognized by the Commonwealth authorities.

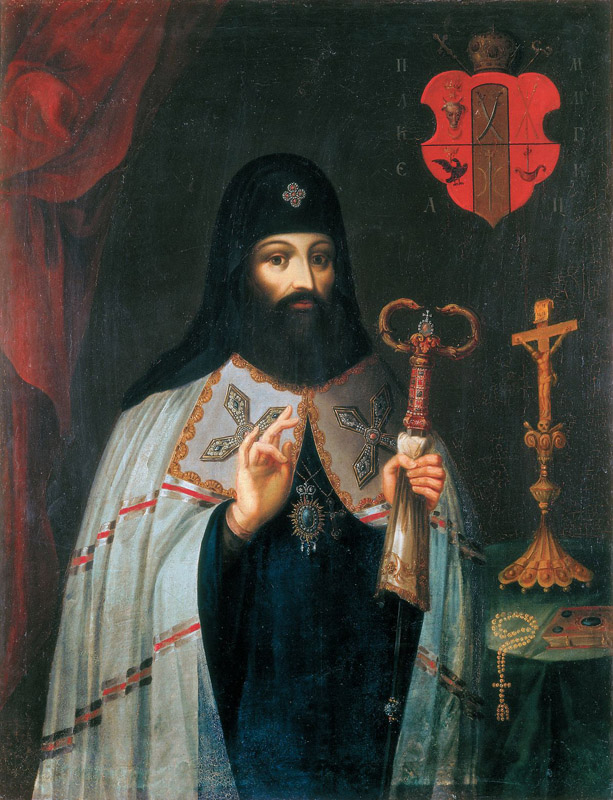
17th century portrait of metropolitan Petro Mohyla

A turning point came on 14 November 1632, when in the pacta conventa of Władysław IV Vasa the Orthodox hierarchy was officially recognized as equal to the Uniate one.

In 1648, the Khmelnytsky Uprising broke out under the leadership of Bohdan Khmelnytsky, becoming a major turning point in the history of the Orthodox Church in the Commonwealth. The conflict significantly altered the balance of power in the Ruthenian lands, weakening the position of the Uniate Church in several regions and temporarily strengthening Orthodox institutions under Cossack protection. At the same time, prolonged warfare led to widespread devastation, population displacement, and disruption of parish networks. In the longer term, the uprising contributed to political realignment, culminating in closer ties between the Cossack Hetmanate and the Tsardom of Russia, with lasting consequences for ecclesiastical jurisdiction.

In 1676, amid tensions during the Polish–Ottoman wars, the Sejm adopted legislation, at the initiative of John III Sobieski, prohibiting the Orthodox population of the Commonwealth from maintaining contact with the patriarchate in Constantinople. After the death of Metropolitan Joseph Tukalskyi-Nelyubovych, his successor travelled to Moscow in 1685 to receive confirmation, marking the transfer of jurisdiction to the Russian Orthodox Church. This arrangement was confirmed a year later by the Ecumenical Patriarchate of Constantinople. The Treaty of Perpetual Peace (1686) further placed Orthodox clergy under Moscow’s authority.

These developments—particularly the subordination of the Kiev Metropolis to Moscow and the resulting association of Orthodoxy with a foreign political power—led the authorities of the Commonwealth to support the Uniate Church as a more loyal alternative. As a result, the Union was imposed on a number of Orthodox dioceses, including Przemyśl (1692), Lviv (1700), and Lutsk (1707). By the late Commonwealth period, only one Orthodox diocese was officially recognized (Mogilev).

The issue of protecting non-Catholics appeared in Russo-Prussian treaties from 1732.

In 1771, Catherine the Great ordered the Imperial Russian Army to intervene in the Commonwealth. Following the First Partition of Poland, a large portion of the Orthodox population came under Russian rule.

At the end of the 18th century, attempts were made to establish an independent Orthodox Church. A congress in Pinsk (1791) proposed a structure independent of foreign ecclesiastical authority. The proposal was approved by the Sejm of the Polish–Lithuanian Commonwealth in 1792 as a constitutional act; however, the Polish–Russian War of 1792 and the subsequent partitions prevented its implementation.

=== Early period of Russian Orthodoxy: 1793–1905 ===
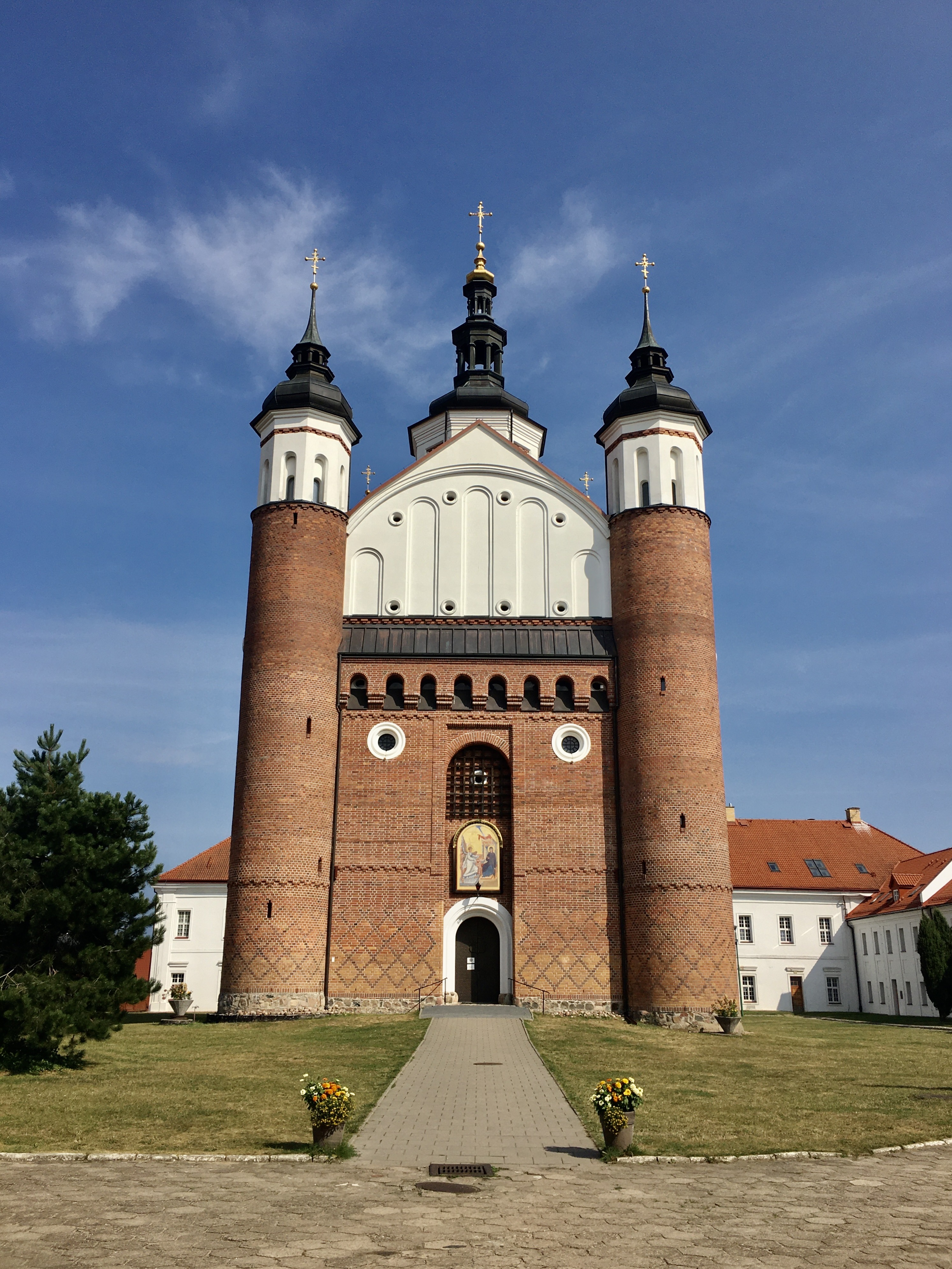
Supraśl Orthodox Monastery in Supraśl, founded by Aleksander Chodkiewicz

Following the partitions of Poland and the annexation of Polish territory by the Russian Empire, the administration of Eastern Orthodox communities was carried out by the vicar bishop of Pereyaslav and Boryspil of the Kyiv Eparchy with residence in Slutsk. The Eastern Orthodox population on the territory of modern Poland was very scarce at that time. In 1825 the administration was transferred to the bishop of Minsk and in 1827 – the bishop of Volhynia.

In 1834 the post of vicar bishop of Warsaw of the Volhynian eparchy was established. Establishment of the post was partially due to the 1830–31 Polish uprising (so called November Uprising). The idea to create the post came from the Namiestnik of Poland and Serence Prince of Warsaw Ivan Paskevich. By 1834 in Vistula Land, there were at least 6 parochial Orthodox temples and the Saint Onuphrius Monastery in Jabłeczna. The first bishop was Antoni (Rafalski) who was an archimandrite of the Pochaiv Lavra. The new vicar bishop was not only subordinated to the Volhynian eparchy, but also directly to the ober-procurator of the Holy Synod.

Starting since 1783, on territories that were annexed in 1793, there were established Minsk Eparchy, Bratslav Eparchy, and Izyaslav Eparchy. In 1839 there was established the eparchy of Wilno and Lithuania following the 1839 Synod of Polotsk which liquidated Uniate Church on territory of the Imperial Russia. In 1840, the former Warsaw vicariate was transformed into a separate eparchy of Warsaw covering the whole Congress of Poland.

Following the 1875 conversion of Chełm Eparchy (Eparchy of Chełm–Belz) of the Ruthenian Uniate Church, the Eparchy of Warsaw was renamed as Eparchy of Warsaw and Chełm, while Marcel Popiel who played a key role in the process was ordained as a vicar bishop of the merged diocese.

=== Transitional period: 1905–1924 ===
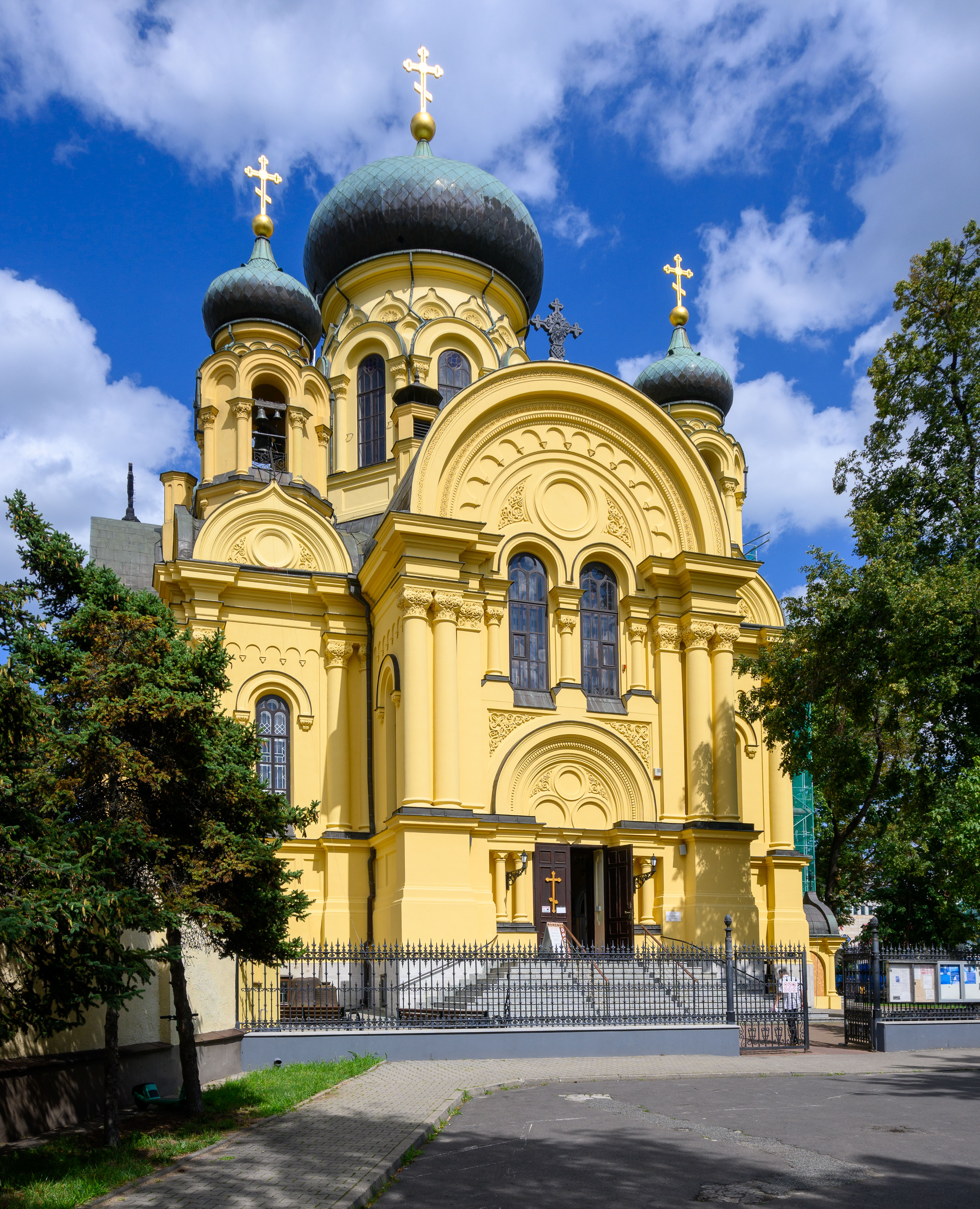
Cathedral of St. Mary Magdalene, Warsaw, the main Polish Orthodox Church

Following the 1905 revolution in the Imperial Russia, Tsar issued the manifest "On strengthening the principles of religious tolerance" which gave start to revival of Catholicism. Several parishes en masse were switching back to the Uniate Church.

With start of the World War I, in 1915 the Russian Church in Poland was evacuated along with the Russian administration. On territory of what it was "Warsaw Eparchy" remained about 10 priests. The last archbishop of Warsaw Nicholas (Ziorov) died soon after evacuation and during the remaining time of World War I, the diocese was vacant.

Following the 1917–18 Local Council of the Russian Orthodox Church, Patriarch Tikhon of Moscow finally appointed a new bishop to the eparchy of Warsaw who was Seraphim (Chichagov). Seraphim (Chichagov) was never able to actually arrive to his appointed diocese due to unstable situation. To fix that in September 1921, the Archbishop of Minsk George (Yaroshevsky) was appointed as Patriarchal Exarch in Poland.

=== First period of the autocephalous church: 1924–1939 ===
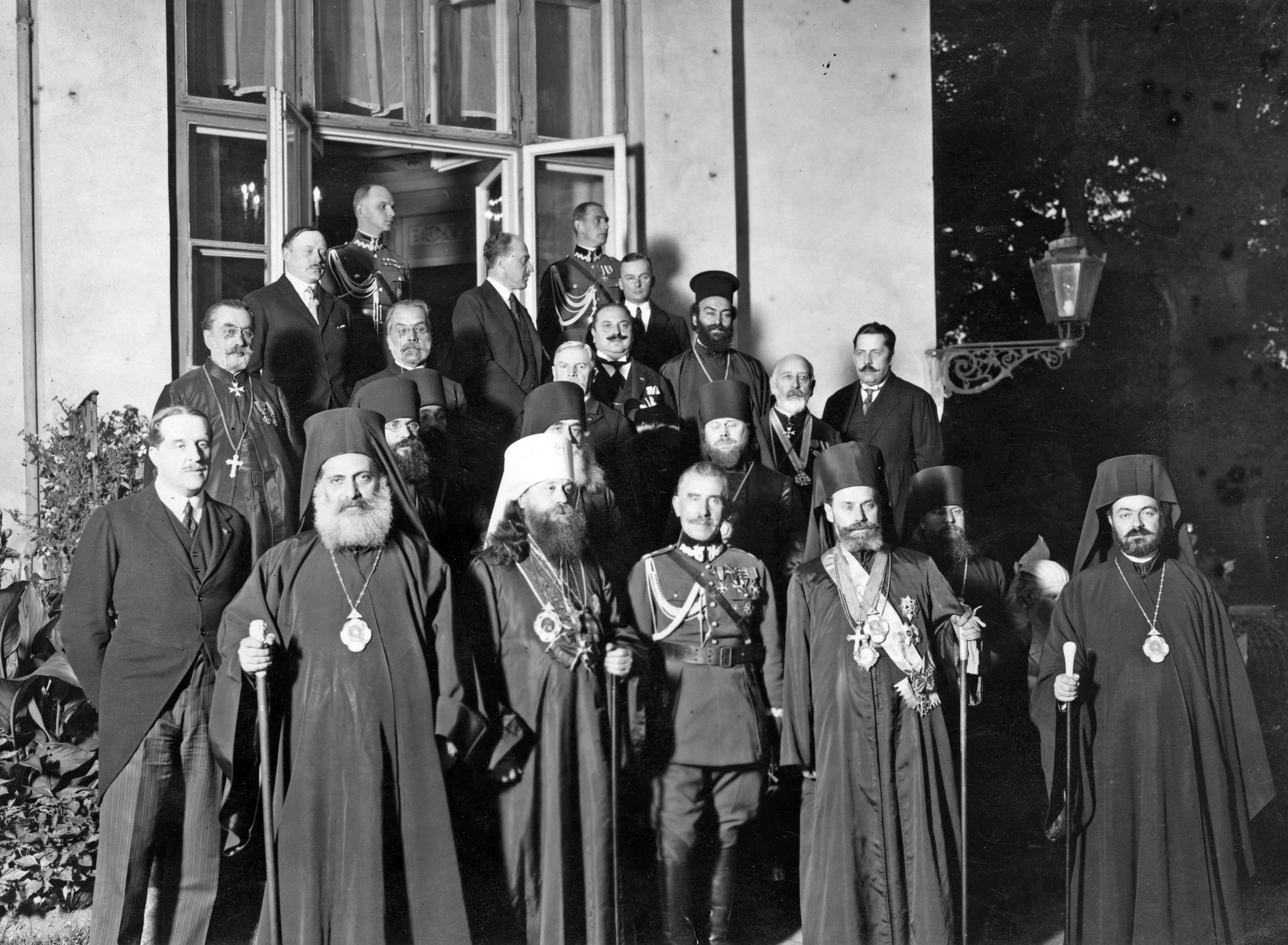
Delegates of the Polish Orthodox Church and the Ecumenical Patriarchate of Constantinople in front of the Belweder Palace on the day of the proclamation of autocephaly of the Orthodox Church in Poland, 1925.

The church was established in 1924 after Poland regained independence, as the Second Polish Republic, following World War I in 1918. After the Polish–Soviet War and the Treaty of Riga of 1921, Poland secured control of a sizeable portion of its former eastern territories previously lost in the late-18th-century Partitions of Poland to the Russian Empire. Eastern Orthodoxy was widespread in the eastern provinces of interwar Poland. The loss of an ecclesiastical link, due to the persecution of the Russian Orthodox Church in the Soviet Union, left the regional clergy in a crisis, and in 1924 the Ecumenical Patriarchate took over, establishing several autonomous churches on territories of the new states that were formerly wholly or partially part of the Russian Empire: Finland, the Baltic states, and Poland. In 1922 a conflict ensued due intervention of the Russian Orthodox Church that approved appointment of bishops in Poland without agreement from Metropolitan of Warsaw George (Yaroshevsky). The conflict was led by the Bishop Eleutherius (Bogoyavlensky) of Wilno and Lida. Several diocesan bishops along with Eleutherius of Wilno including Panteleimon (Rozhnovsky), Vladimir (Tikhonitsky) and others took stance against seeking autocephalous status for the Orthodox Church in Poland. Most of them were expelled from Poland. Bishops Eleutherius and Vladimir were also against ordination of Alexander (Inozemtsev) who was ordained as a vicar bishop of Lublin by George (Yaroshevsky) and Dionizy (Waledyński) on 4 June 1922.

Earlier, in January 1922, the Polish government had issued an order recognizing the Orthodox church and placing it under the authority of the state. At that time a Ukrainian, George (Yaroshevsky), was appointed Metropolitan and exarch by the patriarch of Moscow. When Yaroshevsky began to reject the authority of Moscow Patriarchate, he was assassinated by a Russian monk. Nonetheless, his successor, Dionizy (Waledyński), continued to work for the autocephaly of the Polish Orthodox church, which was finally granted by the Ecumenical Patriarch of Constantinople in his Tomos of 13 November 1924. The Russian Orthodox Church at the time did not recognise Constantinople's granting of Polish autocephaly. Most of the parishioners were Ukrainians and Belarusians living in the eastern areas of the newly independent Polish Second Republic.

During the interwar period, however, the Polish authorities imposed severe restrictions on the church and its clergy. In the most famous example, the Alexander Nevsky Cathedral in Warsaw was destroyed in the mid-1920s. In Volhynia a total of 190 Eastern Orthodox churches were destroyed and a further 150 converted to Catholicism. Several court hearings against the Pochaiv Lavra also took place.

=== World War II: 1939–1944 ===
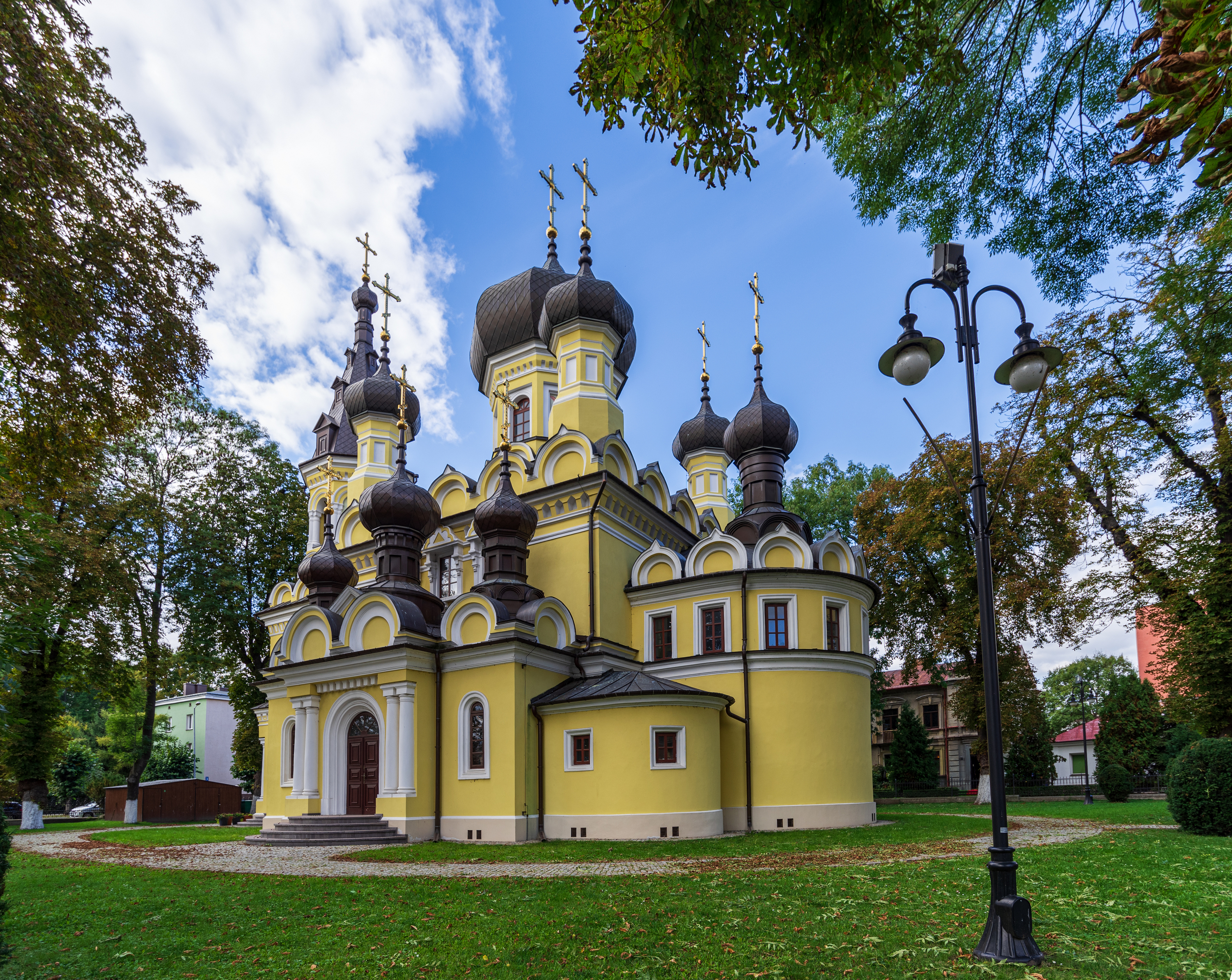
Church of the Dormition of the Mother of God, Hrubieszów

Following the start of the World War II on 1 September 1939 and the Soviet invasion of Poland on 17 September 1939, Poland was divided between the Nazi Germany and the Soviet Union. For support of resistance against the Nazi Germany, the Metropolitan Dionisius was arrested, while the Church territories (dioceses) were mostly taken over by the Moscow Patriarchate and the rest were transferred under temporary administration by the Metropolitan of Berlin Seraphim (Lade) of the ROCOR, who also was assisted by Vasily (Pavlovsky). At the end of 1940, Metropolitan Dionisius signed a loyalty declaration for the General Governor of Poland Hans Frank and was released from his arrest. On 30 September 1940 the Bishop Council of the Polish Orthodox Church led by Metropolitan Dionisius reformed the Church considering the new realities and constituted new dioceses which were 3: Diocese of Warschau and Radom, Diocese of Cholm and Podlachia, Diocese of Krakau and Lemkos. On territories that became part of the Reichskommissariat Ukraine, there was established separate "Orthodox Autocephalous Church on liberated territory of Ukraine" under auspices of the Polish Orthodox Church led by Polycarp (Sikorsky), a vicar bishop of Lutsk. Along with Alexander (Inozemtsev), Polycarp (Sikorsky) started to develop what later would be known as the Ukrainian Autocephalous Orthodox Church.

Another member of the Polish Orthodox Church clergy, Archbishop Alexiy (Hromadsky) in Pochaiv Lavra created in August 1941 an opposition organization, loyal to the Moscow Patriarchate, known as Ukrainian Autonomous Orthodox Church.

=== Since 1945 ===
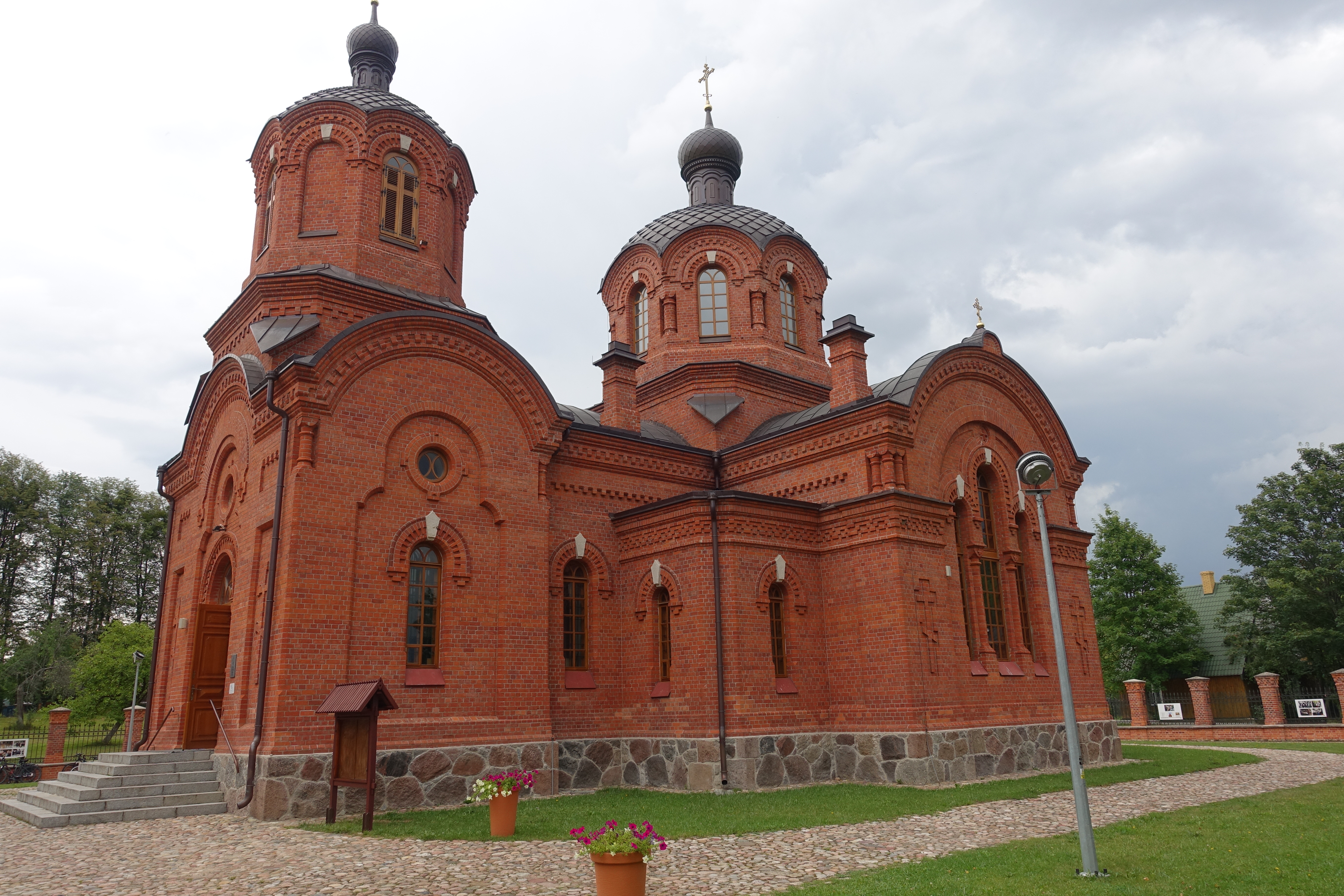
St. Nicholas Church in Białowieża

After the Second World War, the pre-war eastern territories of Poland were annexed by the Soviet Union and included within the Lithuanian, Byelorussian and Ukrainian SSRs. The annexed territories contained up to 80% of the PAOC's parishes and congregation, which were united with the recently re-instated Moscow Patriarchate. The remaining parishes that were now on the territory of the Polish People's Republic were kept by the PAOC, including most of the mixed easternmost territories such as around Chełm and Białystok. In 1948, after the Soviet Union established political control over Poland, the Russian Orthodox Church recognised the autocephalous status of the Polish Orthodox Church.

Although most of the congregation is historically centered in the Eastern borderland regions with considerable Belarusian and Ukrainian minorities, there are now many parishes across the country, as a result of Operation Vistula and other diaspora movements. There are also some adherents in Brazil, resulting from the 1989 canonical union between the hierarchy headed by Metropolitan Gabriel of Lisbon, formerly under the Church of the Genuine Orthodox Christians of Greece, and the Polish Orthodox Church. The European bishops, however, have left the jurisdiction in 2000, which eventually resulted in senior Bishop Chrysostom being raised to archepiscopal dignity. There are now parishes in the states of Rio de Janeiro, Pernambuco and Paraíba, plus a mission in Ceará and a monastery in João Pessoa.

In 2003, following the decision of the Holy Sobor of Bishops of the Polish Autocephalous Orthodox Church, the New Martyrs of Chelm and Podlasie suffering persecution during the 1940s were canonized.

In 2025, the Holy Sobor of Bishops of the Polish Autocephalous Orthodox Church decided to canonise the Katyn Martyrs, including military chaplains Simon Fedorońko, Victor Romanowski, Vladimir Ochab, and all other Orthodox Christians martyred during the Katyn massacre.

== Primates of the church ==
The Polish Autocephalous Orthodox Church was established in 1924. Traditionally the primate of the church has the title Metropolitan of Warsaw and All Poland.

- Metropolitan George (Grzegorz Jaroszewski) – Metropolitan of Warsaw (1921–1923), Russian Patriarchal Exarch in Poland (Predecessor for establishment of the structure of Polish Autocephalous Orthodox Church)
- Metropolitan Dionysius (Konstanty Waledyński) – Metropolitan of Warsaw and All Poland (1923–1948)
  - locum tenens Timothy (Szretter) (1948–1951)
- Metropolitan Macarius (Michał Oksijuk) – Metropolitan of Warsaw and All Poland (1951–1959)
- Metropolitan Timotheus (Jerzy Szretter) – Metropolitan of Warsaw and All Poland (1961–1962)
  - locum tenens George (Korenistov) (1962–1965)
- Metropolitan Stephan (Stepan Rudyk) – Metropolitan of Warsaw and All Poland (1965–1969)
  - locum tenens George (Korenistov) (1969–1970)
- Metropolitan Basil (Włodzimierz Doroszkiewicz) – Metropolitan of Warsaw and All Poland (1970–1998)
- Metropolitan Sabbas (Michał Hrycuniak) – Metropolitan of Warsaw and All Poland (1998–present)

== Administration ==
Polish Orthodox Cathedrals (examples)

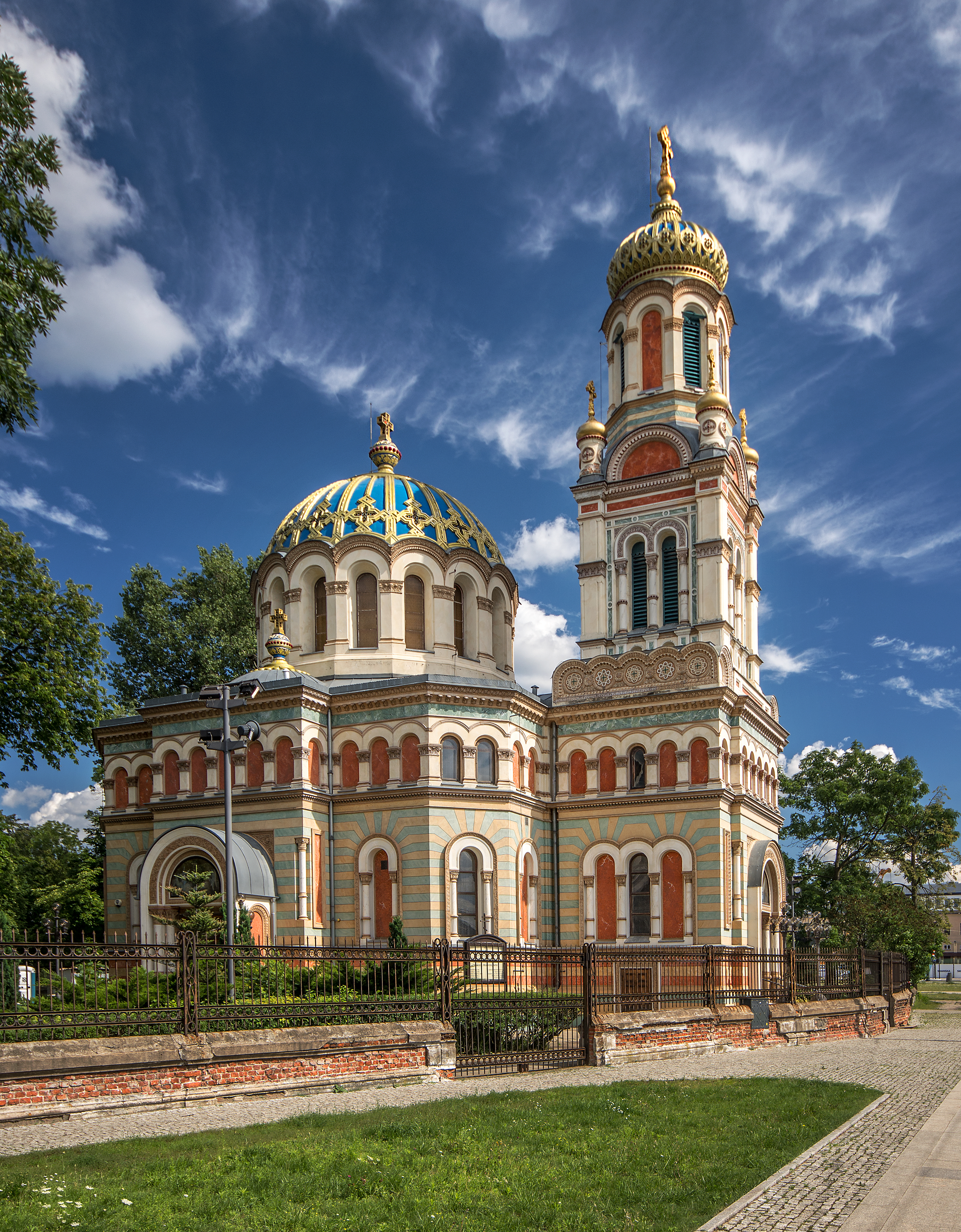
Alexander Nevsky Cathedral, Łódź

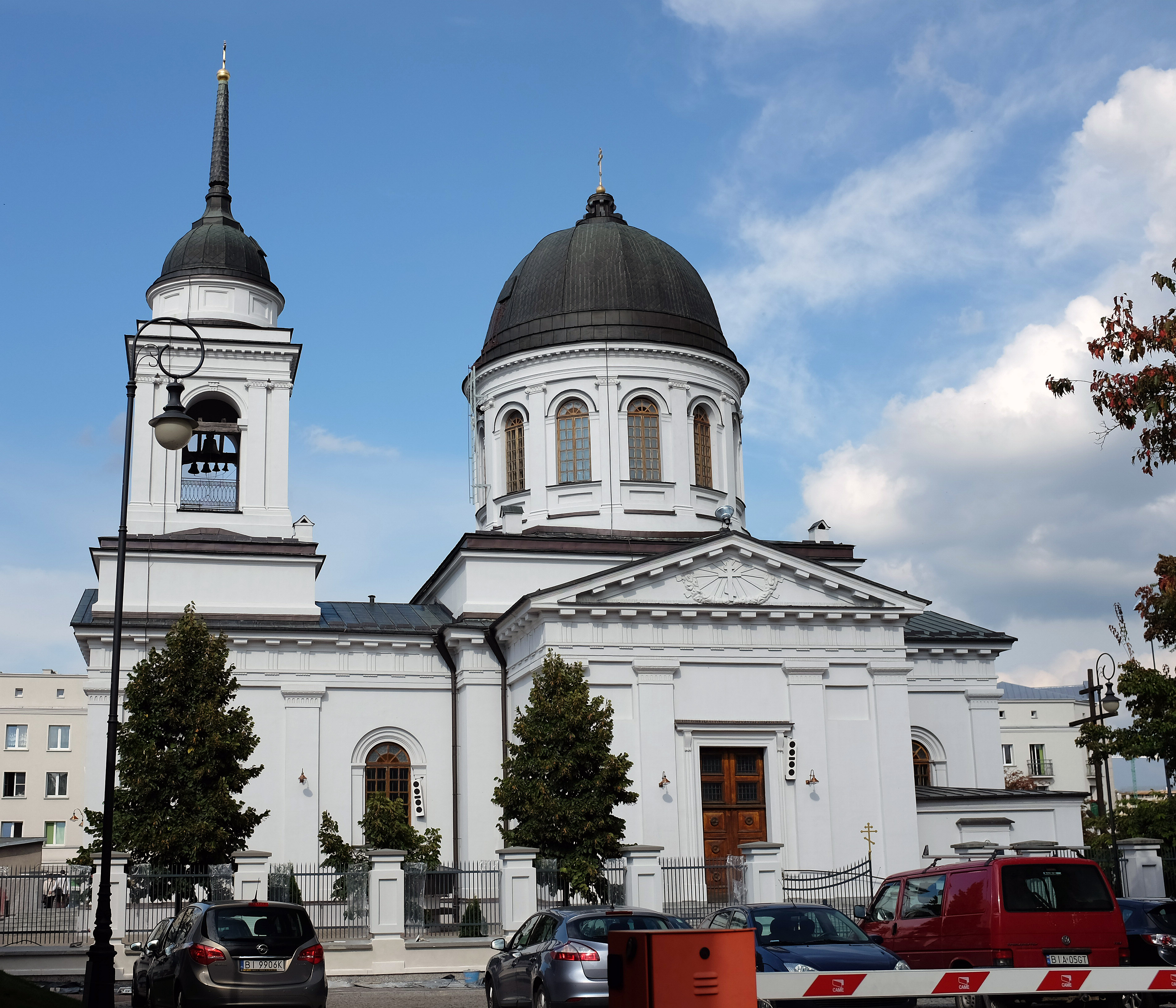
Saint Nicholas Cathedral, Białystok

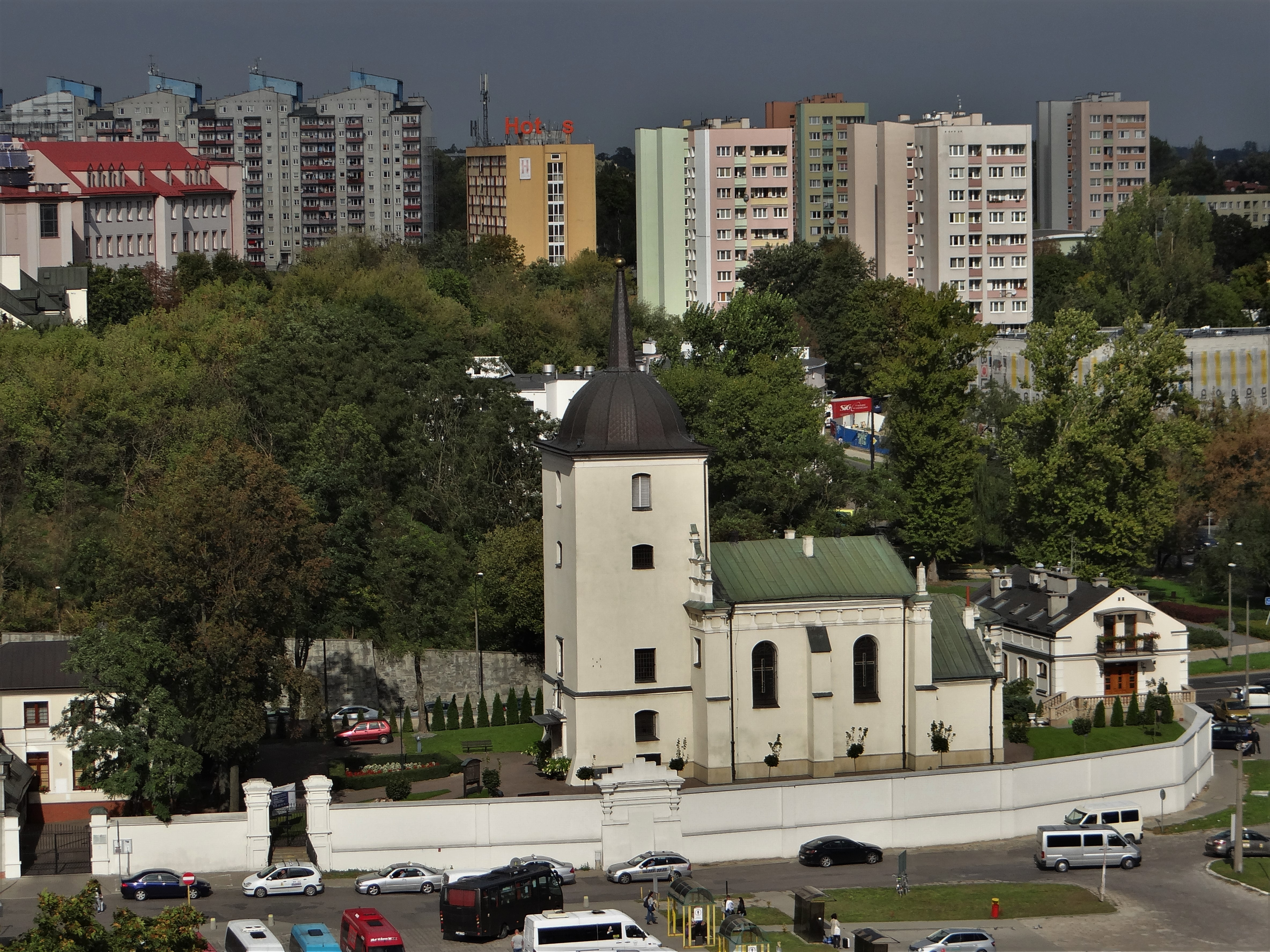
Cathedral of the Transfiguration, Lublin

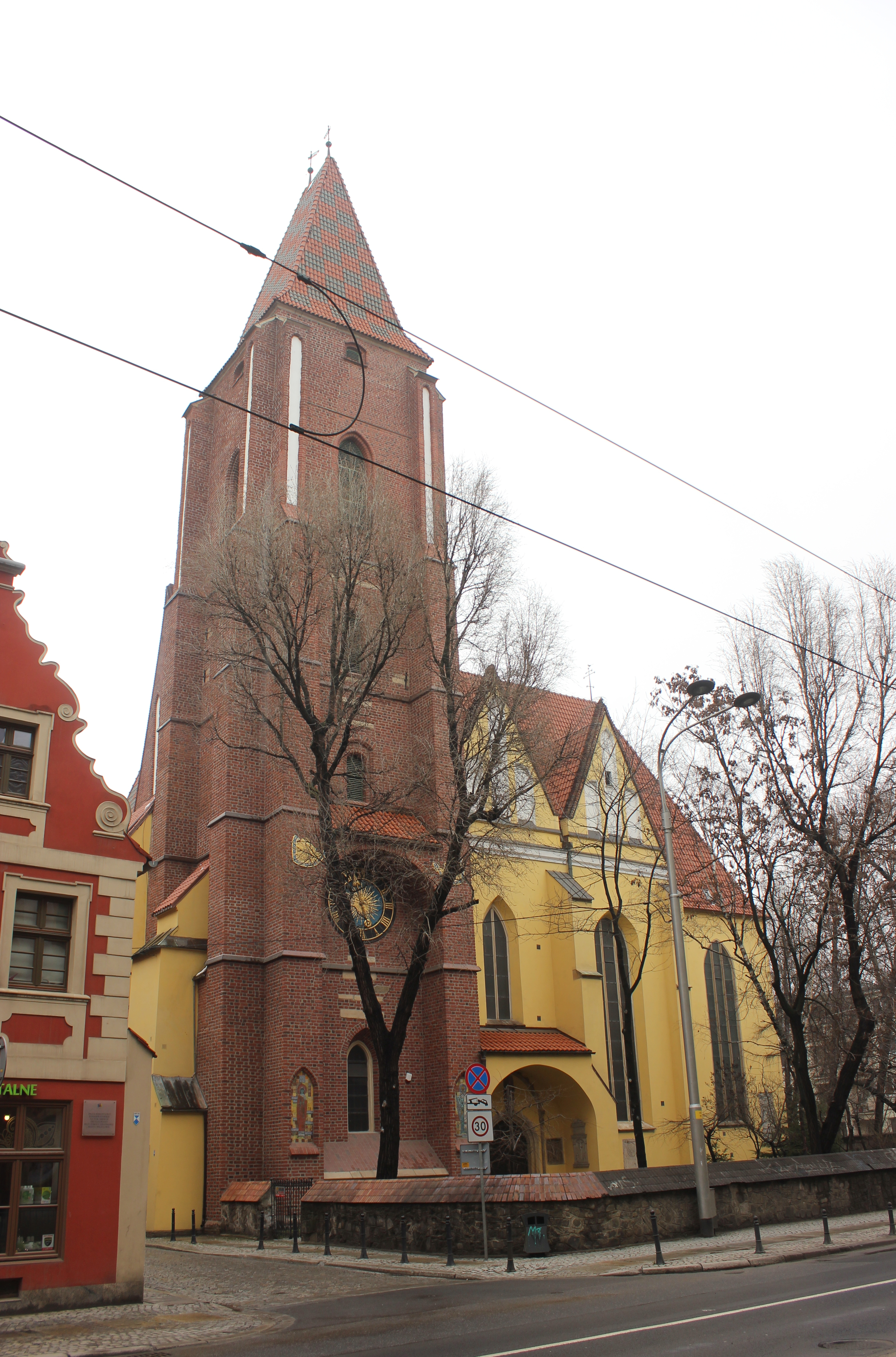
Cathedral of the Nativity of the Virgin Mary, Wrocław

The church is headed by the Archbishop of Warsaw and Metropolitan of All Poland: Sawa (Michał) Hrycuniak (1998–). It is divided into the following dioceses:

=== Archdioceses and archbishops ===
- Archdiocese of Warsaw and Bielsk: Sawa (Hrycuniak)
- Archdiocese of Białystok and Gdańsk: Jakub (Kostiuczuk) (2008–)
- Archdiocese of Łódź and Poznań: Atanazy (Nos) (2017–)
- Archdiocese of Wrocław and Szczecin: George (Pańkowski) (2017–)
- Archdiocese of Lublin and Chełm: Abel (Popławski) (2001–)
- Archdiocese of Przemyśl and Gorlice: Paisius (Martyniuk) (2016–)
- Archdiocese of Rio de Janeiro and Olinda-Recife: Chrysostom (Freire) (1992–)
- Diocese of Recife: Ambrose (Cubas) (1996–)

=== Titular dioceses and bishops ===
- Titular Diocese of Supraśl: Gregory (Charkiewicz) (2008–), Vicar Bishop for Białystok and Gdańsk
- Titular Diocese of Siemiatycze: George (Mariusz) Pańkowski (2007–), Ordinary for the Polish Orthodox Military Ordinariate and Vicar Bishop for Warsaw and Bielsk

=== Other entities ===
- Polish Orthodox Military Ordinariate

=== Original dioceses ===
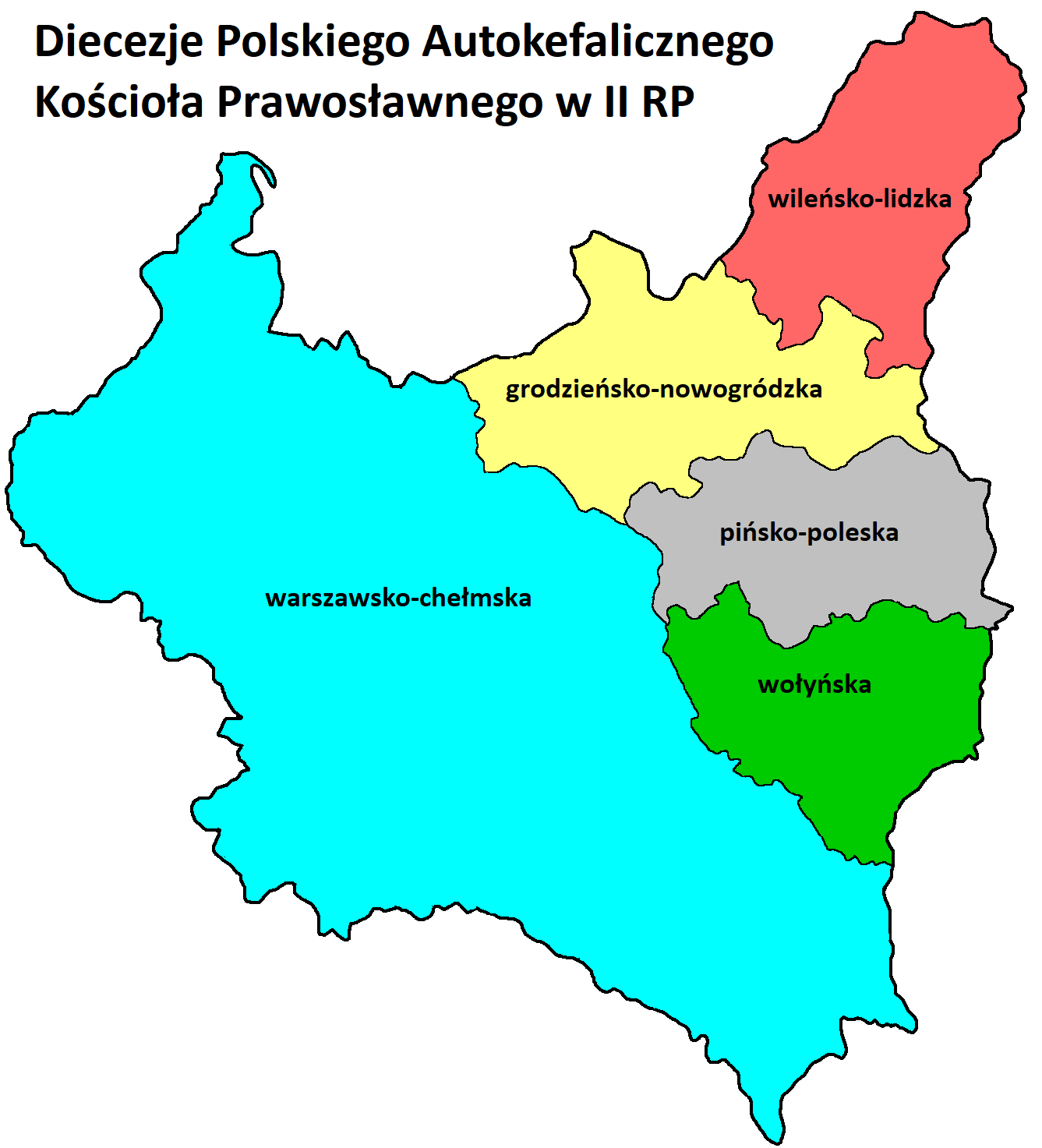
Dioceses of the church before the World War II

Dioceses and bishops upon the issue of the tomos in 1924

- Diocese of Warsaw and Chełm (ruling): Dionizy (Waledyński)
  - vicar of Lublin: Alexander (Inozemtsev)
- Diocese of Wołyń: Dionizy (Waledyński)
- Diocese of Grodno and Nowogródek: Aleksiy (Hromadsky)
- Diocese of Pinsk and Polesie
- Diocese of Wilna and Lida: Theodosius (Feodosiev)

Following the Soviet invasion of Poland, most of dioceses except for Warsaw were annexed by the Moscow Patriarchate as so called Western Exarchate centered in Lutsk. Dionizy (Waledyński) was arrested by the Nazi authorities and was placed under arrest. The rest of territories were given to administration of Seraphim (Lade) of the ROCOR, who also was assisted by Vasily (Pavlovsky).

== See also ==
- Religion in Poland
- Catholic Church in Poland
- Protestantism in Poland
- Union of Brest
- Revindication of Orthodox churches in the Second Polish Republic
- Destruction of Ukrainian Orthodox Churches in Eastern Poland
- Warsaw Icon Museum
- Church of St. Nicholas, Zabłocie
- Saints Peter and Paul Church, Siematycze
- St. John Climacus's Orthodox Church, Warsaw
- St. Barbara's Church, Milejczyce

== Bibliography ==
- Bozhko, Mitrophan (2025). "Autocephaly of the Church of Poland in the Context of the Ukrainian Church Movement (1921–1944)". Proceedings of the Kyiv Theological Academy (in Ukrainian) (43). Kyiv: Kyiv Theological Academy and Seminary: 157–187.
