= Chrysostom Muniz Freire =

Brazilian Orthodox bishop

Chrysostom (Muniz Freire)
- Archbishop of Rio de Janeiro and Olinda-Recife
- Church: Polish Orthodox Church
- Elected: 1997

Orders
- Ordination: 1987
- Consecration: 1991

Archbishop Dom Chrysostom (Portuguese: Dom Chrisóstomo ['dõ kɾi'zɔstomu]), born Luiz Felipe Muniz Freire, is a Brazilian Orthodox bishop, titled Archbishop of Rio de Janeiro and Olinda-Recife under the Polish Orthodox Church.

As a young member of a group of spiritual seekers, he found Orthodoxy through Metropolitan Gabriel (Rocha) of Lisbon, who baptised him and other seekers on the Feast of Pentecost, 1986. In February 1987, he was ordained a priest into the Church of the Genuine Orthodox Christians of Greece, although the Lisbon Metropolis separated from this very jurisdiction on the same year, signing a union protocol with the Polish Orthodox Church two years later. In 1991, after a period in a monastery in Mafra and already ordained an Archimandrite, he was consecrated, in Grabarka, a residential bishop for Brazil. In the following year, Chrysostom was consecrated, in the Diocese of Rio de Janeiro and Olinda-Recife, the first Orthodox bishop native to his country. Between the years of 2000 and 2001, a canonical crisis elevated his Diocese to the archdiocesan status after splitting it from the Lisbon Archdiocese, but not from the Church of Poland.

Archbishop Chrysostom's episcopal see lies in the Most Holy Virgin Mary Cathedral, in Copacabana, with Bishop Dom Ambrose (Cubas) of Recife, parishes in the states of Rio de Janeiro, Pernambuco and Paraíba, plus a mission in the state of Ceará and a monastery in João Pessoa under his omophorion.
