= Cathedral of the Transfiguration, Lublin =

Orthodox cathedral in Lublin, Poland

Cathedral of the Transfiguration
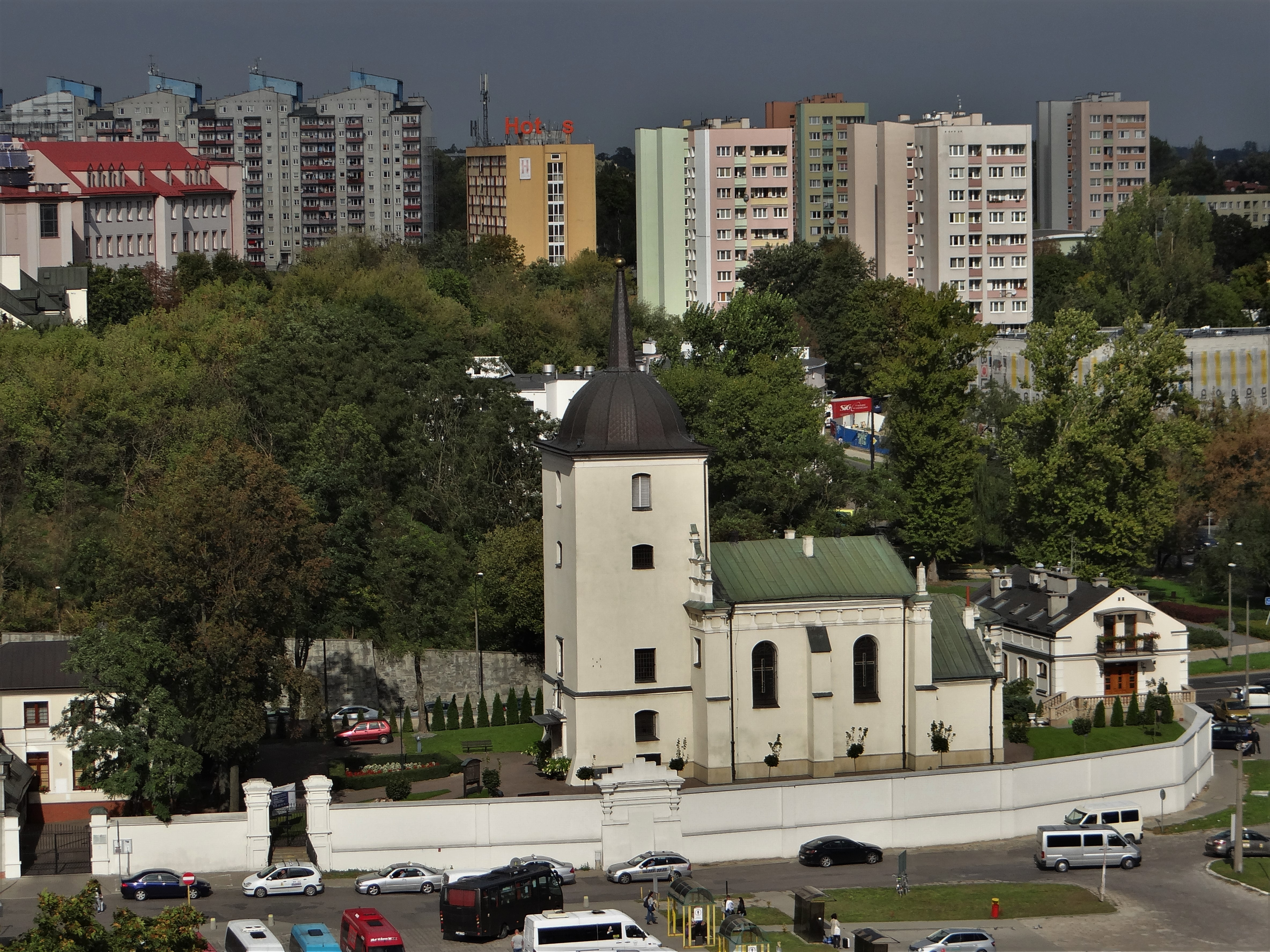
- Cathedral of the Transfiguration
- 51°15′08.1″N 22°34′25.9″E
- Location: Lublin
- Country: Poland
- Denomination: Eastern Orthodoxy
- Churchmanship: Polish Orthodox Church

History
- Status: active Orthodox cathedral
- Dedication: Transfiguration of Jesus
- Dedicated: March 15, 1633

Architecture
- Style: Renaissance
- Years built: 1607–1633

Specifications
- Materials: brick

Administration
- Diocese: Diocese of Lublin and Chełm

Cathedral of the Transfiguration is an Orthodox cathedral in Lublin, and the main church of the Diocese of Lublin and Chełm of the Polish Orthodox Church. It also serves as the seat of the Lublin Parish of the Transfiguration (in the Lublin Deanery). The cathedral is located on Ruska Street.

The currently existing building was constructed between 1607 and 1633 on the site of two older churches. It was dedicated in 1633 by Metropolitan Petro Mohyla of Kyiv. During construction and for several decades afterwards, the church's ownership was fiercely contested between the Orthodox and the Uniates, who finally took permanent control of the building in 1695. The Lublin parish returned to the Orthodox church in 1875, following the abolition of the Uniate Eparchy of Chełm by the tsarist administration and military.

The cathedral is particularly revered for housing copies of the Jerusalem and Lublin icons of the Mother of God.

The temple was registered as a historical monument on 21 January 1960 and 21 February 1967 under number A/227.

== History ==
=== First Orthodox churches in Lublin ===
Historical sources do not definitively indicate when the first Orthodox church in Lublin was established. In the chronicle of Wincenty Kadłubek, there is mention of Lublin being taken over by Daniel of Galicia, who supposedly built a castle and an Orthodox church there. However, some historians question Daniel's presence in Lublin. A document from 1390 references the murder of two women from Kolechowice on their way to the "schismatic Feast of the Savior" (i.e., the Orthodox Feast of the Transfiguration) in Lublin. This suggests the existence of a well-known church in the city dedicated to this feast. The authenticity of this document is also disputed. Historians Grzegorz Kuprianowicz and Mikołaj Roszczenko emphasize that the Orthodox Chełm Eparchy, established in 1240, would not have been created without an existing network of Orthodox parishes in the region.

In 1825, Uniate Bishop of Chełm, Filip Felicjan Szumborski, claimed (without citing his sources) that the Church of the Savior (i.e., the Transfiguration of Jesus) at Słomiany Market was founded by Princess Maria Ivanovna of Kyiv in 1447. According to Kuprianowicz and Roszczenko, the church must have existed earlier, as a preserved text of a donation by Jurij Czartoryjski refers to the church as founded and built in ancient times. Krzysztof Grzesiak generally states that the oldest Orthodox church in Lublin, located where the current cathedral stands, was built in the 14th century.

There is no doubt about the existence of an Orthodox parish in Lublin in the 16th century, which used the church located at the site of the current cathedral. The temple's chronicle also mentions the construction of an Orthodox monastery near the church between 1560 and 1573.

=== Orthodox-Uniate conflict over the church in Lublin ===
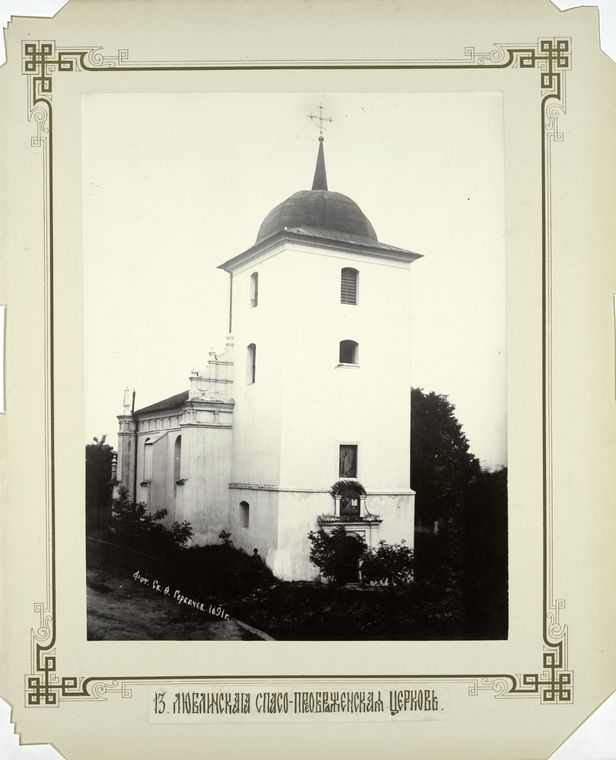
View of the cathedral from 1891

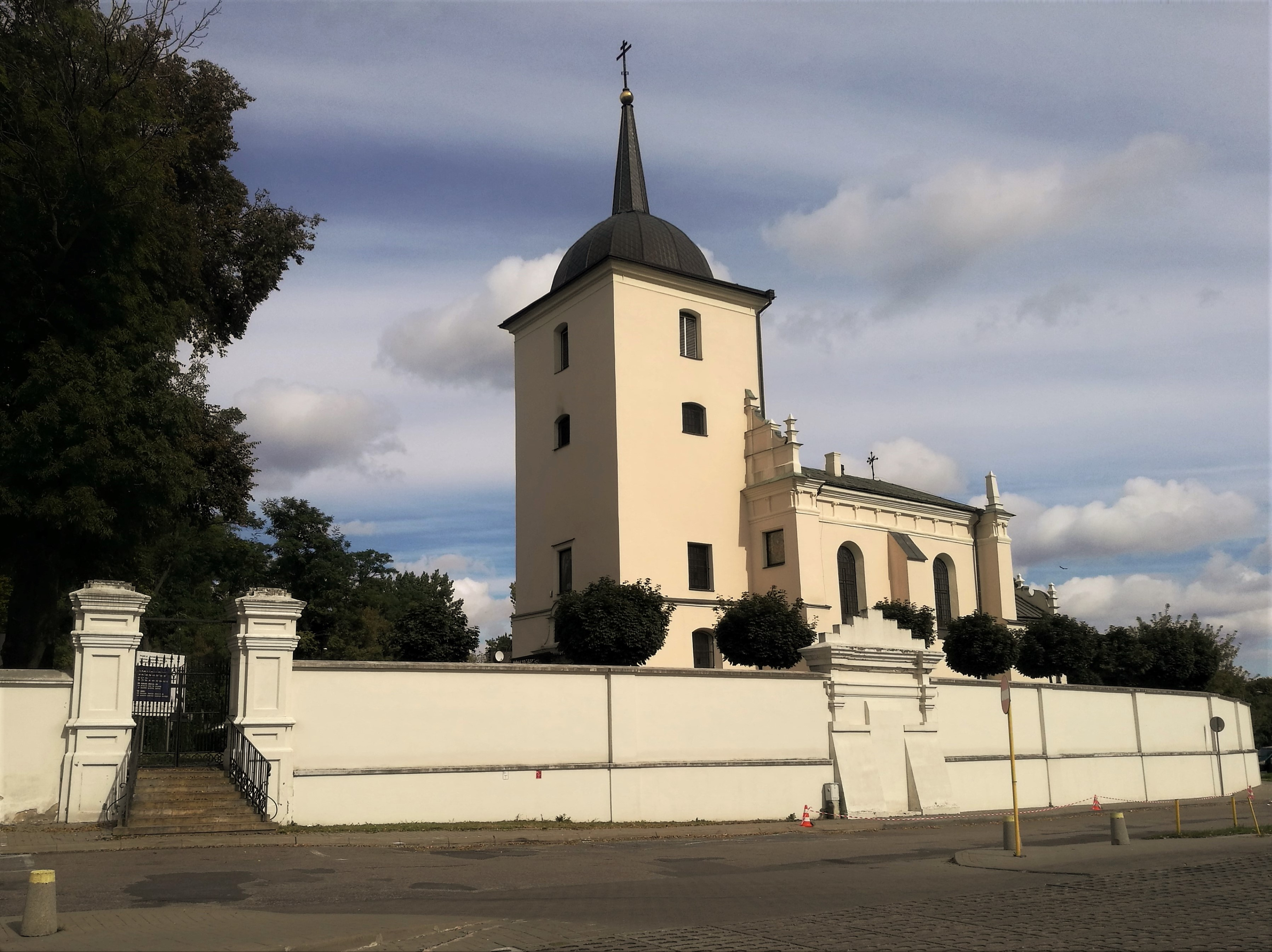
General view of the cathedral

In 1586, a church brotherhood was established at the Parish of the Transfiguration in Lublin, with Saint Onuphrius as its patron. The brotherhood included members from prominent Orthodox families in the Polish–Lithuanian Commonwealth, and its foundation was endorsed by the Patriarch of Antioch. A year later, the brotherhood began constructing a new church after the previous one burned down, salvaging only the iconostasis. The exact date of the new church's completion is unclear, but it was likely dedicated in the early 17th century. However, the structure deteriorated, prompting the brotherhood to start building another, this time a masonry church, in 1607. The construction took 26 years, likely due to the ongoing conflict between the Orthodox brotherhood and the Uniate hierarchy, as the Bishop of Chełm, Dionysius, supported the Union of Brest in 1596, theoretically converting the entire diocese to the Eastern Catholic Church. The ownership of the Church of the Transfiguration was a contentious issue, leading to several court cases in the Lublin tribunal. The Orthodox side was represented by the brotherhood, supported by the Orthodox Metropolitan of Kyiv, Job, and the Orthodox Bishop of Chełm, Paisius.

In 1633, the newly elected King of Poland, Władysław IV Vasa, legalized the functioning of the Orthodox Church in the country and confirmed several rights for its followers, including two decrees concerning the church in Lublin. The king pledged personal protection over the Orthodox church and agreed to exclude it from the jurisdiction of the Uniate Bishops of Chełm. That same year, Metropolitan Petro Mohyla of Kyiv dedicated the church on 15 March 1633 during a journey from Kraków to Kyiv. Despite the king's declarations, the Uniates forcibly took control of the church and its associated monastery in 1635, a takeover that was legalized by a new royal decree in 1638. Protests by Orthodox nobles at regional assemblies led the king to order the return of the church to the Orthodox brotherhood in 1639, which was implemented the following year. However, in 1645, the church was once again under Uniate control. The church was supposed to be returned to the Orthodox following the Treaty of Zboriv in 1649 but was again taken over by the Uniates in 1658. The church finally returned to Orthodox hands after the Treaty of Hadiach, but the Orthodox presence in Lublin dwindled due to the Polonization of the local Ruthenian nobility. The number of brotherhood members and their influence declined, leading to the parish and monastery in Lublin formally joining the Union in 1695. The few remaining Orthodox believers attended the Church of St. Josaphat, built in 1785 for the Greek merchant community.

The appearance of the Church of the Transfiguration in Lublin, along with the Dormition Church in Lviv, served as inspiration for the builders of the Lutsk Orthodox Fellowship of the True Cross.

=== Uniate church ===
After the final takeover by the Uniates, the Church of the Transfiguration in Lublin retained its status as a parish church, and the associated monastery became part of the Basilian Order. During this period, significant changes were made to the church's interior, reflecting the Latinization and Polonization trends within the Uniate Church. New elements, such as organs and bells, were introduced, side altars were installed, and sermons were delivered in Polish.

=== Reoccupation of the church by the Orthodox ===
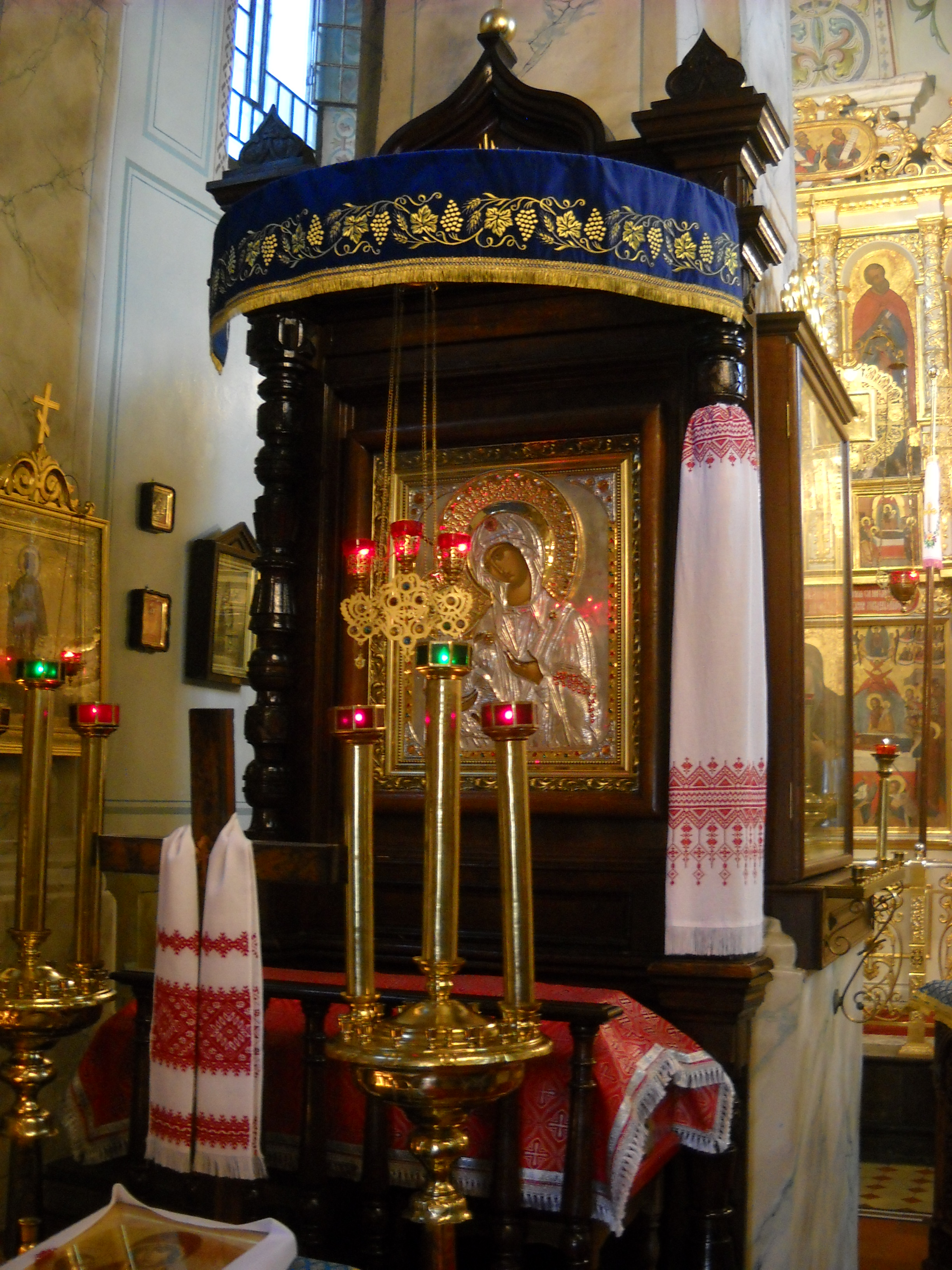
Copy of the Jerusalem Icon of the Mother of God

After 1864, as part of preparations to dissolve the Uniate Chełm Eparchy (which was part of the repressions following the suppression of the January Uprising), the Tsarist authorities allowed Uniate clergy from Galicia, who were participants in the ritualistic movement and sympathizers of the Russophile movement, to take up pastoral work in the diocese. Their mission was to gradually remove Latin elements from Uniate rituals and churches, to facilitate the eventual conversion of the Uniates to Orthodoxy.

The Lublin parish was taken over by a priest from near Lviv, Father Mikołaj Kolenkowski. During his tenure, the church underwent renovations to remove distinctly Latin elements. He also gradually introduced rituals similar to those used in the Russian Orthodox Church. The final dissolution of the Union in Lublin occurred on 11 May 1875. At that time, the reestablished Orthodox parish had 80 members, primarily Russian immigrants. A few years later, after the construction of the Church of the Exaltation of the Holy Cross in Lublin, the Lublin governor suggested the dissolution of the parish, but this was opposed by Bishop Modest of Lublin. A new Orthodox brotherhood of the Transfiguration was established at the church.

In 1881, a comprehensive renovation of the building was carried out (funded by Tsar Alexander II), removing the last elements foreign to the tradition of the Russian Orthodox Church. During the renovation, the design was somewhat carelessly based on patterns from Konstantin Thon's Projects of Churches. In subsequent decades (until the Russians withdrew from Lublin), the church received gifts from Patriarch Damian I of Jerusalem and Metropolitan Philotheus of Kyiv. The first of these hierarchs presented the Church of the Transfiguration with a copy of the Jerusalem Icon of the Mother of God, along with a fragment of the True Cross placed at the Church of the Holy Sepulchre.

At the beginning of the 20th century, despite the renovations carried out a few years earlier, the church was in such poor condition that a new renovation was necessary. At the initiative of Bishop Hieronymus of Warsaw, heaters were installed, the floor was replaced, the iconostasis was gilded, and the exterior stucco was restored and embellished.

In 1915, the Russian population of Lublin embarked on a mass immigration. Those leaving the city took with them the church's miraculous icons, a Gospel book, eight bells, and part of the furnishings. These were moved to the Chudov Monastery in Moscow, and after the monastery was destroyed in the late 1920s, they were lost without a trace.

=== Interwar period and World War II ===
The first Orthodox priest returned to Lublin in 1920, allowing the reactivation of the Parish of the Transfiguration. In the early years following Poland's regained independence, Orthodox Christians lost nearly all of their churches in Lublin, except for the Church of the Transfiguration and the cemetery Church of the Holy Myrrhbearers. The Polish city administration even considered dissolving the Parish of the Transfiguration and turning the church into a branch of the parish in Chełm. Another proposed solution was to close the parish while keeping the church itself available for an Orthodox military chaplain.

Ultimately, these plans were abandoned, and the Lublin parish resumed operations within the Chełm Deanery of the Diocese of Warsaw and Chełm. The parish remained active throughout the interwar period. In 1923, it had 265 members; mid-decade estimates by the Catholic Diocese of Lublin suggested a higher number of 400. The parish's relatively small size, compared to other Orthodox parishes in the Lublin Land (only the Lublin parish had fewer than 1,000 members), led to another consideration in 1927: transferring the church to a military chaplain, with civil registry duties being assigned to the parish in Dratów. This plan received approval from the Chief Orthodox Chaplain of the Polish Army, Father Colonel Bazyli Martysz. However, the Lublin parish continued to operate within the Chełm Deanery of the Diocese of Warsaw and Chełm. By 1939, the parish had approximately 850 members, including a notable group of Ukrainian emigrants and former soldiers of the Ukrainian People's Republic, as well as Russians who had stayed in Lublin after 1918 and declared Polish nationality to retain their government jobs.

During World War II, the parish operated within the Diocese of Chełm and Podlachia of the Orthodox Church in the General Government until 1943. The church's main dome was damaged during the war.

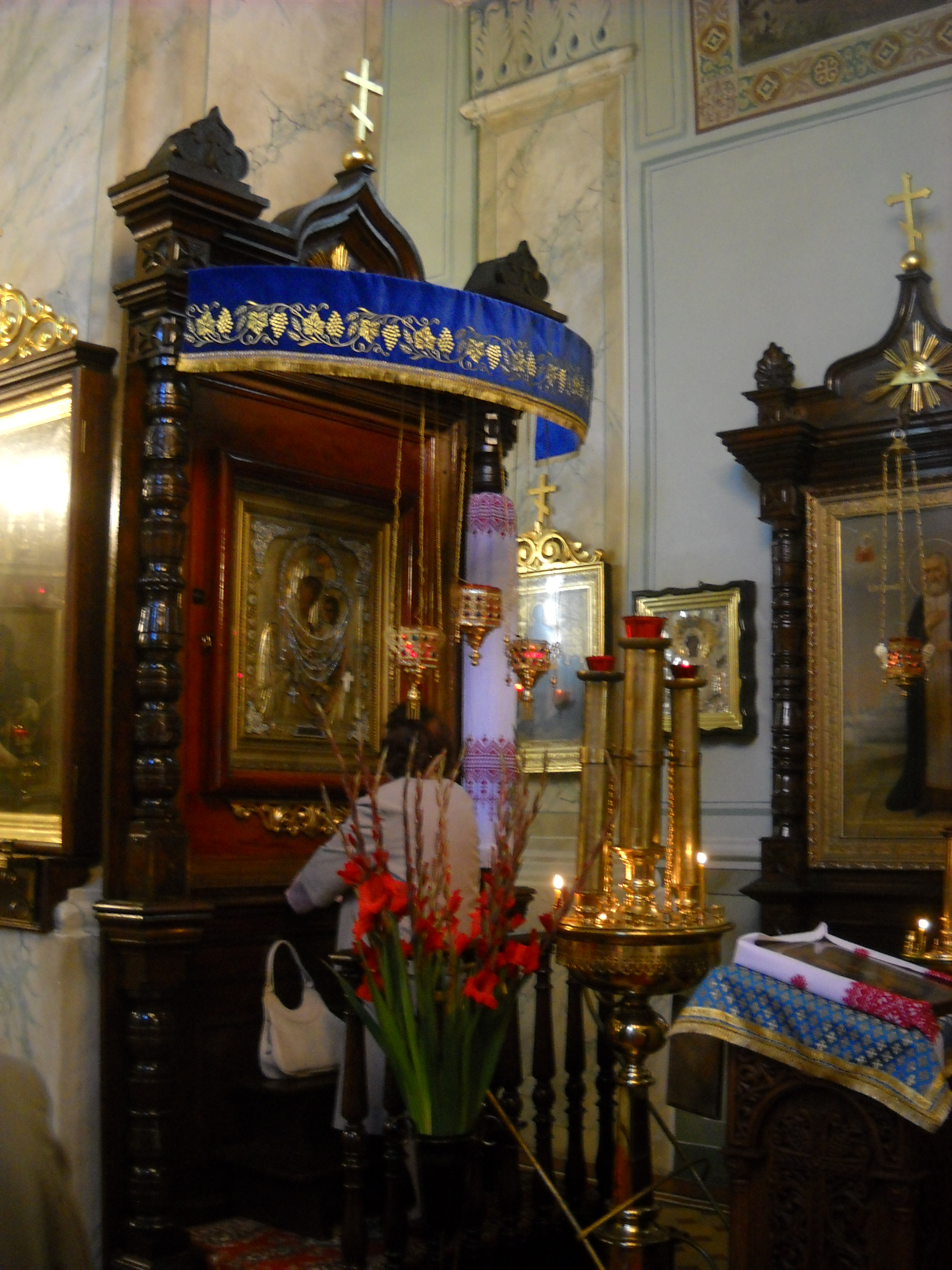
Lublin Icon of the Mother of God

Following the expulsion of Ukrainians from Poland to the Soviet Union between 1944 and 1946, which led to the closure of over 160 parishes of the Polish Orthodox Church in the Lublin and Chełm lands due to a lack of faithful, the church in Lublin was one of six churches in the region (alongside churches in Chełm, Włodawa, Hrubieszów, Biała Podlaska, and the monastery in Jabłeczna) that were allowed to remain open. This decision, made at the request of Bishop Timothy of Lublin, was justified by the need to meet the religious needs of Polish Orthodox Christians.

=== After World War II ===
In October 1945, the church reopened to the faithful after the arrival of Father Aleksy Baranow in Lublin. Under his initiative, the parish undertook the restoration of the damaged church, with partial funding provided by the Ministry of Reconstruction and contributions from the faithful of the Białystok diocese, who donated over 11,000 PLN. Thanks to Father Baranow's efforts, the Polish Orthodox Church confirmed its ownership rights to the Church of the Transfiguration.

Between 1986 and 1992, the church's iconostasis was renovated. Previously, in the 1970s, the church had been robbed, losing several icons, some of which dated back to the 17th century.

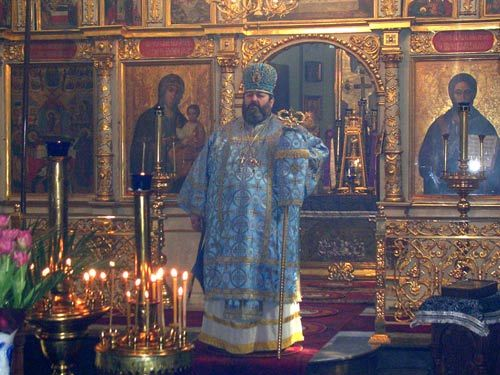
Archbishop Abel, the first ordinary of the Diocese of Lublin and Chełm, in the cathedral in Lublin

In 1989, the Diocese of Lublin and Chełm was established, intended by the Polish Orthodox Church episcopate to continue the traditions of the pre-Union of Brest Chełm Eparchy and the Chełm Eparchy of the Moscow Patriarchate. Archbishop Abel Popławski became the bishop of the new diocese, with the Church of the Transfiguration becoming the cathedral of the diocese, achieving the status of a cathedral for the first time in its history.

In 2003, the Provincial Conservator of Monuments in Lublin awarded the church the Conservator's Laurel for the conservation of the interior's painted decorations.

On 18 August 2016, the church was visited by Patriarch John X of Antioch, on 21 August 2018 by Metropolitan Tikhon, the Primate of the Orthodox Church in America, and on 23 September 2018 by Patriarch Theodore II of Alexandria.

During the Week of Prayer for Christian Unity, the church regularly hosts an ecumenical service.

== Architecture ==
The church is designed in a late Renaissance style, is oriented, and has three naves. The building is constructed on a rectangular plan measuring 25 by approximately 9 meters. Above the church porch, there is an 18-meter-high bell tower. The exterior of the building is decorated sparingly, with only the main nave featuring a more pronounced decorative gable with Baroque volutes. The cathedral is crowned by a single dome with a Russian Orthodox cross.

According to Piotr Krasny, the appearance and layout of the church modify the traditional Russian cross-domed church model towards a three-bay hall church with four corner turrets. The structure is built on a rectangular plan; within its perimeter walls, four pillars define a bay, giving the interior a centralizing character that may suggest a cross plan. However, Krasny notes that a person entering the church does not perceive this plan and instead has the impression of being in a two-bay hall church.

The building's structure is supported by stepped buttresses, which sustain a high entablature with a frieze. The church's pastophoria are topped with stepped gables and pinnacles in the form of obelisks.

=== Iconostasis ===
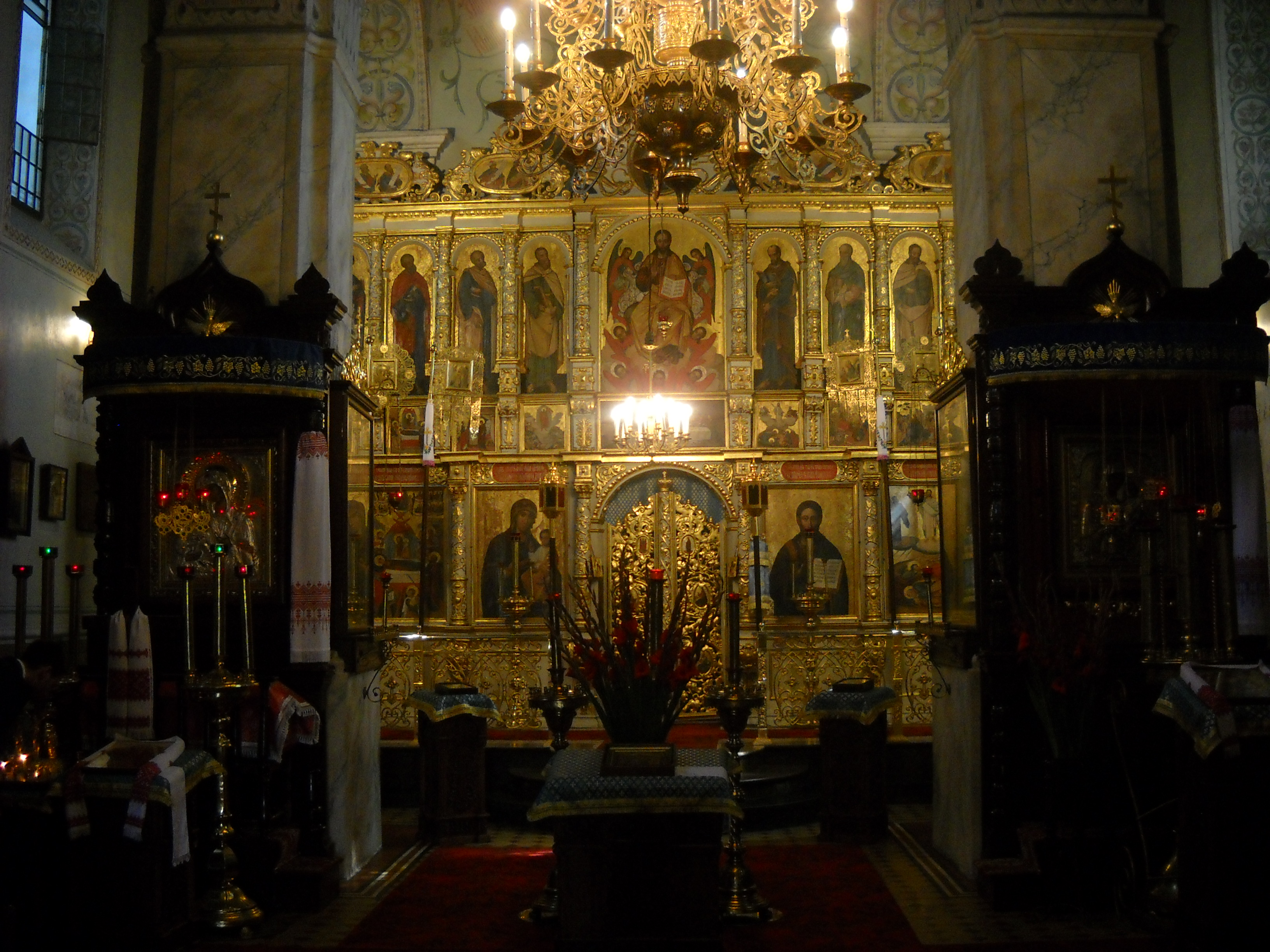
Interior of the cathedral

The iconostasis located in the cathedral was created at the beginning of the 17th century, during the construction of the brick Church of the Transfiguration on the site of the destroyed wooden one. However, for its construction, in addition to 17th century images, older depictions from the 16th century were also used. In the 19th century, some icons were replaced with new images. All the icons were painted with tempera on linden wood by unknown artists.

The iconostasis in the Lublin cathedral is a four-tiered structure, crafted in the late Renaissance style, mimicking a two-story building topped with an attic in its composition. In the first row, from left to right, are icons of St. Basil the Great, St. Lawrence, the Dormition of the Mother of God (probably the oldest image in the entire iconostasis), the Mother of God in the Hodegetria type, Christ the Savior, the Transfiguration of Jesus, St. Stephen, and St. Nicholas. The second row consists of icons of the 12 great Orthodox feasts: the Nativity of Christ, the Baptism of Christ, the Presentation of the Mother of God in the Temple, the Dormition of the Mother of God, the Annunciation, the Resurrection of Christ, the Transfiguration of Jesus, the Nativity of the Mother of God, the Entry of Christ into Jerusalem, the Meeting of the Lord, the Descent of the Holy Spirit, and the Ascension of Christ. In the 19th century, an icon of the Last Supper, created in the same century, was placed in the central part of the row.

In the third row of the iconostasis, the central place is occupied by an icon of Christ Pantocrator created in the 18th century. Initially, it was likely flanked by images of the Mother of God and John the Baptist, forming a Deesis composition. However, the arrangement was altered, and the remaining spaces in the row are now filled with icons of the apostles. The fourth row of the iconostasis depicts Old Testament prophets arranged in pairs. Their representations are in the form of medallions. The highest position in the iconostasis is occupied by an image of God the Father.

The iconostasis is 9.5 meters long and 5.65 meters high. The icons in the sovereign row are separated by Corinthian columns supported by quadrilateral pedestals, adorned with strapwork ornaments and entwined with an imitation of a grapevine.

=== Other interior elements ===
The icons of the Mother of God kept in the church are particularly venerated: a copy of the Jerusalem Icon of the Mother of God and a copy of the Lublin Icon of the Mother of God. During the period of Russian Partition, the church also received a stone from Golgotha as a gift from Patriarch Damian of Jerusalem. The church also houses a copy of the Theotokos of Pochayiv, originating, like the iconostasis, from the older church that previously stood on the cathedral site. In November 2015, an icon of Andrew the Apostle (painted in the Pochaiv Lavra) was brought to the cathedral; the icon contains a relic of the saint (sent from Greece). The cathedral also housed relics of St. Seraphim the Confessor, which were transferred to the church in Rzeszów in December 2017.

== Notable people associated with the cathedral ==
Between 1897 and 1898, the future Patriarch of Moscow and all Russia, Tikhon, served in the church as the Bishop of Lublin.

== Bibliography ==
- Kuprianowicz, Grzegorz; Roszczenko, Mikołaj (1993). Cerkiew prawosławna Przemienienia Pańskiego w Lublinie (in Polish). Lublin: Prawosławna Diecezja Lubelsko-Chełmska. ISBN 83-901221-1-1.
- Grzesiak, Krzysztof (2010). Diecezja lubelska wobec prawosławia w latach 1918–1939 (in Polish). GAUDIUM. ISBN 978-83-7548-003-0.
- Krasny, P. (2003). Architektura cerkiewna na ziemiach ruskich Rzeczypospolitej 1596–1914 (in Polish). Kraków: Instytut Historii Sztuki Uniwersytetu Jagiellońskiego. ISBN 83-242-0361-3.
