= Church of St. Josaphat, Lublin =

Church in Lublin, Poland

Coordinates: 51°14′53″N 22°33′50″E

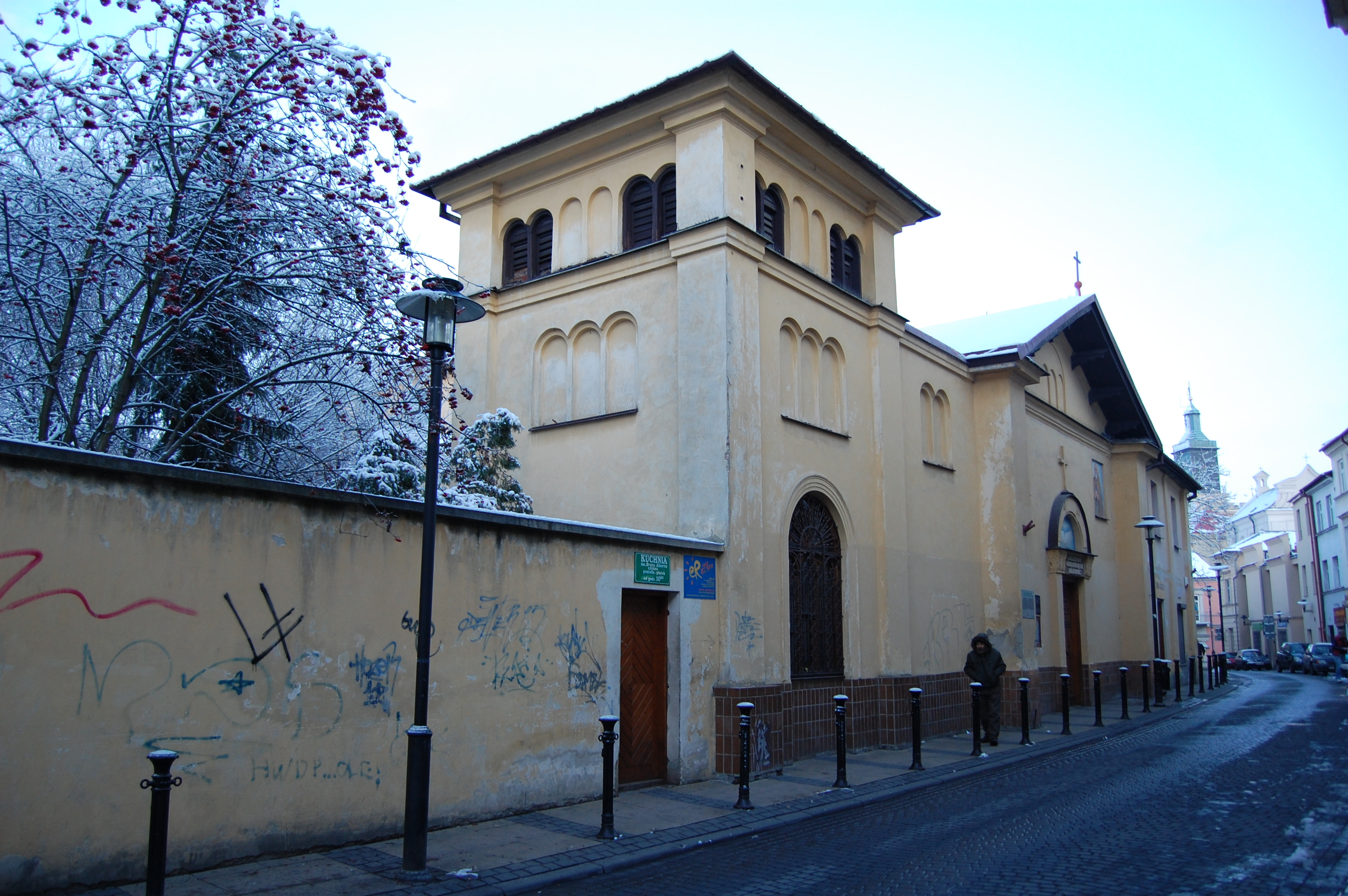
Church of St. Josaphat

Church of St. Josaphat in Lublin was built by Greek merchants in 1786 upon the consent of king Stanisław August Poniatowski. In the second half of the 19th century the temple which was originally dependent on the patriarch of Constantinople was taken over by the Russian Orthodox Church and in 1922 it became the property of the Roman Catholic Church. At present it is Saint Josaphat's church which until recently was also used by Greek Catholics.
