= Destruction of Ukrainian Orthodox Churches in Eastern Poland =

Religious cleansing in Ukraine, 1937–1938

Between 1937 and 1938, more than 150 Ukrainian Orthodox Churches were destroyed under the auspices of the Second Polish Republic in the two regions of Kholm and Pidliashia that now respectively comprise the Lublin and Podlaskie Voivodeships.

== Background ==
At the start of 1918, there were 370 Ukrainian Orthodox Churches in the Kholm and Pidliashia regions. Upon the declaration of Polish independence, later that year, around 320 of these churches were immediately converted to Roman Catholic churches, while the remainder were closed or destroyed. Only 50 Orthodox Churches remained for an Orthodox population estimated at 230,000. In response to the remaining Orthodox faithful, whose refusal to convert was perceived as obstinacy, the Polish authorities launched a campaign to convert "the Ukrainian Orthodox faithful to Roman Catholicism."

Resistance of the local population to these efforts led to the introduction of a policy of "revinidication". In 1938, a coordinating committee was formed and headed by General J. Morawinski, who was delegated to implement the plans, supported by military garrisons. Acting in conjunction with the Coordinating Committee, the Polish press echoed calls for Ukrainian Orthodox Churches to begin using Polish during liturgies and catechism classes, and introduced a new calendar for celebrating "Ukrainian religious feasts". Calls were also made for Orthodox children to attend Mass in Roman Catholic churches, and public assemblies were convened at which "resolutions were passed to destroy Ukrainian orthodox churches".

In 1938, the Polish government issued an order mandating the use of Polish during sermons. In protest, Ukrainian priests stopped giving sermons altogether. In July 1938, the Polish parliament was the scene of protest when Ukrainian members, including the Orthodox priest Reverend Martyn Volkov (Sarny), Stepan Skrypnyk and the Ukrainian Catholic Stepan Baran, lodged multiple complaints "against the convention between Poland and the Vatican". Similarly, protests were also lodged by Ukrainian delegates Ostap Lutsky and deputy senator Mykola Maslov on 14 July 1938. During the session of Parliament, Sejm Deputy Baran declared:

"As a Ukrainian and a Greek Catholic who is subject to the Apostolic capital and the pope, I declare that the question of the defence of the Orthodox Church is a national issue for the entire Ukrainian nation, and therefore we, Ukrainian Greek Catholic Galician deputies will be voting against [the signing of an agreement between Poland and the Vatican] in defence of the Orthodox Church which is dear to us, and in the interest of the Ukrainian nation, in the name of its historical and technical rights"

As punishment for his stand, Rev. Volkov was stripped of his parish in Sarny and forced into hiding in the residence of Metropolitan Dionisii.

In response to these developments in the Polish Parliament, the Lviv-based newspaper Dilo wrote on 9 July 1938:

"Today in the Polish Sejm the representatives of the Ukrainian Greek Catholic and Orthodox population of Galicia, Volyn, and Pidliashia demonstrated their Ukrainian national unity and community in defence of national-religious positions."

The Polish Parliament and Senate ignored the Ukrainian protests, and the convention was enacted on 20 June 1938 in the Second Polish Republic. According to its provisions, "property that had belonged to parishes of the Orthodox Church and had temporarily belonged to the Ukrainian Greek Catholic Church was to be transferred to the Polish state."

After ostensibly attaining the "legal right" to Orthodox Church property, the government of the Second Polish Republic launched the destruction of Ukrainian Orthodox churches in the Kholm and Pidliashia regions in late June 1938. The auxiliary forces mobilized to assist with the operation included Polish state police and Polish workers.

== Result ==
The oldest church located in the Kholm Region was built in the village of Rozotka, immediately upon declaring independence the Polish government had closed the 16th century church and Ukrainian parishioners were permitted to attend Mass there only three times a year. On 8 July 1938 the church was destroyed.

During the months of June and July 1938, a total of 112 church were destroyed in the Kholm and Pidliashia regions of the Second Polish Republic. 98 of them had been constructed before the Union of Brest (1596) and included: the Church in Zamostia (1589), the Cathedral in Bila Pidliaska (1582), the Church in Kornystia (1578) and finally the Church in Shchebreshyn (1184). In his interpellation to then Polish Prime Minister Felicjan Sławoj Składkowski, parliamentarian Stepan Baran noted that "all of these gems of ancient Ukrainian architecture were utterly destroyed and irredeemably lost to civilization"

== Reactions ==
On 16 July 1938 Metropolitan Andrei Sheptytsky, the head of the Ukrainian Greek Catholic Church, issue his archpastoral letter condemning "the acts of vandalism committed by the Poles, who had shown themselves to be the enemies of the Christian faith". In the letter Metropolitan Andrei deeply sympathised with his Orthodox brethren. The contents of the letter was not widely known, due to the fact it was seized by the Polish authorities.

Ukrainian hierarchies abroad also reacted with indignation to the action of the Polish government, Archbishop Ioann Teodorovych, the metropolitan of the Ukrainian Orthodox Church in the USA, "condemned the destruction of churches, the forcible conversion of Orthodox parishioners to Roman Catholicism, and the Vatican's illegal sale to Poland of Orthodox Church property, which it had never owned in the first place".

=== Polish Support and Rapport with Orthodox Ukrainians. ===
The Council of Bishops of the Orthodox Autocephalous Church in Poland vigorously protested against the destruction of the churches and on 16 July 1938 issued a letter of indignation, that also reached only a portion of the population due to censorship.

Several Polish lawyers and journalists decried the persecution of Orthodox Ukrainians and the destruction of local churches.
