= Seraphim Lade =

Seraphim (Alfred Lade or Karl Georg Albert Lade) (4 June 1883 in Leipzig - 14 September 1950 in Munich) was a metropolitan of the Russian Orthodox Church Outside Russia. During World War II, he supported the invasion of the USSR, but he also saved the life of Alexander (Nyemolovsky), the bishop of Brussels and Belgium, imprisoned by the Gestapo due to his anti-Nazi views.

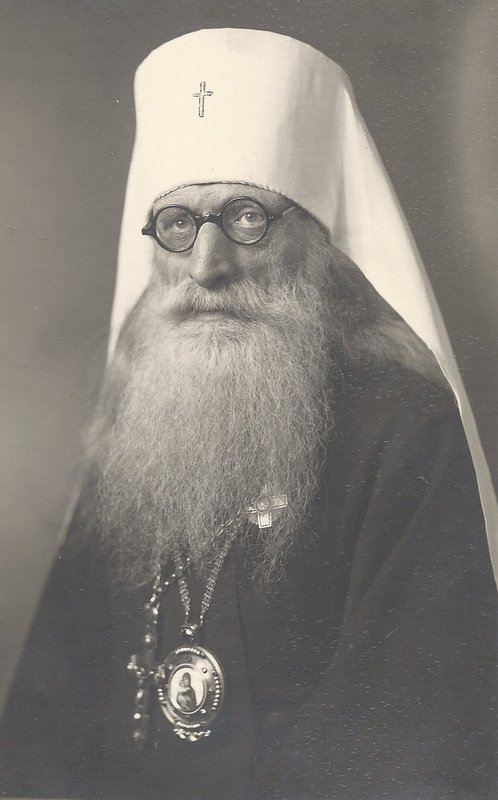
Seraphim Lade (1883-1950), the Metropolitan of Berlin and Germany of the Russian Orthodox Church Outside Russia (1938-1950)

== Early life and education ==
Lade was born into a Protestant family in Leipzig and converted to Orthodoxy at the age of 20; he studied at the St. Petersburg Theological Seminary and the Moscow Theological Academy.

He married in 1907, but his wife died in 1920.

== Clerical career ==
He was ordained as a priest in 1912; he became abbot of the Holy Protection Monastery in Kharkov in 1924.

In 1930, the Russian authorities deported him to Germany; the following year he became the administrator of the Austrian communities.

He was created Bishop of Berlin and Germany in 1938; the following year, his title was given as ‘Metropolitan’.

In November 1939, just after WWII had started, Lade and Bishop Sergius, (assistant to Metropolitan Evlogii) made an agreement that the “Evlogian” parishes would retain their independence, while joining the Berlin-Germany Diocese of the ROCOR (the only recognised Orthodox church in Germany).

During WWII he supported the Third Reich and took responsibility for the Metropolitan Evlogii as well as the ROCOR congregations; in 1942 he was given the title of “Metropolitan Seraphim of Central Europe, referring to his parishes in Austria, the Czech lands and Slovakia”.

After Lade’s death in 1950, Archbishop Benedict (Basil Bobkovsky) was responsible for the German diocese for a year.

== Publications ==
His publications include;

- Science and Religion (Wissenschaft und Religion, 1946)
- The Immortality of the Soul (Die Unsterblichkeit der Seele, 1947)
- Apologetical Essays (Apologetische Aufsätze, 1948)
- Orthodox Dogma (Das Orthodoxe Dogma, 1948)
- The Eastern Church (Die Ostkirche, 1950)

== See also links ==
- Archbishop Tikhon
- Eulogius Georgiyevsky

== Sources ==
- Сорокалетие служения в священном сане Высокопреосвященнейшего Серафима, Митрополита Берлинского и Германского // «Православная Русь». — 1947. — № 14. — С. 14
- Кончина митрополита Серафима // «Православная Русь». — 1950. — № 18. — С. 4
- Протопресвитер Георгий Граббе Фантастическая история. Гитлер и РПЦЗ (1955) // Собрание сочинений, т.2, Монреаль 1970, стр. 161—172.
- К 40-летию кончины митрополита Серафими (Ляде). Правда и ложь // «Вестник Германской епархии РПЦЗ». — 1990. — № 6. — С. 19-25
- А. А. Кострюков. Русская Зарубежная Церковь в 1939—1964 гг. Административное устройство и отношения с Церковью в Отечестве. — Москва: Издательство ПСТГУ, 2015.
- Лавринов В., прот. Обновленческий раскол в портретах его деятелей. — М.: Общество любителей церковной истории, 2016. — 736 с. — (Материалы по истории Церкви. Кн. 54). — ISBN 978-5-9906510-7-4.
