= Voronets =

Voronets is a Russian surname associated with the Russian noble Voronets family. Notable people with the surname include:

- Nadezhda Voronets, Russian and Soviet geologist and paleontologist
- Olga Voronets, Russian mezzo-soprano folk singer

== See also ==
- Woroniec
- Voroneț
