= Lisy, Lublin Voivodeship =

Lisy
- Village
- Location within Poland
- Coordinates: 51°58′35″N 23°07′42″E
- Country: Poland
- Voivodeship: Lublin
- County: Biała
- Gmina: Biała Podlaska

Lisy [ˈlʲisɨ] is a village in the administrative district of Gmina Biała Podlaska, within Biała County, Lublin Voivodeship, in eastern Poland.
