= Hrud, Poland =

Hrud
- Village
- Location within Poland
- Coordinates: 52°6′N 23°7′E
- Country: Poland
- Voivodeship: Lublin
- County: Biała
- Gmina: Biała Podlaska

Hrud [xrut] is a village in the administrative district of Gmina Biała Podlaska, within Biała County, Lublin Voivodeship, in eastern Poland.
