= Wilczyn, Lublin Voivodeship =

Wilczyn
- Village
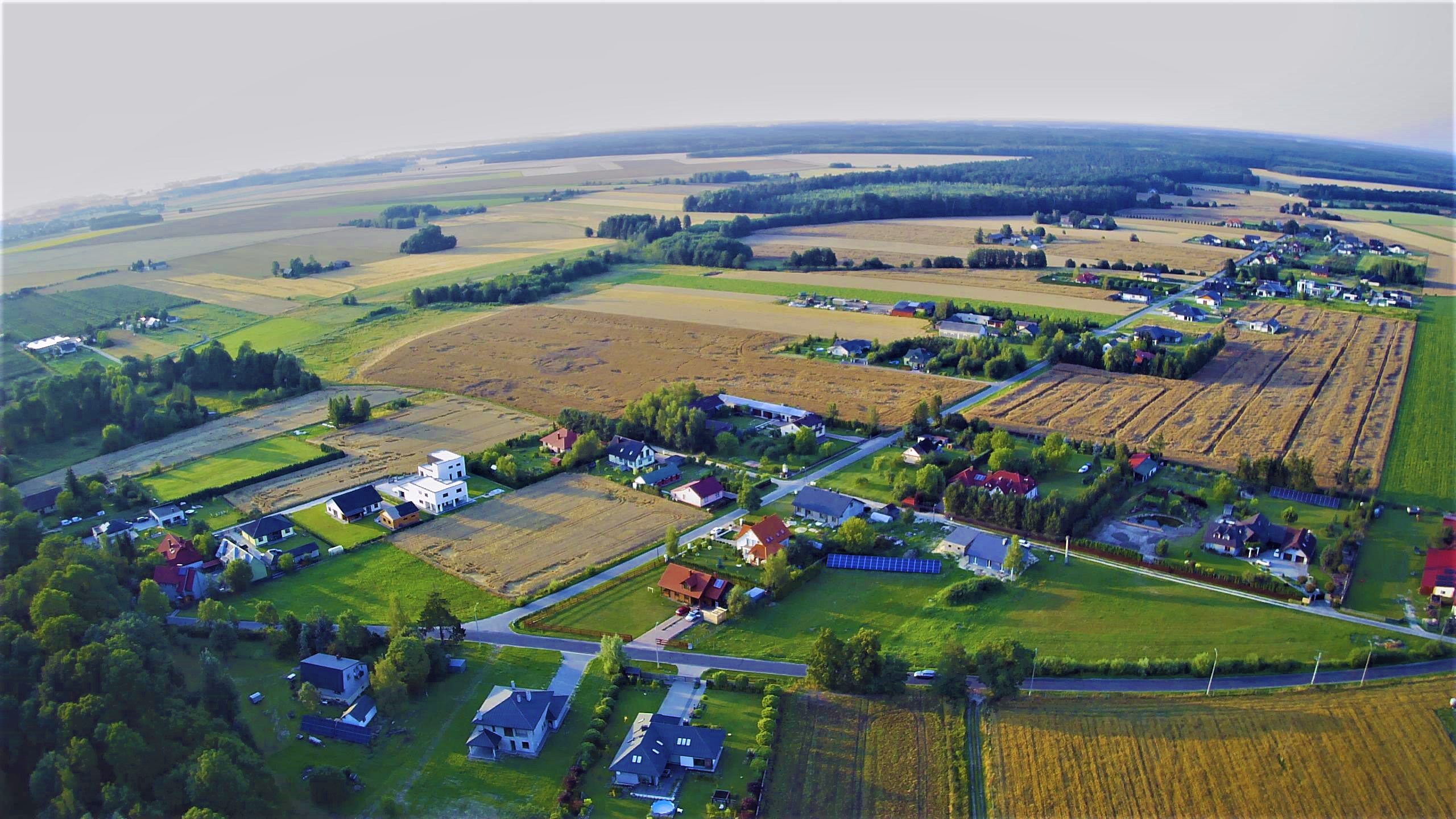

- Location within Poland
- Coordinates: 52°4′N 23°10′E
- Country: Poland
- Voivodeship: Lublin
- County: Biała
- Gmina: Biała Podlaska
- Elevation: 151 m (495 ft)

Population
  - Total: 130

Wilczyn [ˈvʲilt͡ʂɨn] is a village in the administrative district of Gmina Biała Podlaska, within Biała County, Lublin Voivodeship, in eastern Poland.
