= Ogrodniki, Gmina Biała Podlaska =

Ogrodniki
- Village
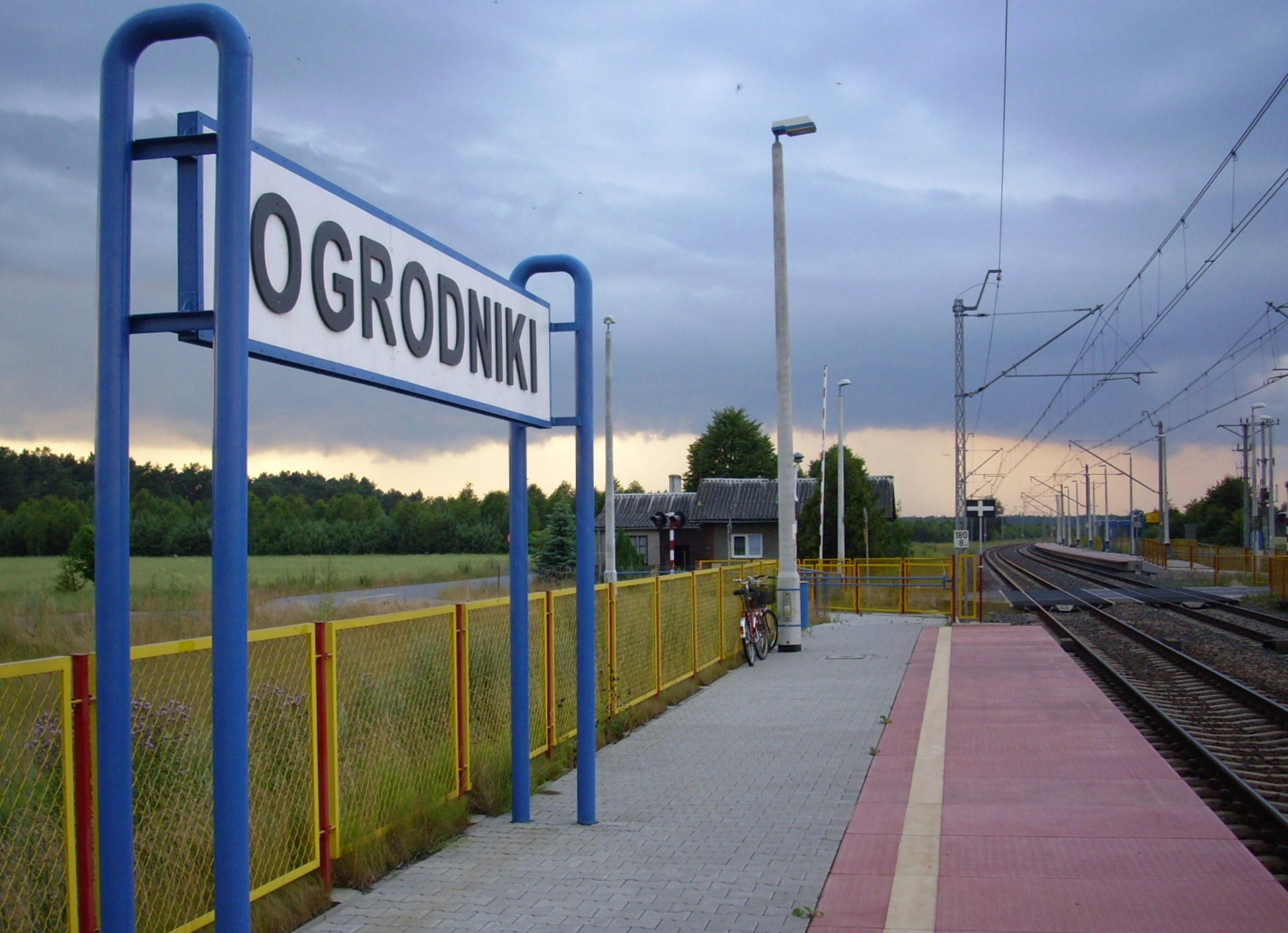
- Ogrodniki train stop

- Location within Poland
- Coordinates: 51°59′42″N 23°15′27″E
- Country: Poland
- Voivodeship: Lublin
- County: Biała
- Gmina: Biała Podlaska

Population
  - Total: 90
- Time zone: UTC+1 (CET)
  - Summer (DST): UTC+2 (CEST)

Ogrodniki [ɔɡrɔdˈɲikʲi] is a village in the administrative district of Gmina Biała Podlaska, within Biała County, Lublin Voivodeship, in eastern Poland.

== History ==
Three Polish citizens were murdered by Nazi Germany in the village during World War II.
