= Perkowice =

- Village
- Location within Poland
- Coordinates: 52°0′N 23°17′E
- Country: Poland
- Voivodeship: Lublin
- County: Biała
- Gmina: Biała Podlaska

Perkowice [pɛrkɔˈvʲit͡sɛ] is a village in the administrative district of Gmina Biała Podlaska, within Biała County, Lublin Voivodeship, in eastern Poland.
