= Swory =

- Village
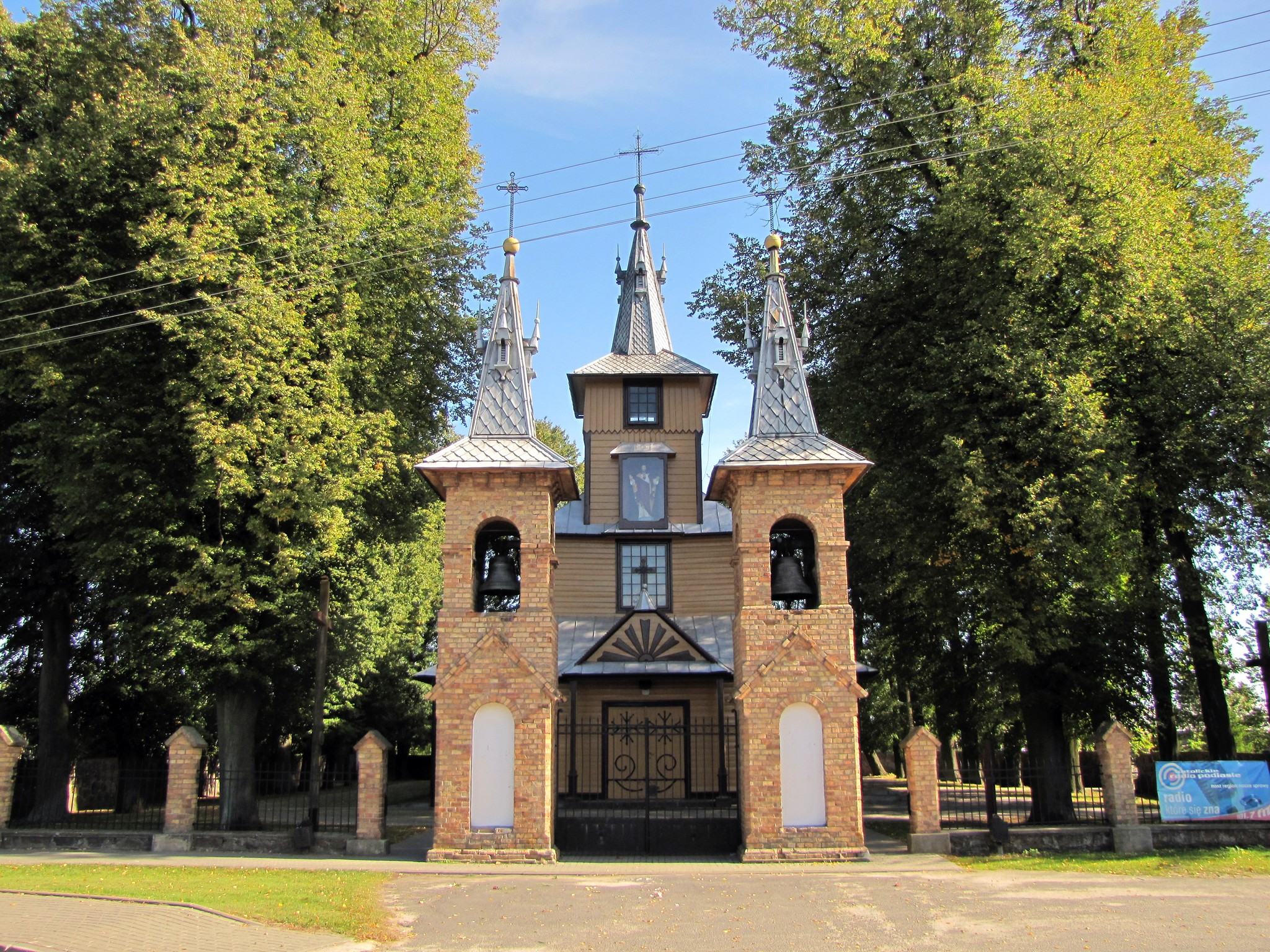
- Church of the Sacred Heart of Jesus in Swory

- Location within Poland
- Coordinates: 52°5′N 22°56′E
- Country: Poland
- Voivodeship: Lublin
- County: Biała
- Gmina: Biała Podlaska
- Time zone: UTC+1 (CET)
  - Summer (DST): UTC+2 (CEST)
- Vehicle registration: LBI

Swory [ˈsfɔrɨ] is a village in the administrative district of Gmina Biała Podlaska, within Biała County, Lublin Voivodeship, in eastern Poland.
