= Musiejówka =

- Village
- Location within Poland
- Coordinates: 51°53′06″N 23°04′31″E
- Country: Poland
- Voivodeship: Lublin
- County: Biała
- Gmina: Rossosz

Musiejówka [muɕɛˈjufka] is a village in the administrative district of Gmina Rossosz, within Biała County, Lublin Voivodeship, in eastern Poland.
