= Bordziłówka =

- Village
- Location within Poland
- Coordinates: 51°51′N 23°11′E
- Country: Poland
- Voivodeship: Lublin
- County: Biała
- Gmina: Rossosz
- Time zone: UTC+1 (CET)
  - Summer (DST): UTC+2 (CEST)
- Vehicle registration: LBI

Bordziłówka [bɔrd͡ʑiˈwufka] is a village in the administrative district of Gmina Rossosz, within Biała County, Lublin Voivodeship, in eastern Poland.

== History ==
Five Polish citizens were murdered by Nazi Germany in the village during World War II.
