= Kijowiec, Lublin Voivodeship =

Kijowiec
- Village
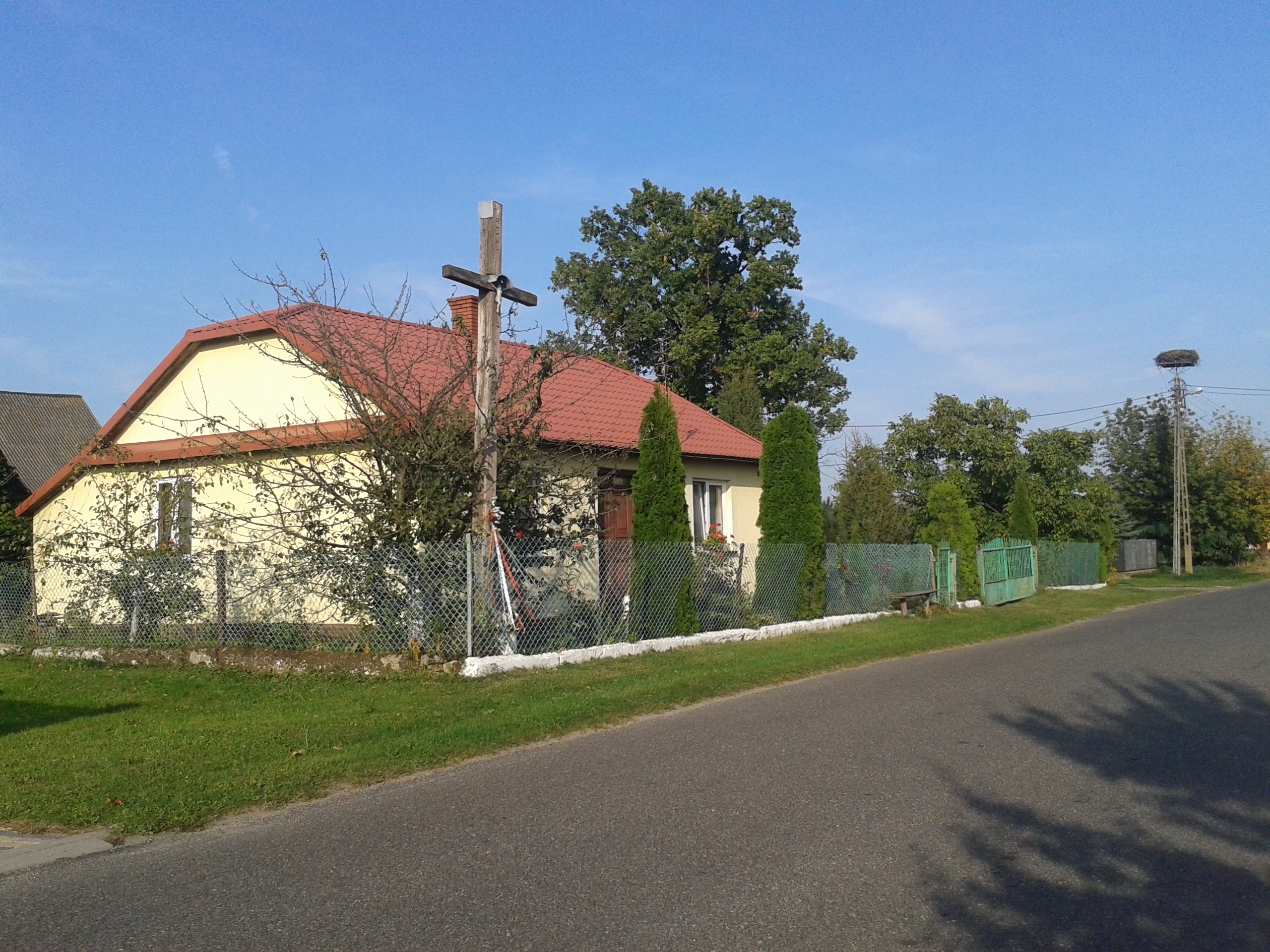

- Location within Poland
- Coordinates: 52°4′N 23°22′E
- Country: Poland
- Voivodeship: Lublin
- County: Biała
- Gmina: Zalesie
- Time zone: UTC+1 (CET)
  - Summer (DST): UTC+2 (CEST)

Kijowiec [kʲiˈjɔvʲɛt͡s] is a village in the administrative district of Gmina Zalesie, within Biała County, Lublin Voivodeship, in eastern Poland.

== History ==
16 Polish citizens were murdered by Nazi Germany in the village during World War II.
