= Ortel Książęcy Drugi =

- Village
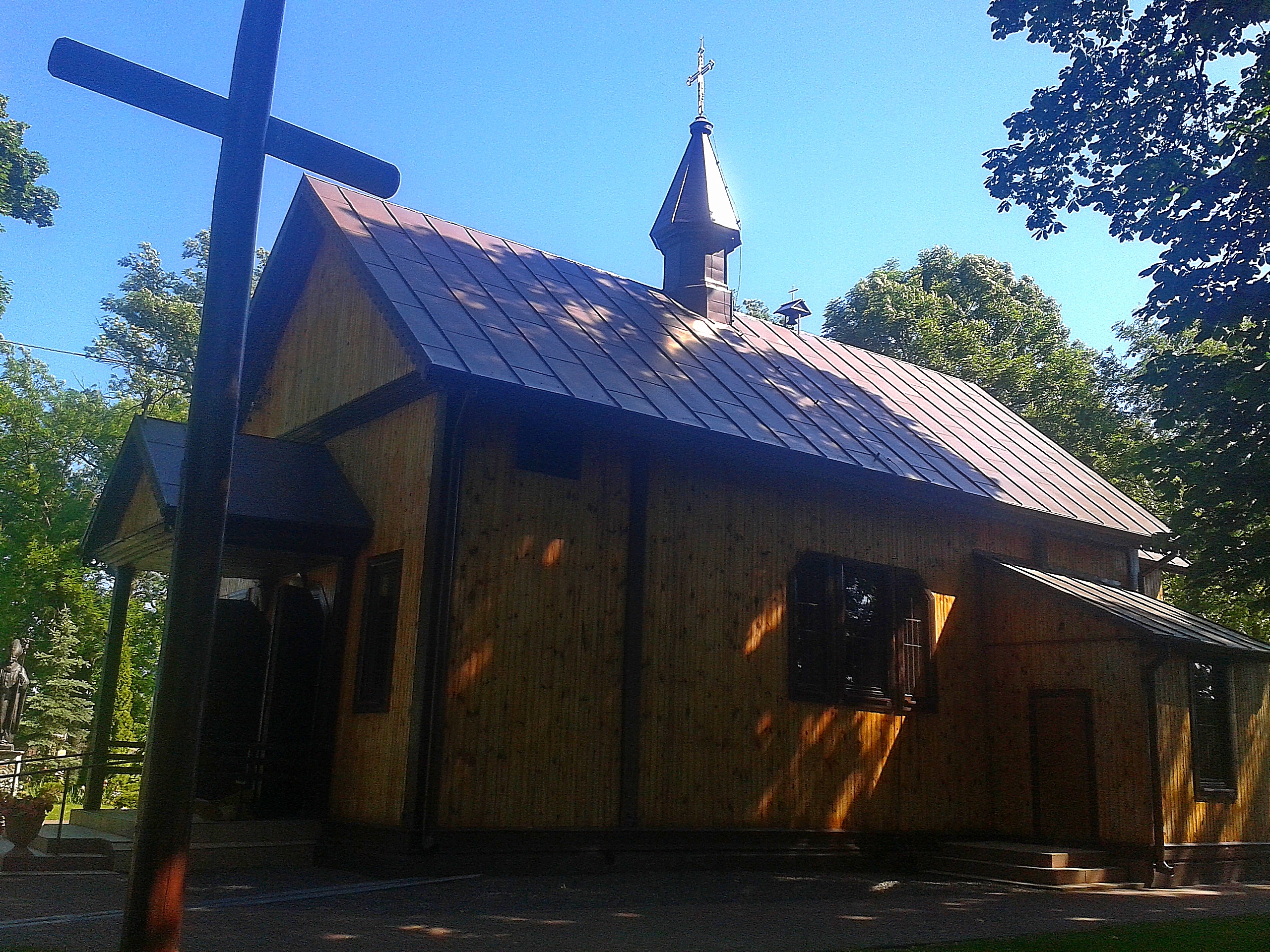

- Location within Poland
- Coordinates: 51°59′18″N 23°16′20″E
- Country: Poland
- Voivodeship: Lublin
- County: Biała
- Gmina: Biała Podlaska

Ortel Książęcy Drugi [ˈɔrtɛl kɕɔ̃ˈʐɛnt͡sɨ ˈdruɡʲi] is a village in the administrative district of Gmina Biała Podlaska, within Biała County, Lublin Voivodeship, in eastern Poland.
