= Dokudów Pierwszy =

- Village
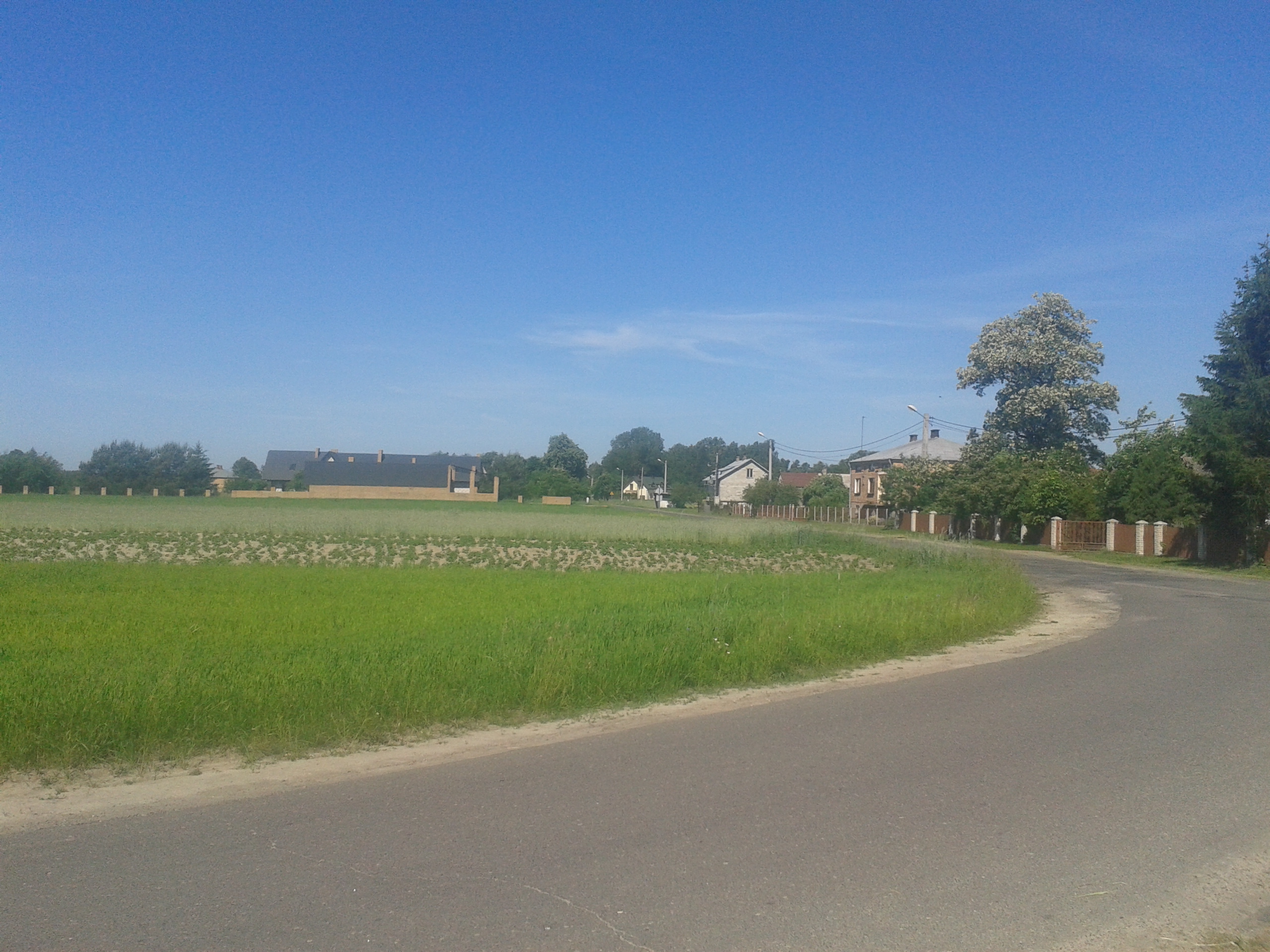

- Location within Poland
- Coordinates: 51°57′6″N 23°12′51″E
- Country: Poland
- Voivodeship: Lublin
- County: Biała
- Gmina: Biała Podlaska

Population
  - Total: 252
- Time zone: UTC+1 (CET)
  - Summer (DST): UTC+2 (CEST)

Dokudów Pierwszy [dɔˈkuduf ˈpʲɛrfʂɨ] is a village in the administrative district of Gmina Biała Podlaska, within Biała County, Lublin Voivodeship, in eastern Poland.

== History ==
Six Polish citizens were murdered by Nazi Germany in the village during World War II.
