= Janusz Maksymiuk =

Polish politician

member of Sejm 2005-2007
- In office 19 October 2005 – 4 November 2007

Personal details
- Born: 19 January 1947 (age 79) Janówka, Poland
- Party: Self-Defence of the Republic of Poland

Janusz Roman Maksymiuk (born 19 January 1947 in Janówka) is a Polish politician. He was elected to the Sejm on 25 September 2005, getting 7,384 votes in 22 Krosno district as a candidate from the Samoobrona Rzeczpospolitej Polskiej list.

He was also a member of Sejm 1991-1993 and Sejm 1993-1997.

== See also ==
- Members of Polish Sejm 2005-2007
