= Kłoda Mała =

- Village
- Location within Poland
- Coordinates: 52°2′N 23°21′E
- Country: Poland
- Voivodeship: Lublin
- County: Biała
- Gmina: Zalesie

Kłoda Mała [ˈkwɔda ˈmawa] is a village in the administrative district of Gmina Zalesie, within Biała County, Lublin Voivodeship, in eastern Poland.
