= Nowy Sławacinek =

- Village
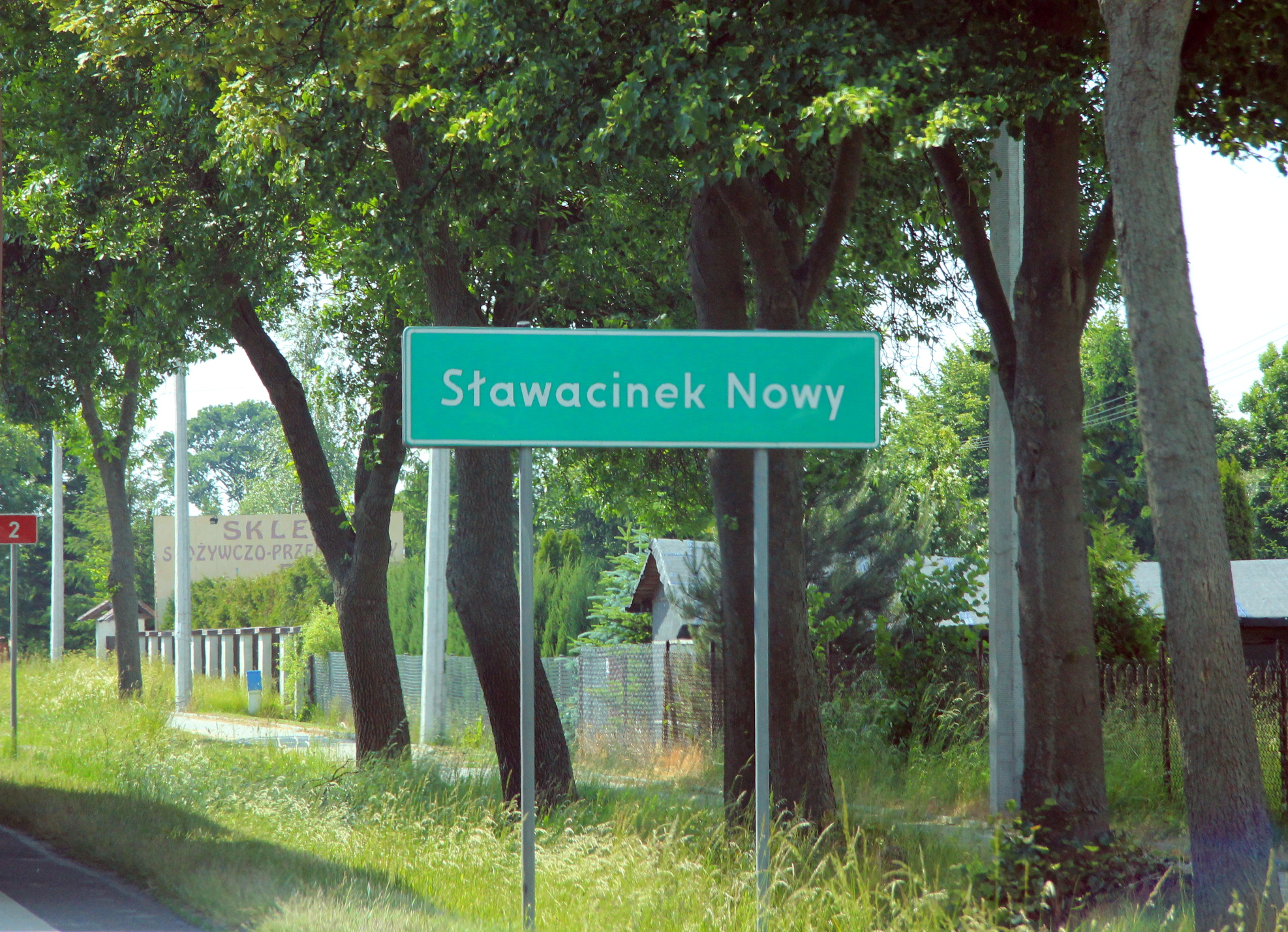

- Location within Poland
- Coordinates: 52°2′N 23°4′E
- Country: Poland
- Voivodeship: Lublin
- County: Biała
- Gmina: Biała Podlaska

Population (approx.)
  - Total: 300

Nowy Sławacinek [ˈnɔvɨ swavaˈt͡ɕinɛk] is a village in the administrative district of Gmina Biała Podlaska, within Biała County, Lublin Voivodeship, in eastern Poland.
