= Kijowiec-Kolonia =

- Village
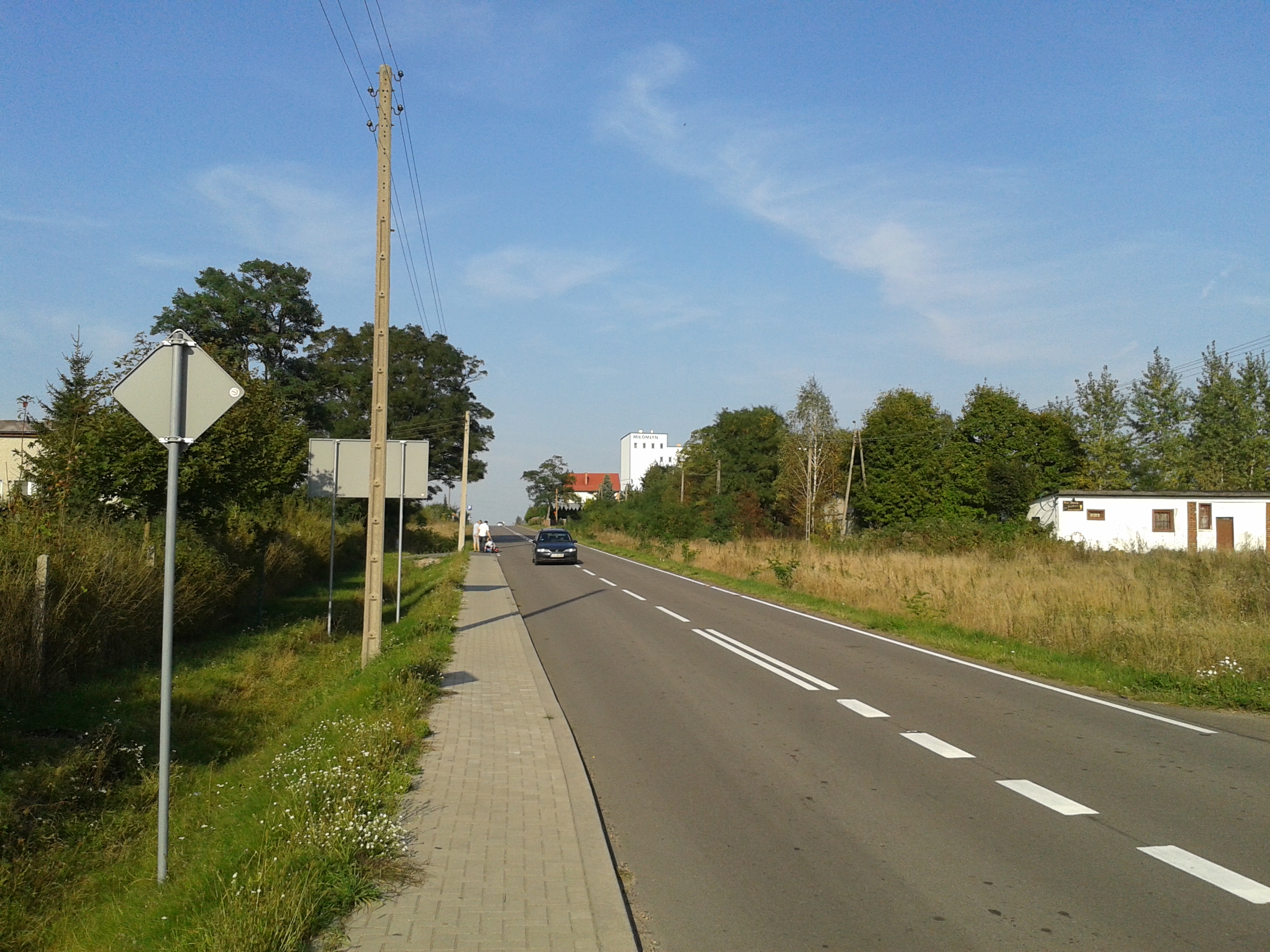

- Location within Poland
- Coordinates: 52°4′44″N 23°23′19″E
- Country: Poland
- Voivodeship: Lublin
- County: Biała
- Gmina: Zalesie

Kijowiec-Kolonia [kʲiˈjɔvʲɛt͡s kɔˈlɔɲa] is a village in the administrative district of Gmina Zalesie, within Biała County, Lublin Voivodeship, in eastern Poland.
