= Dereczanka =

- Village
- Location within Poland
- Coordinates: 52°5′N 23°25′E
- Country: Poland
- Voivodeship: Lublin
- County: Biała
- Gmina: Zalesie

Dereczanka [dɛrɛˈt͡ʂaŋka] is a village in the administrative district of Gmina Zalesie, within Biała County, Lublin Voivodeship, in eastern Poland.
