= Nowosiółki, Gmina Zalesie =

Nowosiółki
- Village
- Location within Poland
- Coordinates: 52°5′12″N 23°25′26″E
- Country: Poland
- Voivodeship: Lublin
- County: Biała
- Gmina: Zalesie

Nowosiółki [nɔvɔˈɕuu̯kʲi] is a village in the administrative district of Gmina Zalesie, within Biała County, Lublin Voivodeship, in eastern Poland.
