= Sycyna, Lublin Voivodeship =

Sycyna
- Village
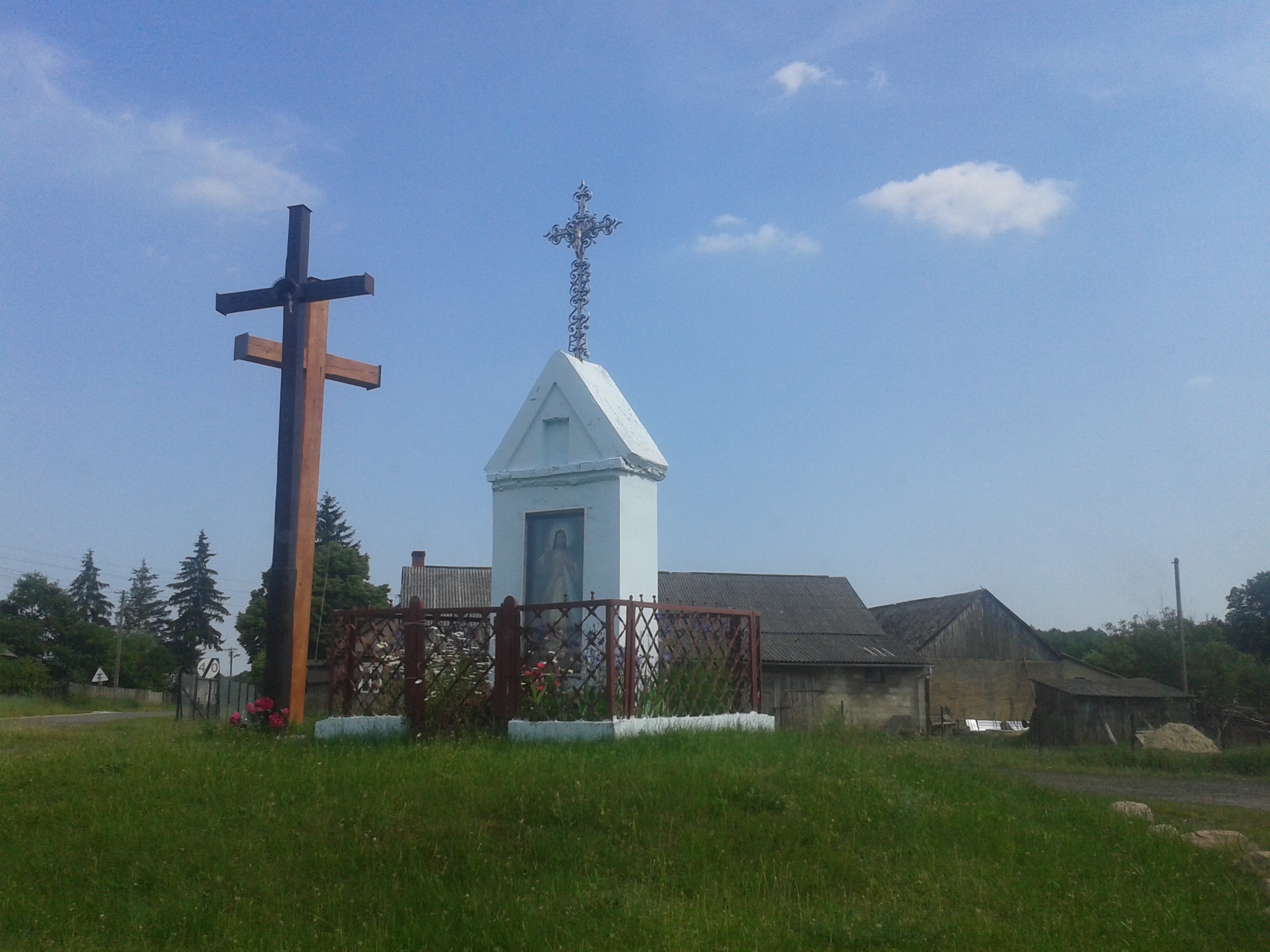

- Location within Poland
- Coordinates: 52°1′50″N 22°56′40″E
- Country: Poland
- Voivodeship: Lublin
- County: Biała
- Gmina: Biała Podlaska

Population
  - Total: 136
- Time zone: UTC+1 (CET)
  - Summer (DST): UTC+2 (CEST)

Sycyna [sɨˈt͡sɨna] is a village in the administrative district of Gmina Biała Podlaska, within Biała County, Lublin Voivodeship, in eastern Poland.

== History ==
Six Polish citizens were murdered by Nazi Germany in the village during World War II.
