= Styrzyniec =

- Village
- Location within Poland
- Coordinates: 52°2′N 23°0′E
- Country: Poland
- Voivodeship: Lublin
- County: Biała
- Gmina: Biała Podlaska
- Elevation: 145 m (476 ft)

Styrzyniec [stɨˈʐɨɲɛt͡s] is a village in the administrative district of Gmina Biała Podlaska, within Biała County, Lublin Voivodeship, in eastern Poland.
