= Dobryń Duży =

- Village
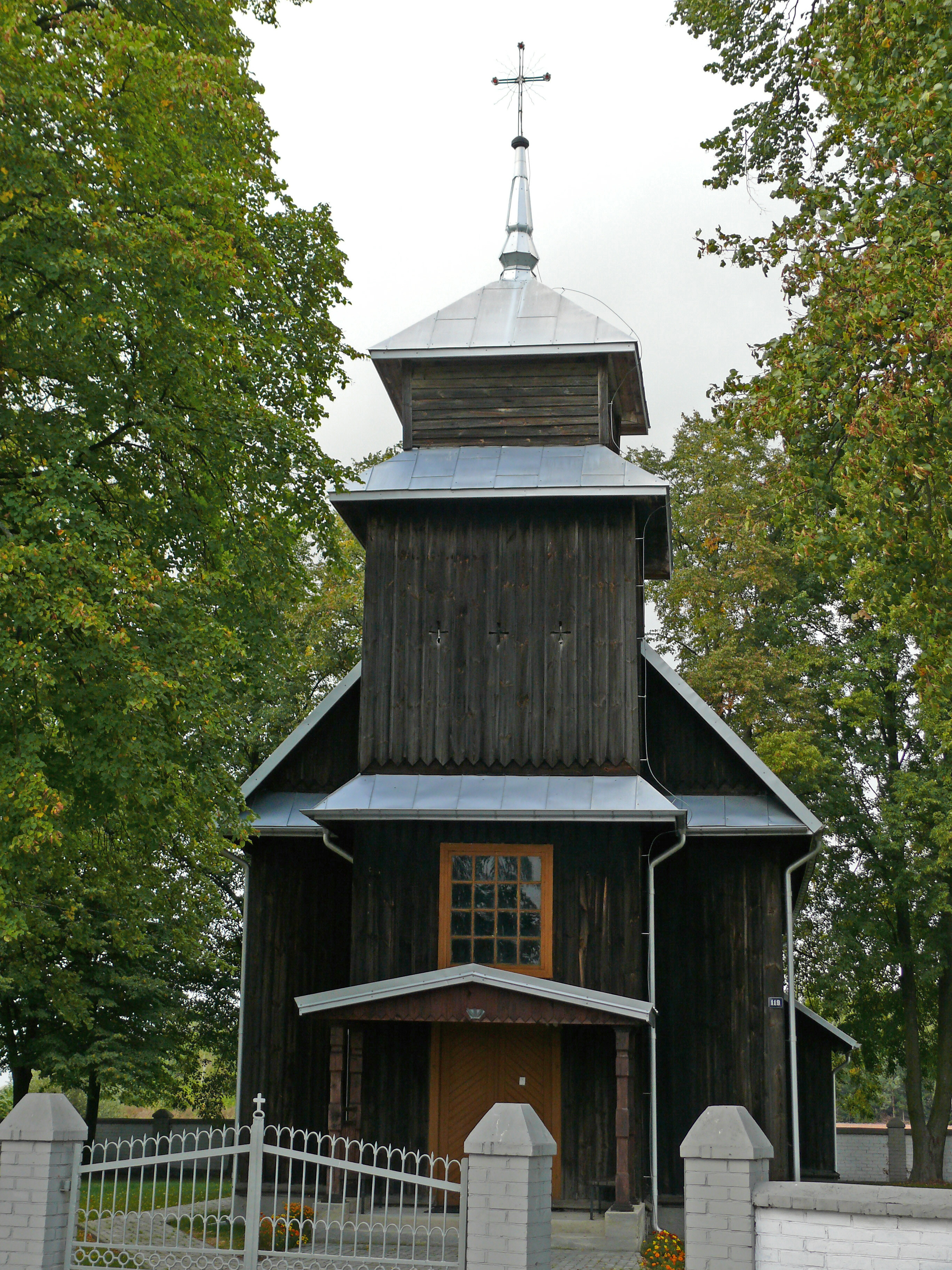
- Church in Dobryń Duży

- Location within Poland
- Coordinates: 52°3′44″N 23°29′10″E
- Country: Poland
- Voivodeship: Lublin
- County: Biała
- Gmina: Zalesie
- Time zone: UTC+1 (CET)
  - Summer (DST): UTC+2 (CEST)

Dobryń Duży [ˈdɔbrɨɲ ˈduʐɨ] is a village in the administrative district of Gmina Zalesie, within Biała County, Lublin Voivodeship, in eastern Poland.

== History ==
Three Polish citizens were murdered by Nazi Germany in the village during World War II.

== Transport ==
In the future, the A2 motorway from Warsaw will have an exit here. Construction of the motorway from Kijowiec to Dobryń Duży is scheduled to start in 2027 and end in 2029.

National road 92 passes to the south of Dobryń Duży.

The nearest railway station is in Terespol.
