= Cełujki =

- Village
- Location within Poland
- Coordinates: 52°6′N 22°54′E
- Country: Poland
- Voivodeship: Lublin
- County: Biała
- Gmina: Biała Podlaska

Cełujki [t͡sɛˈwui̯kʲi] (Ukrainian: Цілуйки, Tsiluyky) is a village in the administrative district of Gmina Biała Podlaska, within Biała County, Lublin Voivodeship, in eastern Poland.
