= Horbów-Kolonia =

- Village
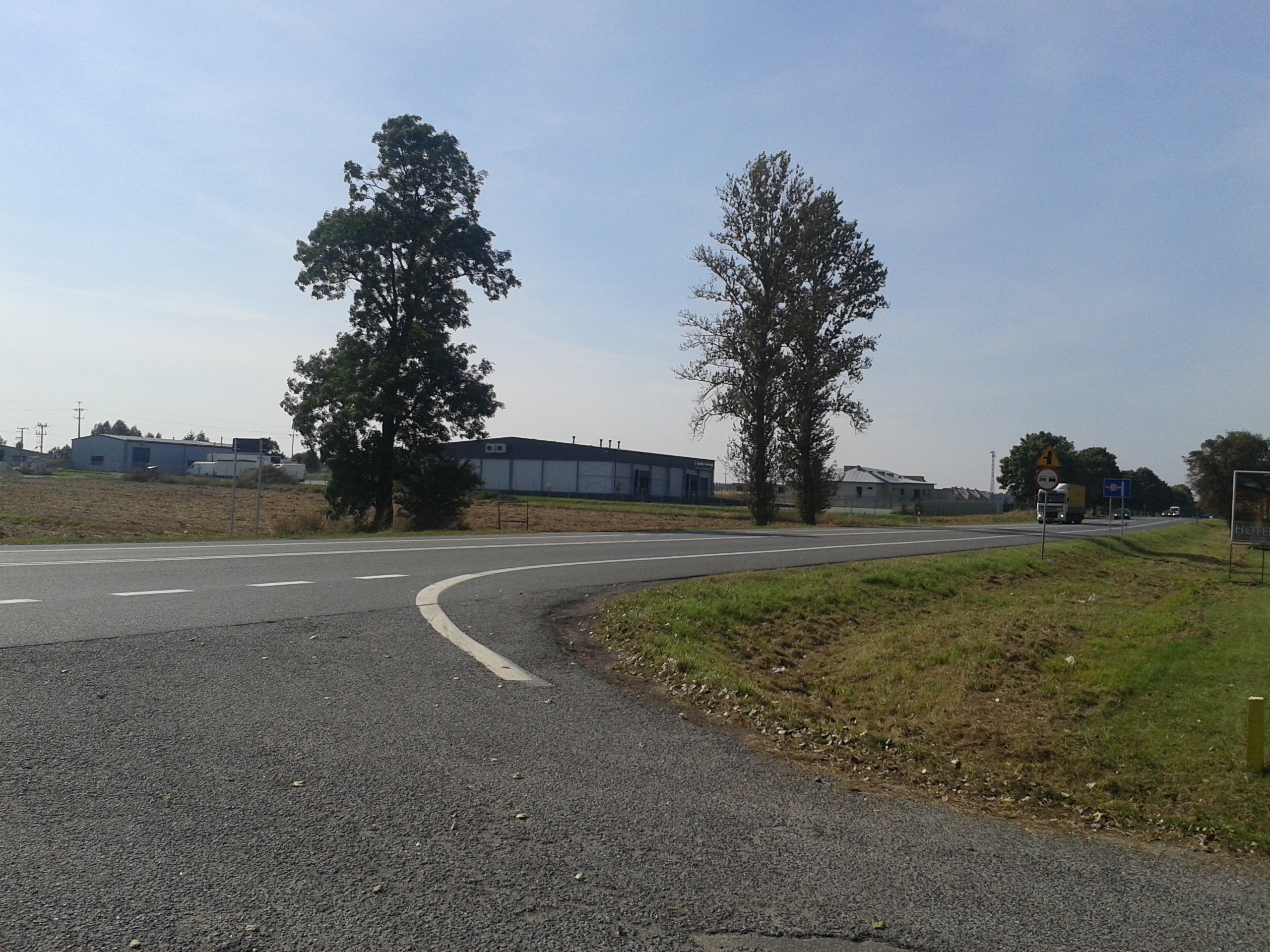

- Location within Poland
- Coordinates: 52°1′52″N 23°19′8″E
- Country: Poland
- Voivodeship: Lublin
- County: Biała
- Gmina: Zalesie

Horbów-Kolonia [ˈxɔrbuf kɔˈlɔɲa] is a village in the administrative district of Gmina Zalesie, within Biała County, Lublin Voivodeship, in eastern Poland.
