= Michałówka, Gmina Biała Podlaska =

Michałówka
- Village
- Location within Poland
- Coordinates: 51°57′5″N 23°6′11″E
- Country: Poland
- Voivodeship: Lublin
- County: Biała
- Gmina: Biała Podlaska

Population
  - Total: 120 (2,005)
- Time zone: UTC+1 (CET)
  - Summer (DST): UTC+2 (CEST)

Michałówka [mʲixaˈwufka] is a village in the administrative district of Gmina Biała Podlaska, within Biała County, Lublin Voivodeship, in eastern Poland.

== History ==
Eight Polish citizens were murdered by Nazi Germany in the village during World War II.
