= Łukowce =

- Village
- Location within Poland
- Coordinates: 52°5′N 23°1′E
- Country: Poland
- Voivodeship: Lublin
- County: Biała
- Gmina: Biała Podlaska

Łukowce [wuˈkɔft͡sɛ] is a village in the administrative district of Gmina Biała Podlaska, within Biała County, Lublin Voivodeship, in eastern Poland.
