= Kłoda Duża =

- Village
- Location within Poland
- Coordinates: 52°1′5″N 23°19′50″E
- Country: Poland
- Voivodeship: Lublin
- County: Biała
- Gmina: Zalesie

Kłoda Duża [ˈkwɔda ˈduʐa] is a village in the administrative district of Gmina Zalesie, within Biała County, Lublin Voivodeship, in eastern Poland.
