= Cicibór Mały =

- Village
- Location within Poland
- Coordinates: 52°6′N 23°6′E
- Country: Poland
- Voivodeship: Lublin
- County: Biała
- Gmina: Biała Podlaska

Cicibór Mały [t͡ɕiˈt͡ɕibur ˈmawɨ] (Ukrainian: Цицібір Малий, Tsytsibir Malyy) is a village in the administrative district of Gmina Biała Podlaska, within Biała County, Lublin Voivodeship, in eastern Poland.
