= Zacisze, Lublin Voivodeship =

Zacisze
- Village
- Location within Poland
- Coordinates: 52°05′06″N 23°12′21″E
- Country: Poland
- Voivodeship: Lublin
- County: Biała
- Gmina: Biała Podlaska

Zacisze [zaˈt͡ɕiʂɛ] is a village in the administrative district of Gmina Biała Podlaska, within Biała County, Lublin Voivodeship, in eastern Poland.
