= Kożanówka, Gmina Rossosz =

Kożanówka
- Village
- Location within Poland
- Coordinates: 51°50′21″N 23°08′28″E
- Country: Poland
- Voivodeship: Lublin
- County: Biała
- Gmina: Rossosz

Kożanówka [kɔʐaˈnufka] is a village in the administrative district of Gmina Rossosz, within Biała County, Lublin Voivodeship, in eastern Poland.
