= Młyniec =

Młyniec may refer to the following places:

- Młyniec, Lublin Voivodeship (east Poland)
- Młyniec, Lubusz Voivodeship (west Poland)
- Młyniec, Warmian-Masurian Voivodeship (north Poland)
