= Kaliłów =

- Village
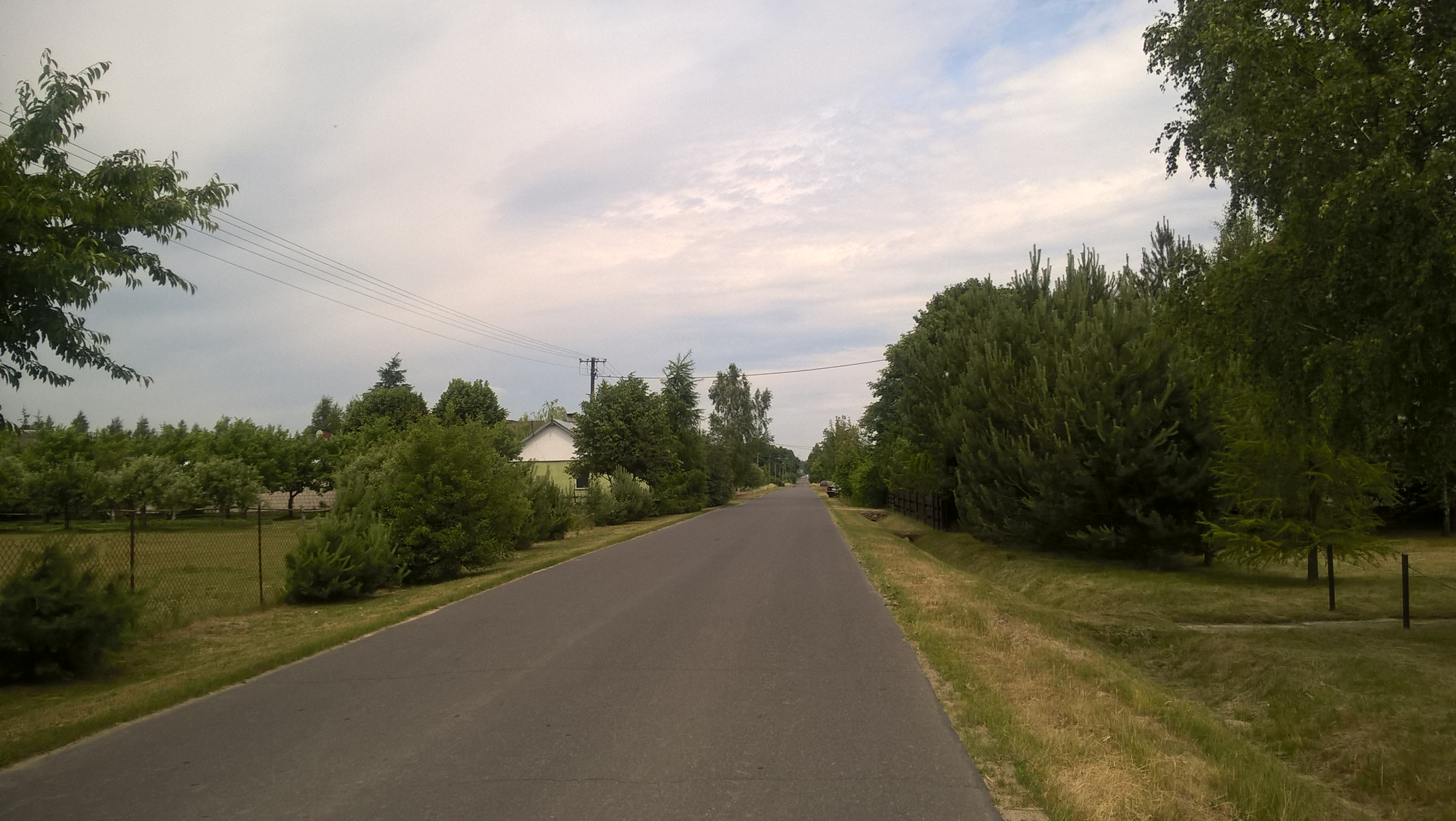

- Location within Poland
- Coordinates: 52°4′N 23°14′E
- Country: Poland
- Voivodeship: Lublin
- County: Biała
- Gmina: Biała Podlaska
- Time zone: UTC+1 (CET)
  - Summer (DST): UTC+2 (CEST)
- Vehicle registration: LBI
- Website: www.kalilow.prv.pl

Kaliłów [kaˈlʲiwuf] is a village in the administrative district of Gmina Biała Podlaska, within Biała County, Lublin Voivodeship, in eastern Poland.

== History ==
Following the joint German-Soviet invasion of Poland, which started World War II in September 1939, the village was occupied by Germany. From May to October 1941, the German administration operated the Stalag 307 prisoner-of-war camp in the village. About 13,000 of the 140,000 POWs died there, and afterwards the camp was relocated to Dęblin. In January 1943, the Germans pacified the village, murdering 23 inhabitants. It was a reprisal for the residents' aid to the POWs and resistance activities.
