= Kamieniczne =

- Village
- Location within Poland
- Coordinates: 52°05′24″N 23°10′08″E
- Country: Poland
- Voivodeship: Lublin
- County: Biała
- Gmina: Biała Podlaska
- Elevation: 140 m (460 ft)

Population
  - Total: 10

Kamieniczne [kamʲɛˈɲit͡ʂnɛ] is a village in the administrative district of Gmina Biała Podlaska, within Biała County, Lublin Voivodeship, in eastern Poland.
