= Tadeusz Kotz =

Polish fighter pilot

- Born: 9 August 1913; Grabanów, Russian Empire
- Died: 3 June 2008 (aged 94); Collingwood, Ontario, Canada
- Military career
- Allegiance: Poland; United Kingdom
- Branch: Polish Air Force; Royal Air Force
- Service years: 1939–1948
- Rank: Colonel
- Service number: P0696
- Units: No. 303 Polish Fighter Squadron; No. 308 Polish Fighter Squadron; No. 317 Polish Fighter Squadron; 161 Fighter Squadron
- Conflicts: Polish Defensive War, World War II
- Awards: Virtuti Militari; Cross of Valour; Distinguished Flying Cross (UK)

Tadeusz Kotz (9 August 1913 – 3 June 2008) was a Polish pilot and fighter ace of World War II. He was awarded several decorations, including Poland's Virtuti Militari, four times Cross of Valour and the British Distinguished Flying Cross. After the war he published his memoirs.

== Biography ==
He was born Tadeusz Koc in 1913 in Grabanów, then under Russian rule. His farming parents initially worked for a landowner, then farmed their own land in the village of Kłoda. After his general schooling, Tadeusz entered the cadet flying school in Dęblin. Later, he served in the Polish Air Force as a fighter pilot.

=== Combat service during second world war ===
After Nazi Germany and the Soviet Union invaded Poland in 1939, Kotz fought in the Polish 161st Fighter Escadrille air unit of Łódź Army. He shot down his first German Messerschmitt on 2 September 1939, and also shared in the destruction of a Junkers Ju-86 while piloting a PZL P.11 airplane. He was most probably the pilot, who shot down a Soviet reconnaissance bomber Polikarpov R-5 on 17 September near Stanisławów (it was confirmed in his immediate report, although he denied that he had attacked the bomber in his memoires written long after the war).

With Poland in defeat, Kotz was ordered to evacuate to Romania along with other pilots. He escaped via Yugoslavia and Greece to France, and then to England to serve with the Royal Air Force (RAF). Starting in late 1940, Kotz served with RAF squadrons 317, 308 and 303, flying the Spitfire.

Later, he became a squadron leader with No. 303 Squadron. On 3 February 1943, Kotz was shot down in combat with II./JG 26 over northern France. Parachuting down, he landed in a potato field a few kilometers from the German airport at Saint-Omer. He made contact with members of the French Resistance, who arranged his transport to Paris. Then, via Saint-Jean-de-Luz, the Pyrenees, San Sebastián and Madrid, Kotz reached British-controlled Gibraltar, from where he flew back to England. He reported to Northolt on 21 February, 18 days after getting shot out of the sky. The report of his escape, along with a copy of his combat report dated 3 February 1943, was held classified and put on a secret list until 1973. In September 1944, he attended the Aviation School in Weston-super-Mare. His wartime score was three planes destroyed and three shared-destroyed, two probable destructions, and three damaged.

=== Post-war life ===
Kotz was demobilized in 1948. He married and settled in Swaziland in Africa and then moved to Collingwood, Ontario, Canada, where he spent the remainder of his life. While in Canada, he published a book of memoirs. Błękitne niebo i prawdziwe kule (Blue Sky and Real Bullets), in 2005. He died on 3 June 2008 at a nursing home in Collingwood, aged 94. He was buried at Saint Mary’s Roman Catholic Cemetery in Collingwood.

=== Awards ===
Virtuti Militari Silver Cross
Cross of Valour four times
Distinguished Flying Cross

== Bibliography ==
- Kotz, Tadeusz. "Błękitne niebo i prawdziwe kule", Toronto, 2005, Ontario Limited.
- Izydor Koliński: Wojsko Polskie : krótki informator historyczny o Wojsku Polskim w latach II wojny światowej. 9, Regularne jednostki Wojska Polskiego (lotnictwo), formowanie, działania bojowe, organizacja, uzbrojenie, metryki jednostek lotniczych. Warszawa : Wydawnictwo Ministerstwa Obrony Narodowej 1978.
- Tadeusz Jerzy Krzystek, Anna Krzystek: Polskie Siły Powietrzne w Wielkiej Brytanii w latach 1940–1947 łącznie z Pomocniczą Lotniczą Służbą Kobiet (PLSK-WAAF). Sandomierz: Stratus, 2012, s. 280. ISBN 9788361421597
- Piotr Sikora: Asy polskiego lotnictwa. Warszawa: Oficyna Wydawnicza Alma-Press. 2014, s. 394. ISBN 9788370205607
- Jerzy Pawlak: Absolwenci Szkoły Orląt: 1925–1939. Warszawa: Retro-Art, 2009, s. 167. ISBN 8387992224
