= Woskrzenice Duże =

- Village
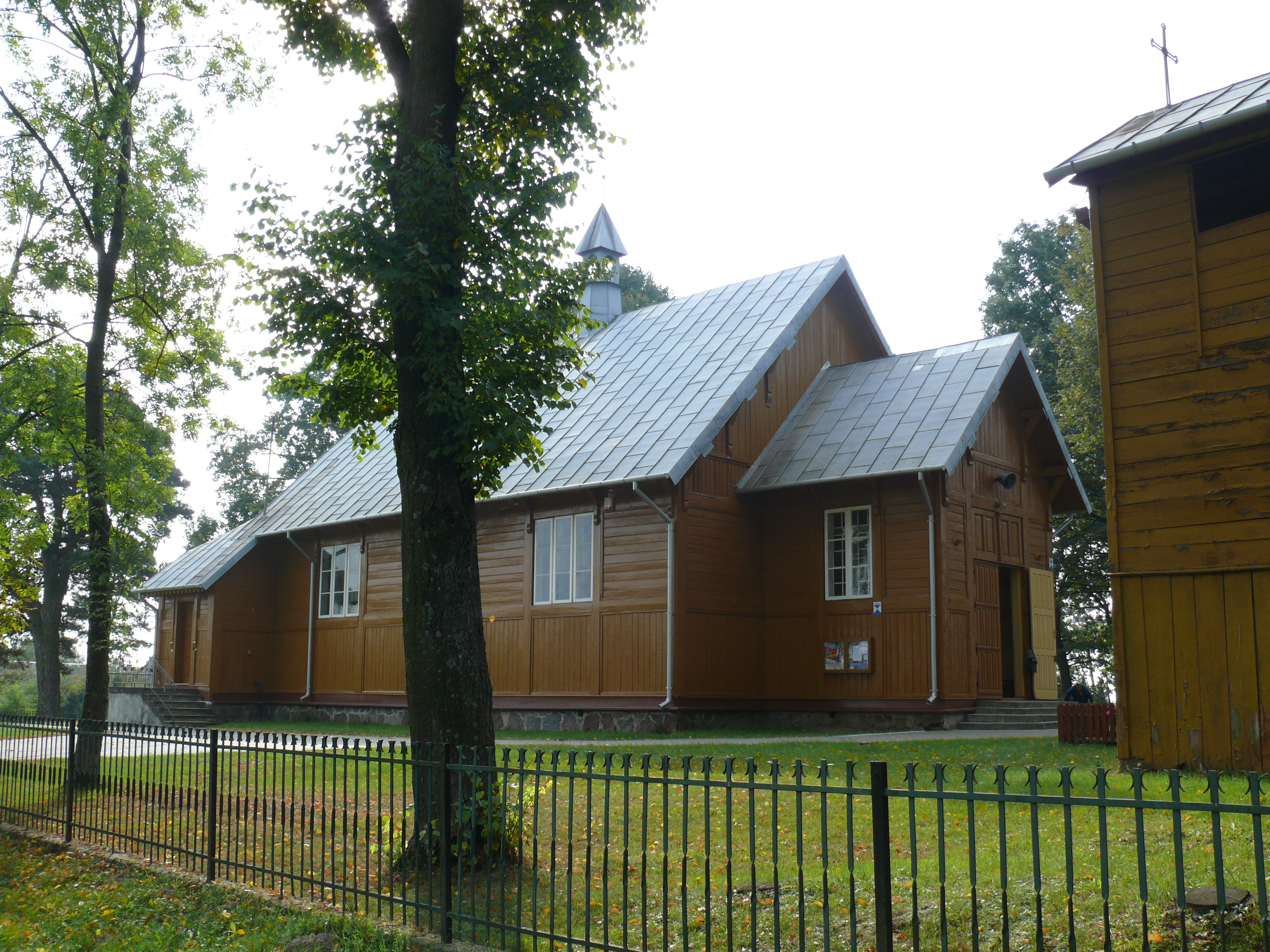

- Location within Poland
- Coordinates: 52°02′39″N 23°15′27″E
- Country: Poland
- Voivodeship: Lublin
- County: Biała
- Gmina: Biała Podlaska

Woskrzenice Duże [vɔskʂɛˈɲit͡sɛ ˈduʐɛ] is a village in the administrative district of Gmina Biała Podlaska, in Biała County, Lublin Voivodeship, in eastern Poland.
