= Grabanów-Kolonia =

- Village
- Location within Poland
- Coordinates: 52°03′36″N 23°10′56″E
- Country: Poland
- Voivodeship: Lublin
- County: Biała
- Gmina: Biała Podlaska

Grabanów-Kolonia [ɡraˈbanuf kɔˈlɔɲa] is a village in the administrative district of Gmina Biała Podlaska, within Biała County, Lublin Voivodeship, in eastern Poland.
