= Dokudów Drugi =

- Village
- Location within Poland
- Coordinates: 51°59′35″N 23°13′50″E
- Country: Poland
- Voivodeship: Lublin
- County: Biała
- Gmina: Biała Podlaska

Dokudów Drugi [dɔˈkuduf ˈdruɡʲi] is a village in the administrative district of Gmina Biała Podlaska, within Biała County, Lublin Voivodeship, in eastern Poland.
