= Zabłocie, Gmina Biała Podlaska =

Zabłocie
- Village
- Location within Poland
- Coordinates: 52°3′49″N 22°55′30″E
- Country: Poland
- Voivodeship: Lublin
- County: Biała
- Gmina: Biała Podlaska

Zabłocie [zaˈbwɔt͡ɕɛ] is a village in the administrative district of Gmina Biała Podlaska, within Biała County, Lublin Voivodeship, in eastern Poland.
