= Mokre, Gmina Rossosz =

Mokre
- Village
- Location within Poland
- Coordinates: 51°51′1″N 23°4′37″E
- Country: Poland
- Voivodeship: Lublin
- County: Biała
- Gmina: Rossosz

Mokre [ˈmɔkrɛ] is a village in the administrative district of Gmina Rossosz, within Biała County, Lublin Voivodeship, in eastern Poland.
