= Dobryń-Kolonia =

- Village
- Location within Poland
- Coordinates: 52°4′27″N 23°29′24″E
- Country: Poland
- Voivodeship: Lublin
- County: Biała
- Gmina: Zalesie

Dobryń-Kolonia [ˈdɔbrɨɲ kɔˈlɔɲa] is a village in the administrative district of Gmina Zalesie, within Biała County, Lublin Voivodeship, in eastern Poland.
