= Pojelce =

- Village
- Location within Poland
- Coordinates: 52°5′51″N 22°55′58″E
- Country: Poland
- Voivodeship: Lublin
- County: Biała
- Gmina: Biała Podlaska

Pojelce [pɔˈjɛlt͡sɛ] is a village in the administrative district of Gmina Biała Podlaska, within Biała County, Lublin Voivodeship, in eastern Poland.
