= Sławacinek Stary =

- Village
- Location within Poland
- Coordinates: 52°1′53″N 23°4′25″E
- Country: Poland
- Voivodeship: Lublin
- County: Biała
- Gmina: Biała Podlaska
- Elevation: 150 m (490 ft)

Population (approx.)
  - Total: 1,000

Sławacinek Stary [ˈswavaˈt͡ɕinɛk starɨ] is a village in the administrative district of Gmina Biała Podlaska, within Biała County, Lublin Voivodeship, in eastern Poland.

The village's former name (Stary Sławacinek) was officially used until 1 January 2014.
