= Jaźwiny, Lublin Voivodeship =

Jaźwiny
- Village
- Location within Poland
- Coordinates: 51°59′17″N 23°1′50″E
- Country: Poland
- Voivodeship: Lublin
- County: Biała
- Gmina: Biała Podlaska
- Time zone: UTC+1 (CET)
  - Summer (DST): UTC+2 (CEST)

Jaźwiny [jaʑˈvʲinɨ] is a village in the administrative district of Gmina Biała Podlaska, within Biała County, Lublin Voivodeship, in eastern Poland.

== History ==
11 Polish citizens were murdered by Nazi Germany in the village during World War II.
