= Roskosz =

- Village
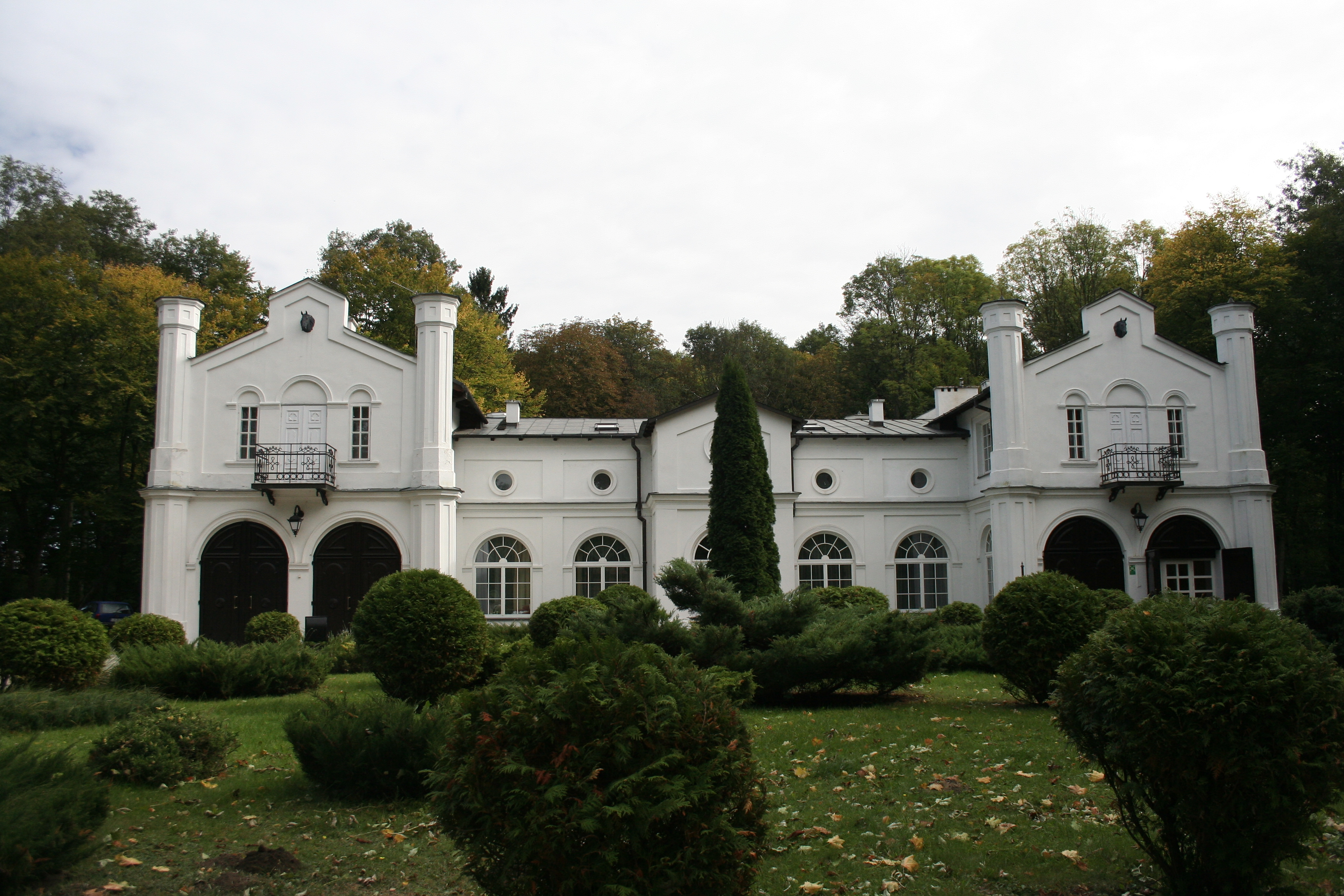

- Location within Poland
- Coordinates: 52°05′06″N 23°08′11″E
- Country: Poland
- Voivodeship: Lublin
- County: Biała
- Gmina: Biała Podlaska

Roskosz [ˈrɔskɔʂ] is a village in the administrative district of Gmina Biała Podlaska, within Biała County, Lublin Voivodeship, in eastern Poland.

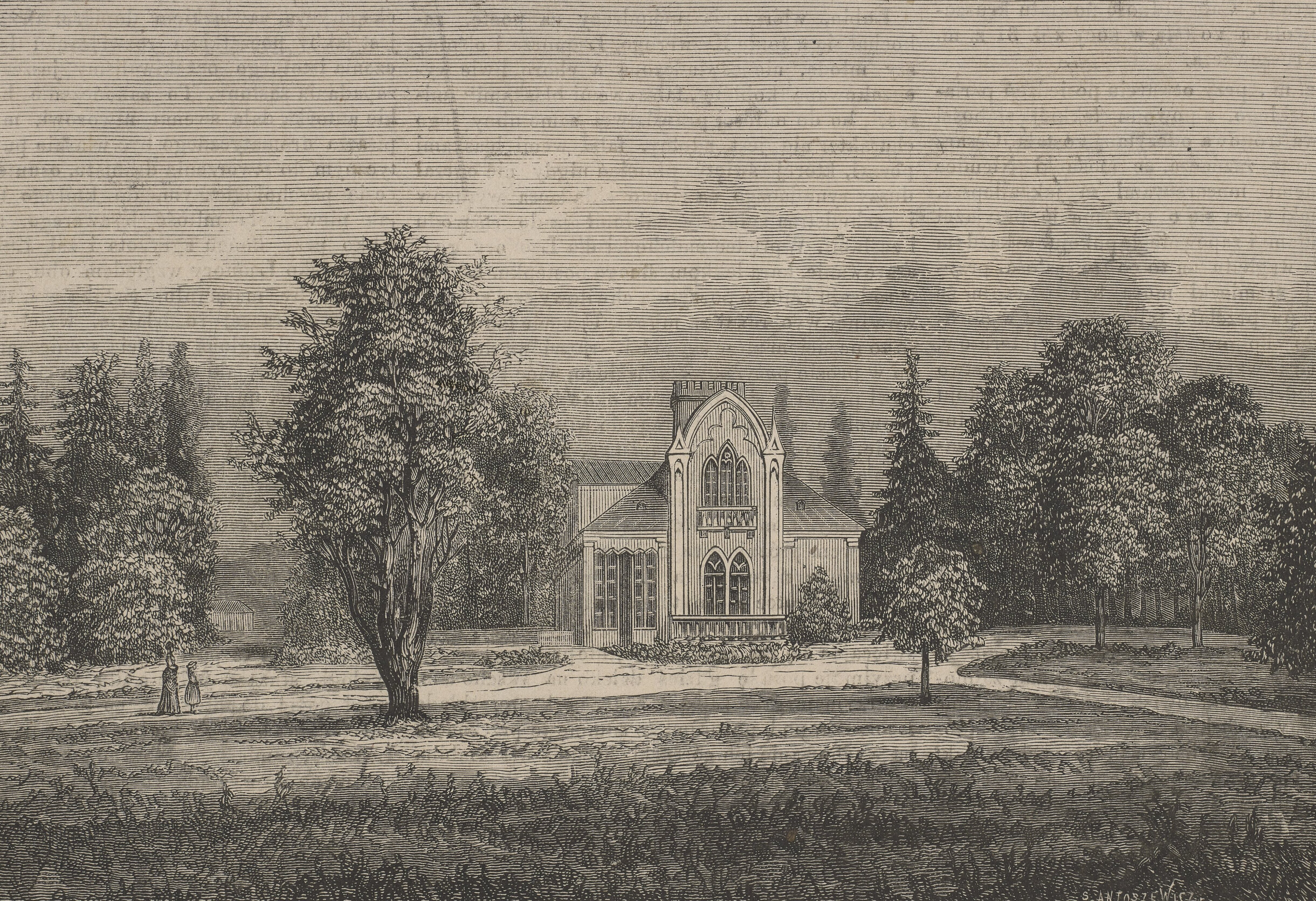
Palace, 1876
