= Horbów =

- Village
- Location within Poland
- Coordinates: 52°3′N 23°20′E
- Country: Poland
- Voivodeship: Lublin
- County: Biała
- Gmina: Zalesie

Horbów [ˈxɔrbuf] is a village in the administrative district of Gmina Zalesie, within Biała County, Lublin Voivodeship, in eastern Poland.

== See also ==
- Church of the Transfiguration, Horbów
