= Dobryń Mały =

- Village
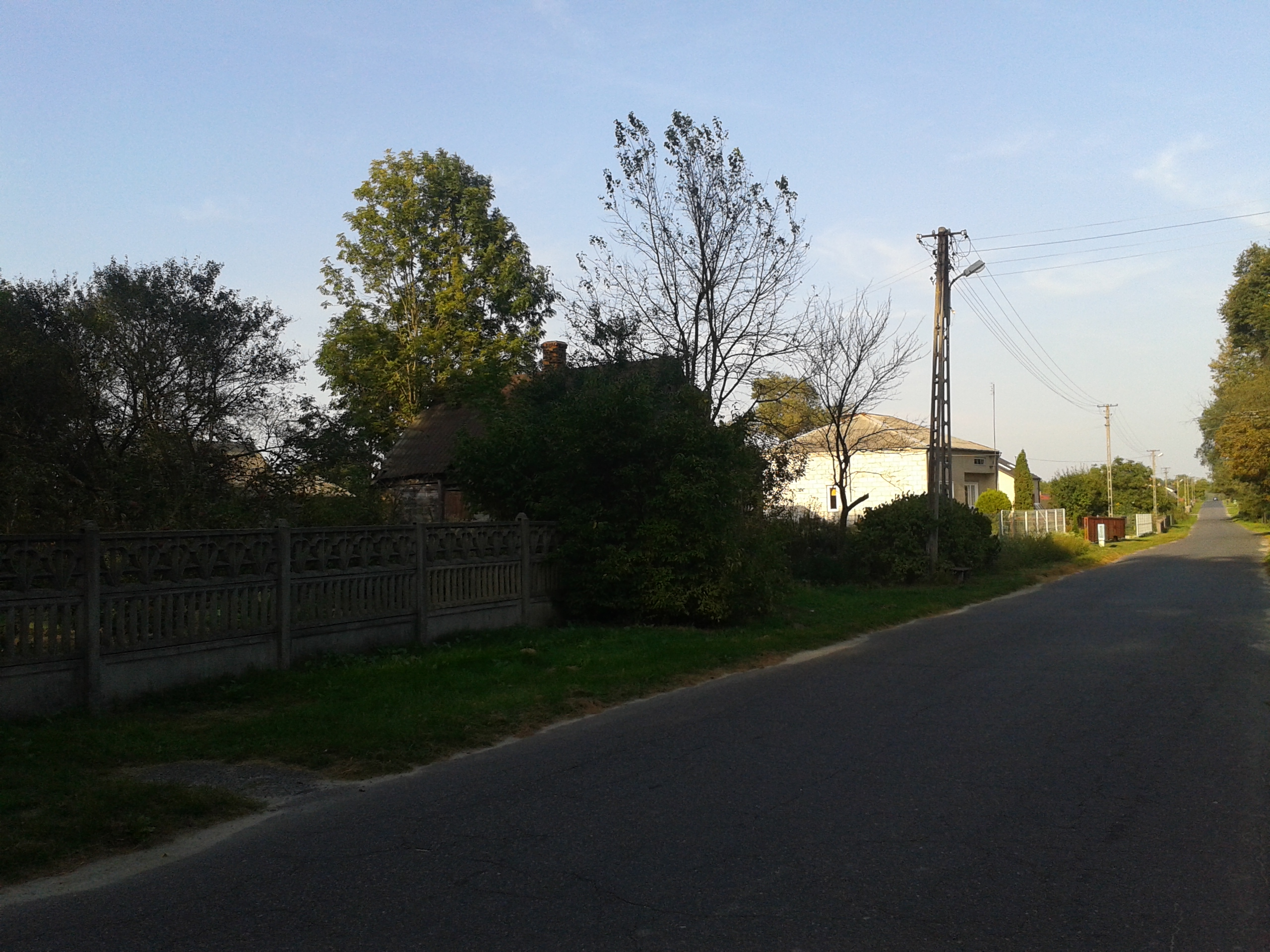

- Location within Poland
- Coordinates: 52°3′N 23°24′E
- Country: Poland
- Voivodeship: Lublin
- County: Biała
- Gmina: Zalesie
- Time zone: UTC+1 (CET)
  - Summer (DST): UTC+2 (CEST)

Dobryń Mały [ˈdɔbrɨɲ ˈmawɨ] is a village in the administrative district of Gmina Zalesie, within Biała County, Lublin Voivodeship, in eastern Poland.

== History ==
Three Polish citizens were murdered by Nazi Germany in the village during World War II.
