= Sitnik =

- Village
- Location within Poland
- Coordinates: 52°4′N 23°2′E
- Country: Poland
- Voivodeship: Lublin
- County: Biała
- Gmina: Biała Podlaska
- Time zone: UTC+1 (CET)
  - Summer (DST): UTC+2 (CEST)

Sitnik [ˈɕitɲik] is a village in the administrative district of Gmina Biała Podlaska, within Biała County, Lublin Voivodeship, in eastern Poland.

== History ==
18 Polish citizens were murdered by Nazi Germany in the village during World War II.
