= Pólko, Gmina Biała Podlaska =

Pólko
- Village
- Location within Poland
- Coordinates: 52°04′32″N 22°57′45″E
- Country: Poland
- Voivodeship: Lublin
- County: Biała
- Gmina: Biała Podlaska

Pólko [ˈpulkɔ] is a village in the administrative district of Gmina Biała Podlaska, within Biała County, Lublin Voivodeship, in eastern Poland.
