= Ortel Książęcy Pierwszy =

- Village
- Location within Poland
- Coordinates: 51°58′22″N 23°14′49″E
- Country: Poland
- Voivodeship: Lublin
- County: Biała
- Gmina: Biała Podlaska

Population
  - Total: 140

Ortel Książęcy Pierwszy [ˈɔrtɛl kɕɔ̃ˈʐɛnt͡sɨ ˈpʲɛrfʂɨ] is a village in the administrative district of Gmina Biała Podlaska, within Biała County, Lublin Voivodeship, in eastern Poland.
