= Cicibór Duży =

- Village
- Location within Poland
- Coordinates: 52°5′N 23°7′E
- Country: Poland
- Voivodeship: Lublin
- County: Biała
- Gmina: Biała Podlaska

Population
  - Total: 540
- Time zone: UTC+1 (CET)
  - Summer (DST): UTC+2 (CEST)

Cicibór Duży [t͡ɕiˈt͡ɕibur ˈduʐɨ] is a village in the administrative district of Gmina Biała Podlaska, within Biała County, Lublin Voivodeship, in eastern Poland.

== History ==
83 Polish citizens were murdered by Nazi Germany in the village during World War II.
