= Gmina Zalesie =

Gmina Zalesie Zalesie Commune
- Gmina
- Coat of arms
- Interactive map of Gmina Zalesie
- Coordinates (Zalesie): 52°2′N 23°22′E
- Country: Poland
- Voivodeship: Lublin
- County: Biała County
- Seat: Zalesie

Area
  - Total: 147.16 km^{2} (56.82 sq mi)

Population (2014)
  - Total: 4,427
  - Density: 30.08/km^{2} (77.91/sq mi)
- Website: http://www.zalesie.pl

Gmina Zalesie is a rural gmina (administrative district) in Biała County, Lublin Voivodeship, in eastern Poland. Its seat is the village of Zalesie, which lies approximately 18 kilometres (11 mi) east of Biała Podlaska and 104 km (65 mi) north-east of the regional capital Lublin.

The gmina covers an area of 147.16 square kilometres (56.8 sq mi), and as of 2006 its total population is 4,566 (4,427 in 2014).

== Villages ==
Gmina Zalesie contains the villages and settlements of Berezówka, Dereczanka, Dobryń Duży, Dobryń Mały, Dobryń-Kolonia, Horbów, Horbów-Kolonia, Kijowiec, Kijowiec-Kolonia, Kłoda Duża, Kłoda Mała, Koczukówka, Lachówka Duża, Lachówka Mała, Malowa Góra, Nowosiółki, Wólka Dobryńska and Zalesie.

== Neighbouring gminas ==
Gmina Zalesie is bordered by the gminas of Biała Podlaska, Piszczac, Rokitno and Terespol.
