= Woroniec, Gmina Biała Podlaska =

Woroniec
- Village
- Location within Poland
- Coordinates: 52°3′N 22°55′E
- Country: Poland
- Voivodeship: Lublin
- County: Biała
- Gmina: Biała Podlaska

Population (approx.)
  - Total: 420

Woroniec [vɔˈrɔɲɛt͡s] is a village in the administrative district of Gmina Biała Podlaska, within Biała County, Lublin Voivodeship, in eastern Poland.

A monument in memory of the fallen American pilots in World War II was built near the village, at the site of Boeing B-17 plane crash in 1944.
