= Rossosz, Gmina Rossosz =

Rossosz
- Village
- Location within Poland
- Coordinates: 51°51′N 23°8′E
- Country: Poland
- Voivodeship: Lublin
- County: Biała
- Gmina: Rossosz

Population
  - Total: 1,000

Rossosz [ˈrɔsːɔʂ] is a village in Biała County, Lublin Voivodeship, Poland. It is the seat of the gmina (administrative district) called Gmina Rossosz.

Rossosz dates back to the 13th century, when it was a small settlement, which in the early 14th century became a royal property. In the early 15th century, it was handed over to the Polubinski family, and probably in the mid-16th century, it was granted town charter, with a permission for a weekly market and two annual fairs. Rossosz was located along a route from Kraków to Vilnius, and frequently changed owners. In early 17th century, it belonged to Stanislaw Koniecpolski, who in 1624 sold it to Mikolaj Firlej. In 1640 Rossosz burned in a great fire. The newly rebuilt town was completely ransacked and burned to the ground by Swedes and Transilvanians in Swedish invasion of Poland (1655–1660).

In 1815–1915 Rossosz belonged to Russian-controlled Congress Poland, and during the January Uprising, a skirmish between Russians and Polish rebels took place here. Rossosz lost its town charter in 1870.
