= Zalesie, Gmina Zalesie =

Zalesie
- Village
- Location within Poland
- Coordinates: 52°2′N 23°22′E
- Country: Poland
- Voivodeship: Lublin
- County: Biała
- Gmina: Zalesie

Zalesie [zaˈlɛɕɛ] is a village in Biała County, Lublin Voivodeship, in eastern Poland. It is the seat of the gmina (administrative district) called Gmina Zalesie.
