= Grabanów =

- Village
- Location within Poland
- Coordinates: 52°3′53″N 23°9′5″E
- Country: Poland
- Voivodeship: Lublin
- County: Biała
- Gmina: Biała Podlaska
- Elevation: 155 m (509 ft)

Population
  - Total: 270

Grabanów [ɡraˈbanuf] is a village in the administrative district of Gmina Biała Podlaska, within Biała County, Lublin Voivodeship, in eastern Poland.
