= Church of the Transfiguration, Horbów =

Church in Horbów, Poland

Church of the Transfiguration
- Kościół Przemienienia Pańskiego
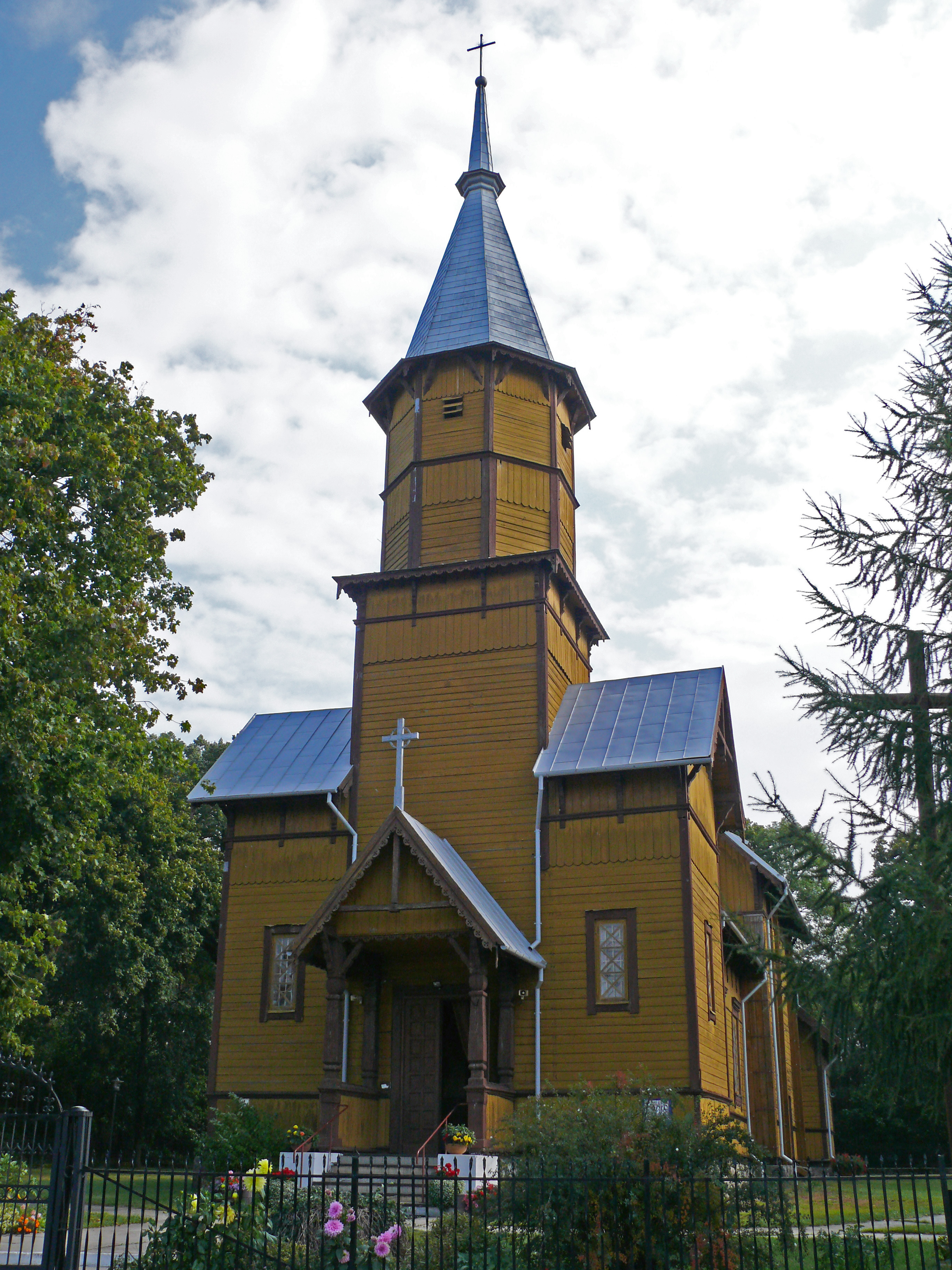
- Church of the Transfiguration
- 52°02′52″N 23°20′00″E
- Location: Horbów; Poland
- Denomination: Catholicism
- Previous denomination: Eastern Orthodoxy
- Churchmanship: Catholic Church

History
- Status: active church
- Dedication: Transfiguration of Jesus
- Dedicated: August 17, 1908

Architecture
- Architect: Vladimir Pokrovsky
- Completed: 1908

Specifications
- Materials: wood

Administration
- Parish: Parish of the Transfiguration in Horbów

Church of the Transfiguration in Horbów is a Roman Catholic parish church in Horbów, built at the beginning of the 20th century as an Orthodox church.

In the 16th century, Horbów had an Orthodox parish, which, after 1596 and at the latest before 1687, transitioned to the Uniate Church. In 1687 and again in 1772 or 1854, new Uniate religious buildings were erected on the site of the original temple. In 1875, as part of the Conversion of Chełm Eparchy, the Horbów parish was incorporated into the Eparchy of Warsaw of the Russian Orthodox Church, which was met with protests from the local population. At the beginning of the 20th century, the dilapidated church was demolished, and a new religious building was erected in its place, consecrated in 1908 by the Bishop of Chełm, Eulogius Georgiyevsky. It only served its original function for seven years, as in 1915, the local Orthodox population left for exile. In 1923, the church was taken over by the Roman Catholic Church as part of the restitution of Orthodox churches in the Second Polish Republic. The building was renovated to meet the requirements of the Latin liturgy; a new main altar was constructed using parts of the iconostasis. The church's furnishings include 18th- and 19th-century liturgical items, alongside 20th-century elements.

== History ==
=== First churches in Horbów ===
The Orthodox parish in Horbów was founded before 1516, with a report from that year mentioning the construction of a church for the existing pastoral facility. According to Adam Bobryk and Izabela Kochan, both the Orthodox and Catholic parishes in Horbów were established simultaneously, which would suggest that the Orthodox parish was founded before 1446. The pastoral facility adopted the Union of Brest before 1687, as evidenced by a document from that year confirming funds, issued by Tomasz Kazimierz Łuzecki, who had been the owner of Horbów estates for 13 years.

The second Uniate church in Horbów was built in 1687. The third church of this denomination was erected in the village in 1772 or 1854, with sources consistently stating that it was a wooden structure. Since 1812, the church held a particularly venerated image of the Holy Virgin of Horbów, which had previously been kept in the parish church of Saints John the Evangelist, Nicholas, and Barbara, but was moved to the church after the parish church was damaged by Russian troops.

In 1875, after the Conversion of Chełm Eparchy, the Horbów church was transferred to the parish of the Russian Orthodox Church. In 1878, the Marian icon was removed from the church and transferred to St. Anne’s Church in Biała Podlaska, where it remained until 1924. The locals in Horbów resisted being forced to convert to Orthodoxy. The local parson, Father Emilian Starkiewicz, opposed the liturgical changes leading up to the dissolution of the union and encouraged the faithful not to comply with the orders of the Russian authorities. He also administered sacraments to Uniates from other parishes. Due to his stance, the priest was removed from his post and replaced by a clergyman from Galicia, who fully accepted the actions of the Russian administration. As a result of the resistance, the army was sent to Horbów, and those refusing conversion were subjected to penalties.

=== Early 20th century temple ===
==== Orthodox church ====
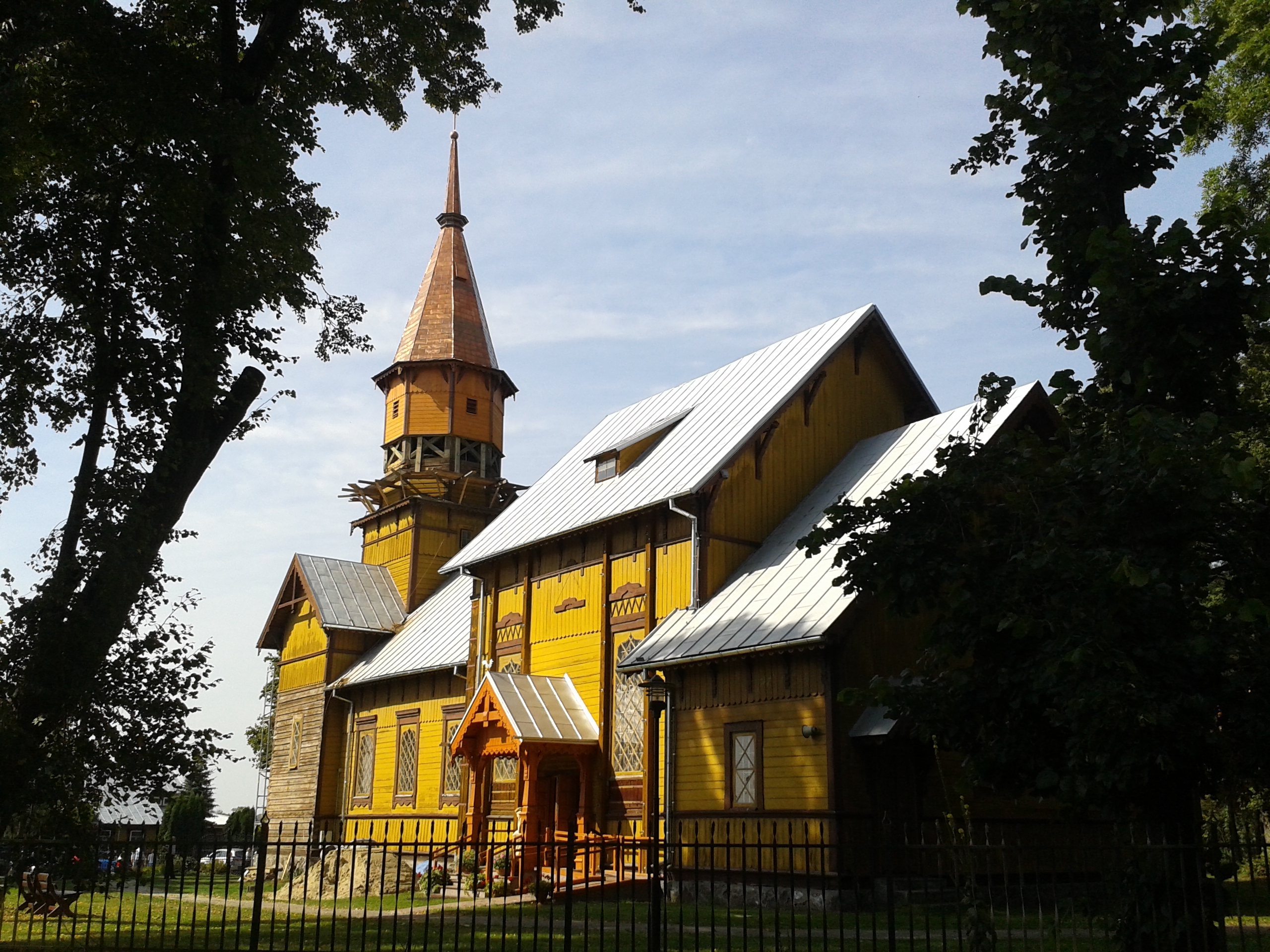
View of the temple from the southeast side

Due to the poor technical condition of the sacred building, it was dismantled in 1904. In its place, a new church was built, designed by the diocesan architect Vladimir Pokrovsky. The completed church was consecrated on 17 August 1908 by the Bishop of Chełm, Eulogius Georgiyevsky. The iconostasis and side icons for the church were created at the Kyiv Pechersk Lavra.

The church was abandoned when the Orthodox inhabitants of Horbów went into exile in 1915. The building was also damaged during military operations that year. After World War I ended, in 1923, the church was returned to the Catholic Church and became a Roman Catholic church. At that time, Orthodox Christians were a minority (one-third) of Horbów's population, and they no longer had a separate temple in the village, although in 1929, Metropolitan Dionysius Waledyński of Warsaw and all Poland sought approval from the Ministry of Religious Affairs and Public Education to establish a branch parish.

==== Catholic church ====
The new owners immediately after the reversion rebuilt the church, giving it a new architectural design. During the interwar period, the church in Horbów was renovated three more times. In 1927, its interior and roof were transformed, between 1932 and 1933 the foundations were renewed, and in 1938 the tower was rebuilt. Further renovations took place in 1942 and between 1945 and 1946, also focusing on the roof reconstruction. In 1952, the galleries at the side entrances were removed, the tower was restored, the interiors were re-clad, and new paintings were added. Smaller renovations occurred in 1961, 1967, 1975, and 1981, while a major renovation took place from 2003 to 2005, when the side altars were restored.

In 1924, the icon of Our Lady of Horbów was solemnly returned to the church.

== Architecture ==
=== Building structure ===
The church is made of wood and sits on a stone foundation. It is oriented, with a tripartite structure featuring a single nave on a rectangular plan, a rectangular church porch, and a rectangular chancel, which has two attached sacristies. Above the church porch rises a two-story tower: the lower part is embedded in the front façade, while the upper part is octagonal. The tower is topped with a tented roof and a spire. The building has sheet metal gable roofs supported by crooks. The church's façade is three-arched, and the entrance is rectangular, preceded by a porch supported by two columns, with rectangular windows on either side. The windows on the side walls of the former church are framed with wooden boards.

=== Interior ===
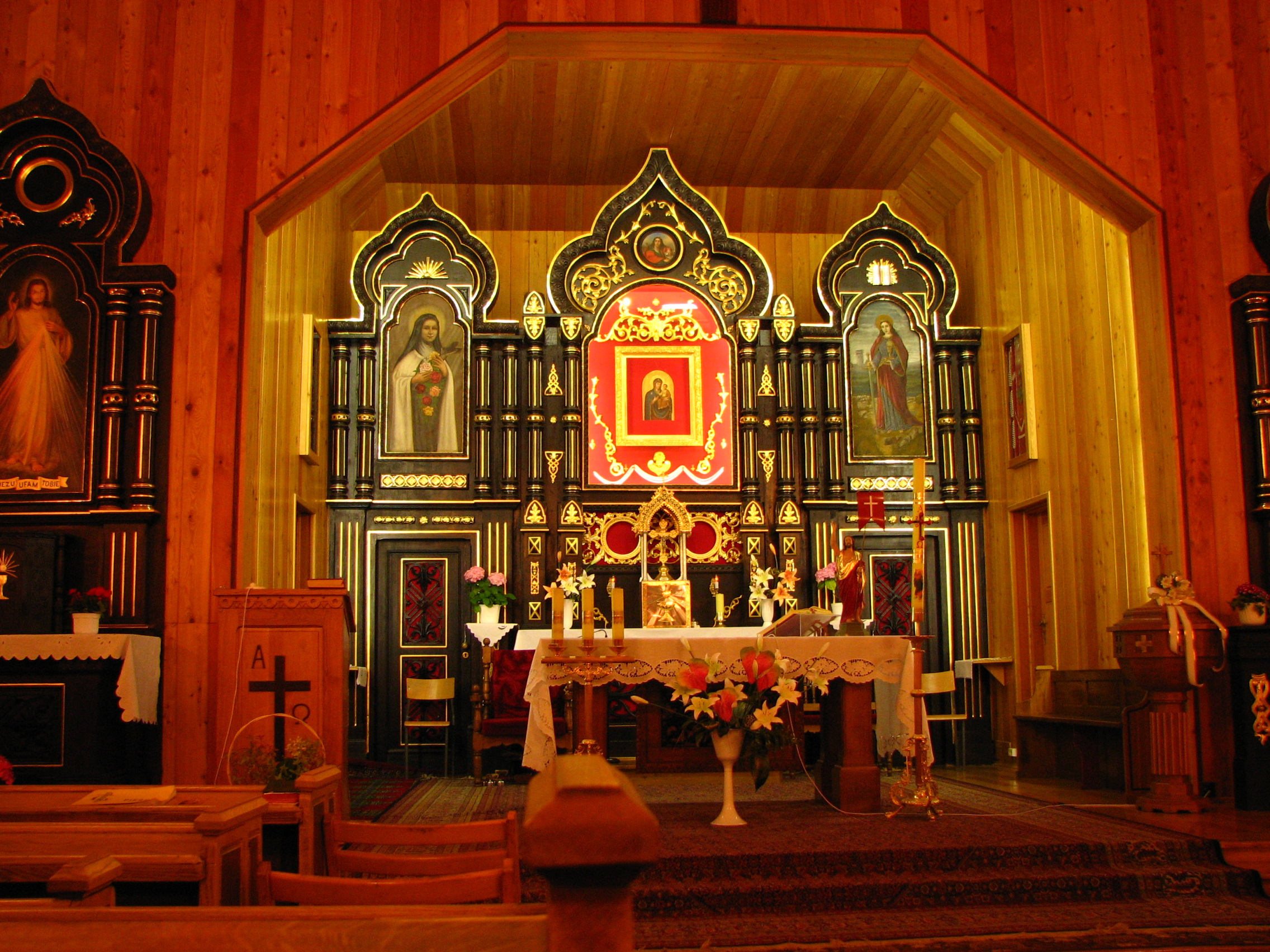
Main altar

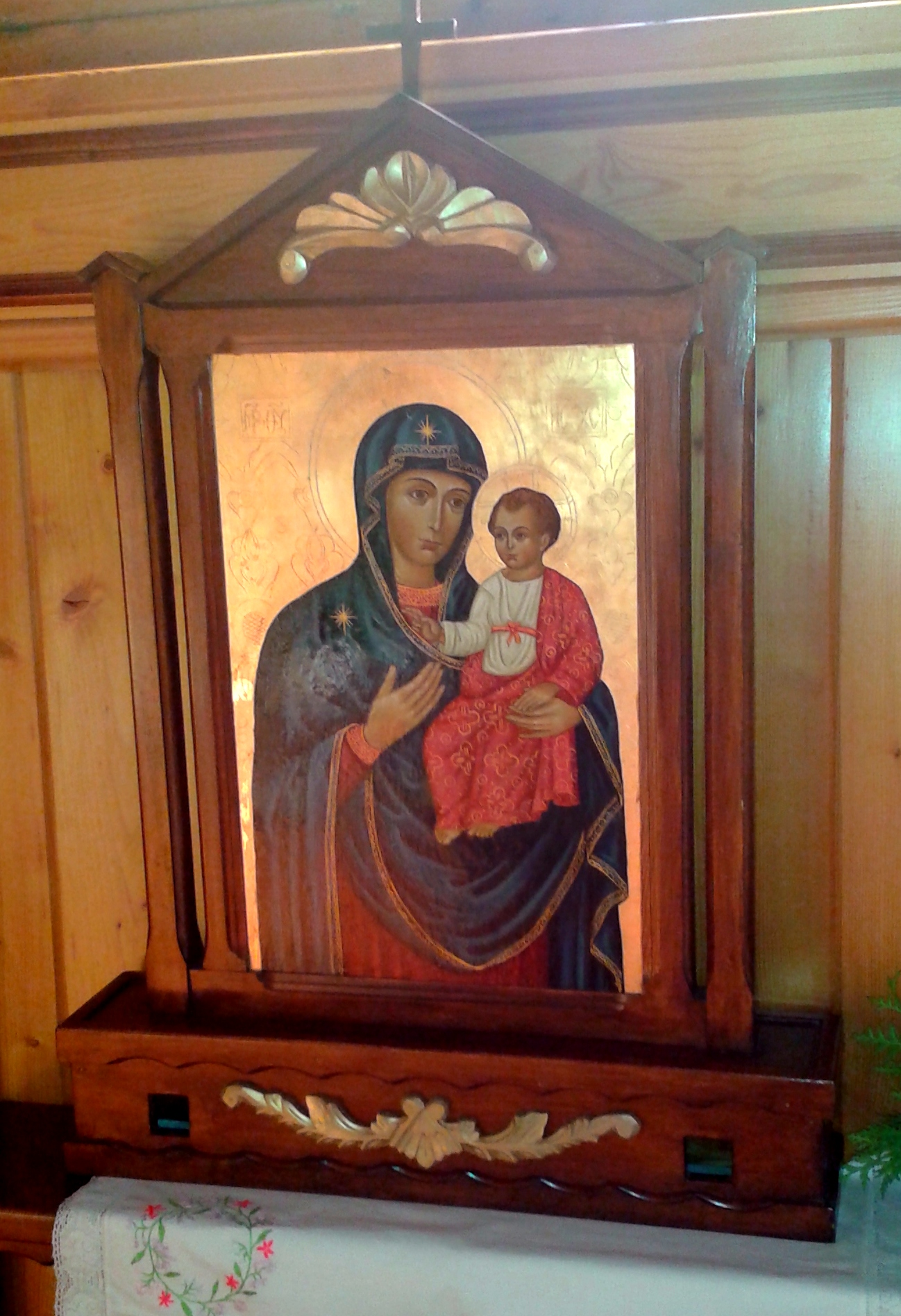
Copy of the image of Our Lady of Horbów on a festal icon stand

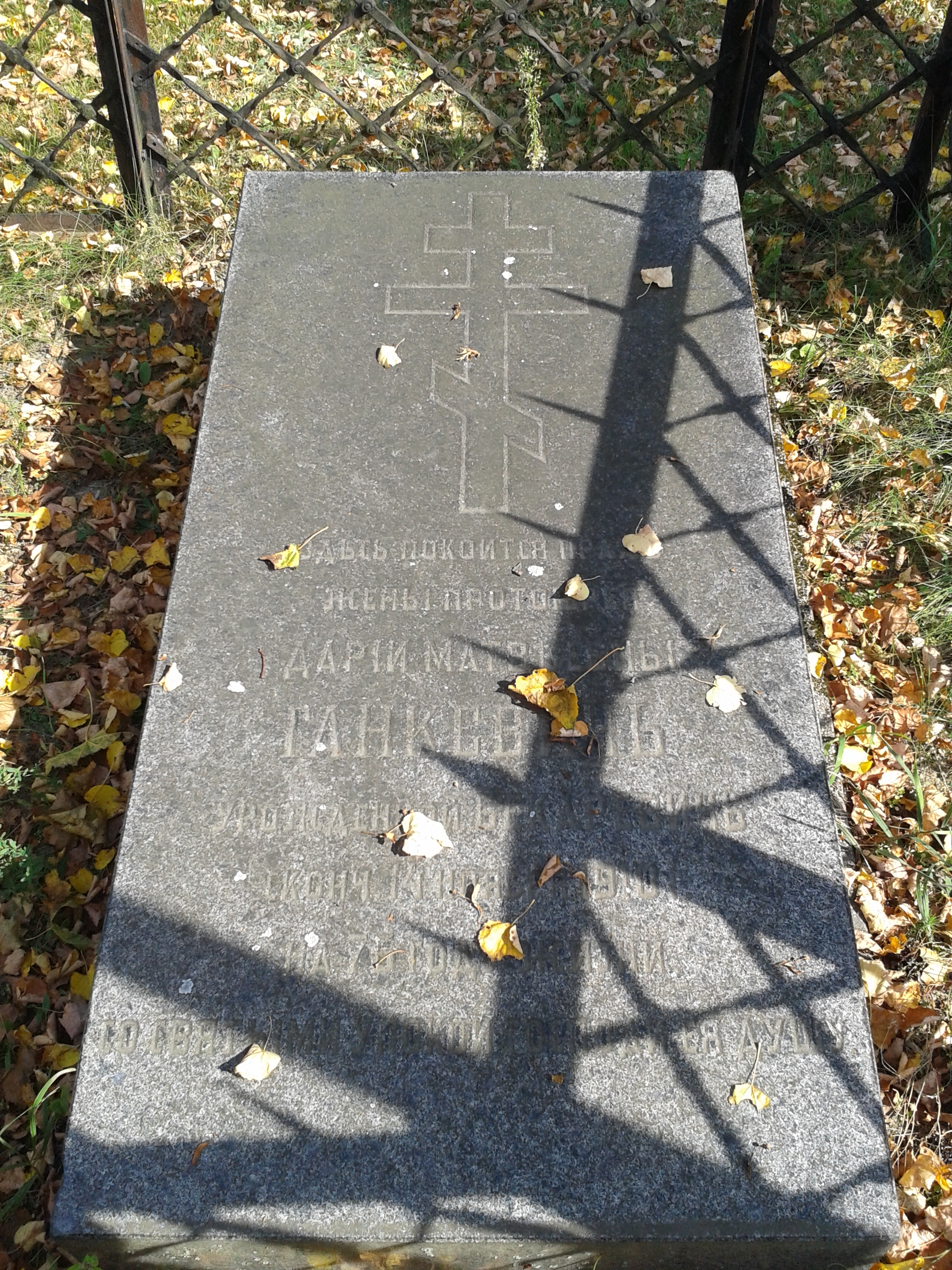
Grave of Daria Gankiewicz

The main altar in the church is constructed in the style of the former church's iconostasis, incorporating its elements; it has been in this form since 2004. A notable feature is an icon of St. John the Evangelist from the early 20th century, preserved in the altar. New additions for the church include a painting of Thérèse of Lisieux, created in 1937 by Józef Bołtuć, and one of St. Barbara from 1939 by Jan Popiel. The altar also displays the icon of Our Lady of Horbów, which, according to tradition, was created in 1516 and conserved in 2001. The image exhibits distinct characteristics of iconographic painting and is close to the Hodegetria type. The church houses two other icons from the former church furnishings: Christ the Risen and the Mother of God, both created in the early 20th century. Additionally, there is a painting depicting the Adoration of the Shepherds, likely from the first half of the 20th century. An older folk crucifix, dating to the first half of the previous century, is also part of the collection.

A choir is located on the western side of the church. The ceiling of the nave and the chancel is adorned with paintings. Scenes in the chancel and above the chancel arch were created by Regina Kondracka in 1952, while the paintings on the nave ceiling were executed by Father Stanisław Borysiak and Stefan Just in 1967.

The church is also equipped with historic liturgical vessels: an 18th-century Baroque chalice with an eight-petaled base and an ornate floral basket, and a chalice from the turn of the 19th and 20th centuries in the Gothic Revival style. The first monstrance kept in the church was made in the second half of the 19th century, with a second dating from the end of that century or the beginning of the next.

== Surroundings ==
In the vicinity of the church was originally a Russian Orthodox cemetery, from which a single grave marker remains: that of Daria Gankiewicz, the wife of the local Orthodox clergyman. There is another cemetery in Horbów, originally Uniate, later Russian Orthodox, and currently Roman Catholic.
