= Gmina Biała Podlaska =

Gmina Biała Podlaska Biała Podlaska Commune
- Gmina
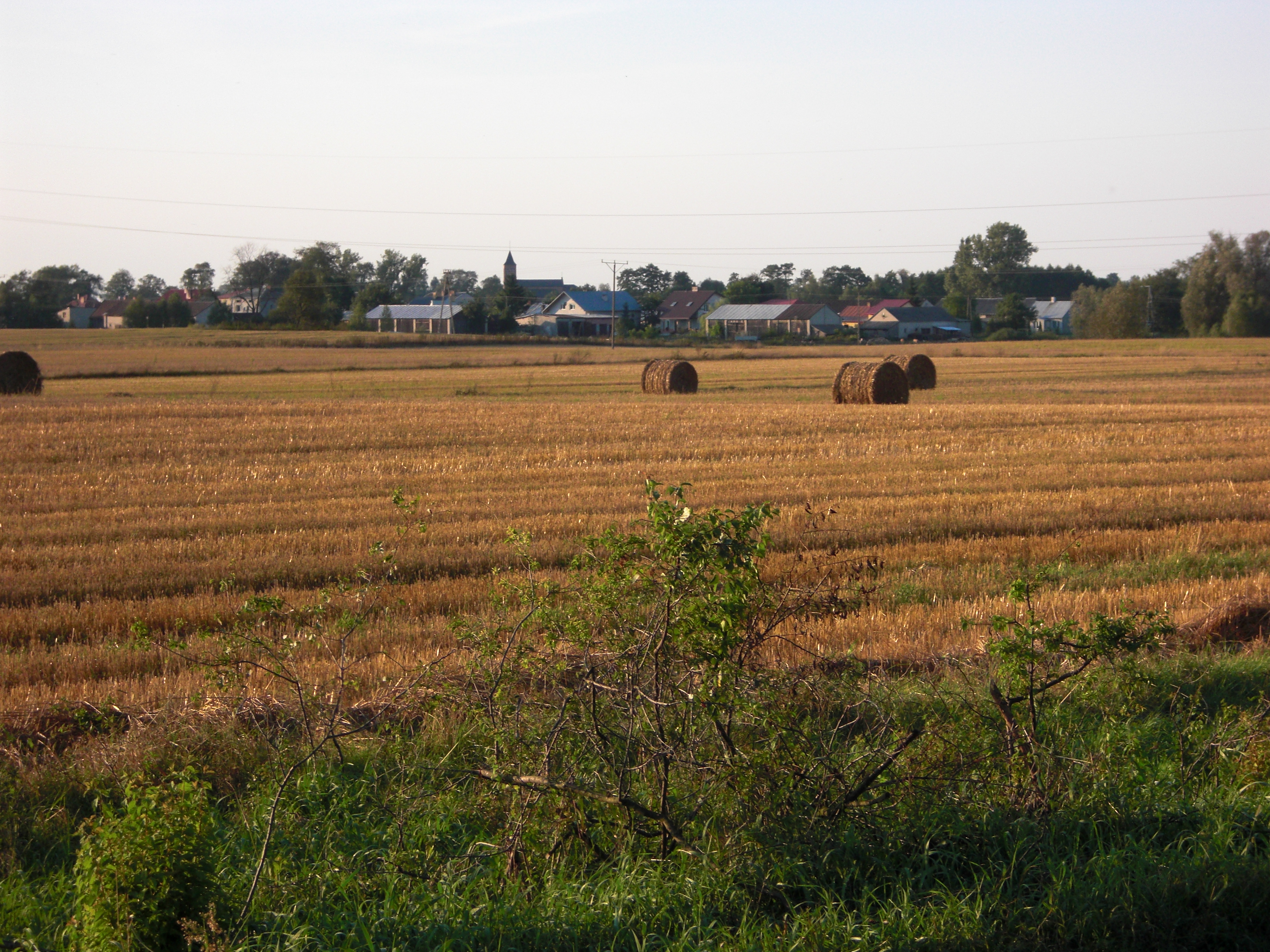

- Coat of arms

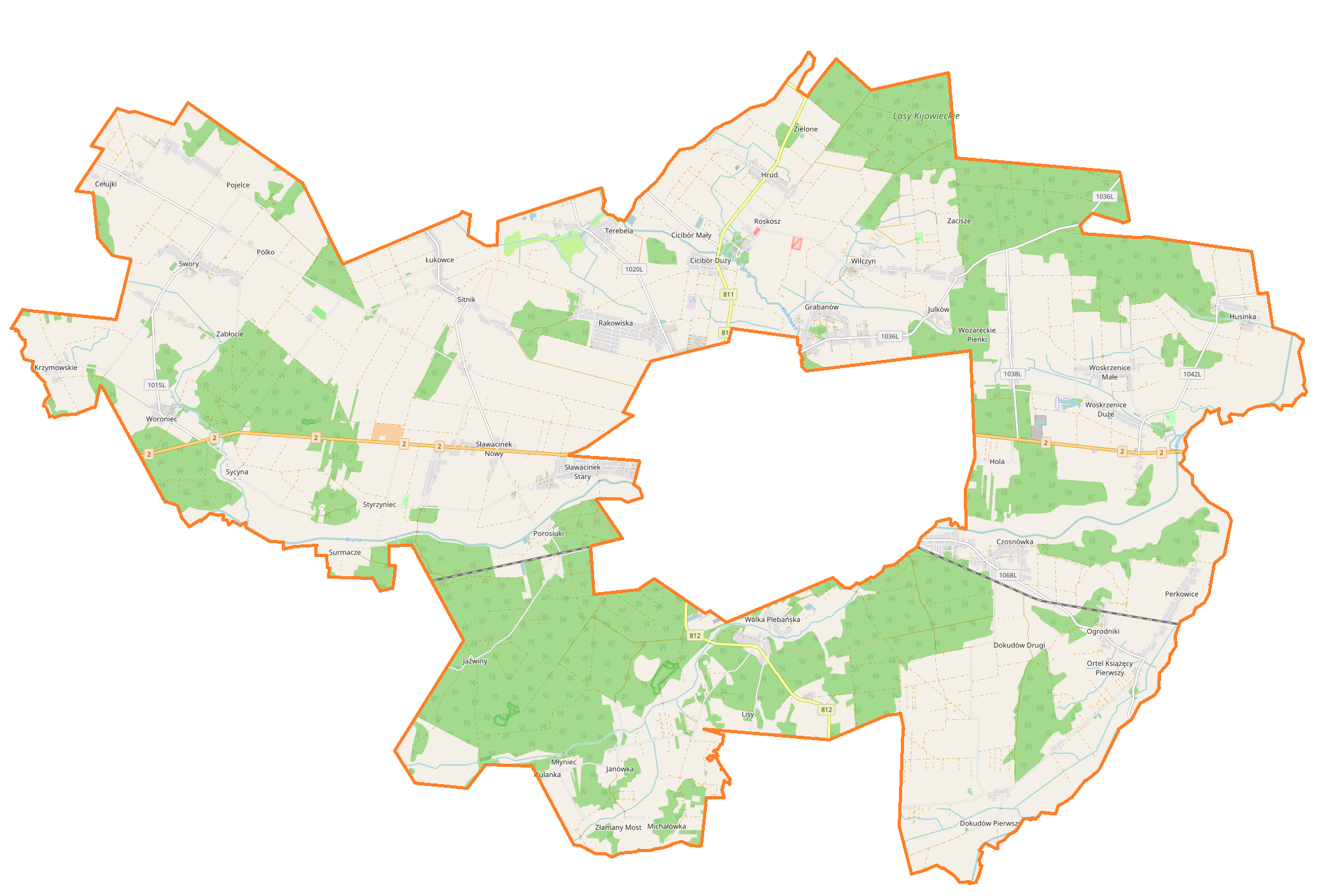

- Location within Poland
- Coordinates (Biała Podlaska): 52°2′N 23°7′E
- Country: Poland
- Voivodeship: Lublin
- County: Biała County
- Seat: Biała Podlaska

Area
  - Total: 324.76 km^{2} (125.39 sq mi)

Population (2014)
  - Total: 13,848
  - Density: 42.641/km^{2} (110.44/sq mi)
- Website: http://www.gmina.bialapodl.pl/

Gmina Biała Podlaska is a rural gmina (administrative district) in Biała County, Lublin Voivodeship, in eastern Poland. Its seat is the city of Biała Podlaska, although the city is not part of the territory of the gmina.

The gmina covers an area of 324.76 square kilometres (125.4 sq mi), and as of 2006 its total population is 12,299 (13,848 in 2014).

== Villages ==
Gmina Biała Podlaska contains the villages and settlements of:

- Cełujki
- Cicibór Duży
- Cicibór Mały
- Czosnówka
- Dokudów Drugi
- Dokudów Pierwszy
- Grabanów
- Grabanów-Kolonia
- Hola
- Hrud
- Husinka
- Janówka
- Jaźwiny
- Julków
- Kaliłów
- Kamieniczne
- Krzymowskie
- Lisy
- Łukowce
- Michałówka
- Młyniec
- Nowy Sławacinek
- Ogrodniki
- Ortel Książęcy Drugi
- Ortel Książęcy Pierwszy
- Perkowice
- Pojelce
- Pólko
- Porosiuki
- Rakowiska
- Roskosz
- Sitnik
- Sławacinek Stary
- Styrzyniec
- Surmacze
- Swory
- Sycyna
- Terebela
- Wilczyn
- Wólka Plebańska
- Woroniec
- Woskrzenice Duże
- Woskrzenice Małe
- Zabłocie
- Zacisze

== Neighbouring gminas ==
Gmina Biała Podlaska is bordered by the city of Biała Podlaska and by the gminas of Drelów, Huszlew, Janów Podlaski, Leśna Podlaska, Łomazy, Międzyrzec Podlaski, Piszczac, Rokitno and Zalesie.
