= Młyniec, Lublin Voivodeship =

Młyniec
- Village
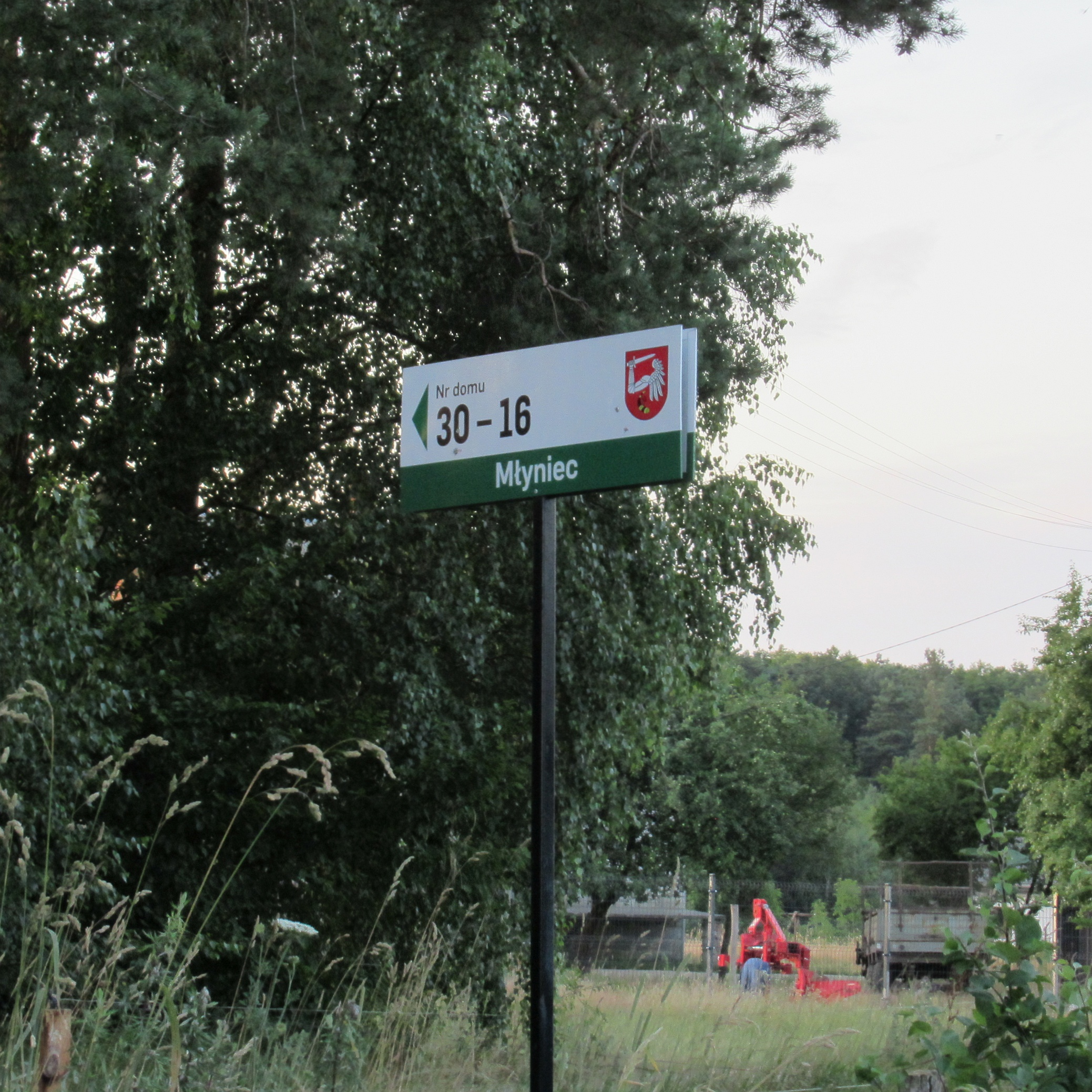
- Młyniec

- Location within Poland
- Coordinates: 51°57′56″N 23°03′46″E
- Country: Poland
- Voivodeship: Lublin
- County: Biała
- Gmina: Biała Podlaska

Młyniec [ˈmwɨɲɛt͡s] is a village in the administrative district of Gmina Biała Podlaska, within Biała County, Lublin Voivodeship, in eastern Poland.
