= Janówka, Gmina Biała Podlaska =

Janówka
- Village
- Location within Poland
- Coordinates: 51°57′51″N 23°04′56″E
- Country: Poland
- Voivodeship: Lublin
- County: Biała
- Gmina: Biała Podlaska

Janówka [jaˈnufka] is a village in the administrative district of Gmina Biała Podlaska, within Biała County, Lublin Voivodeship, in eastern Poland.
