= Polish 161st Fighter Escadrille =

161. Fighter Escadrille was a unit of the Polish Air Force at the start of the Second World War. The unit was attached to the Łódź Army.

Sign of 161 Fighter Escadrille.

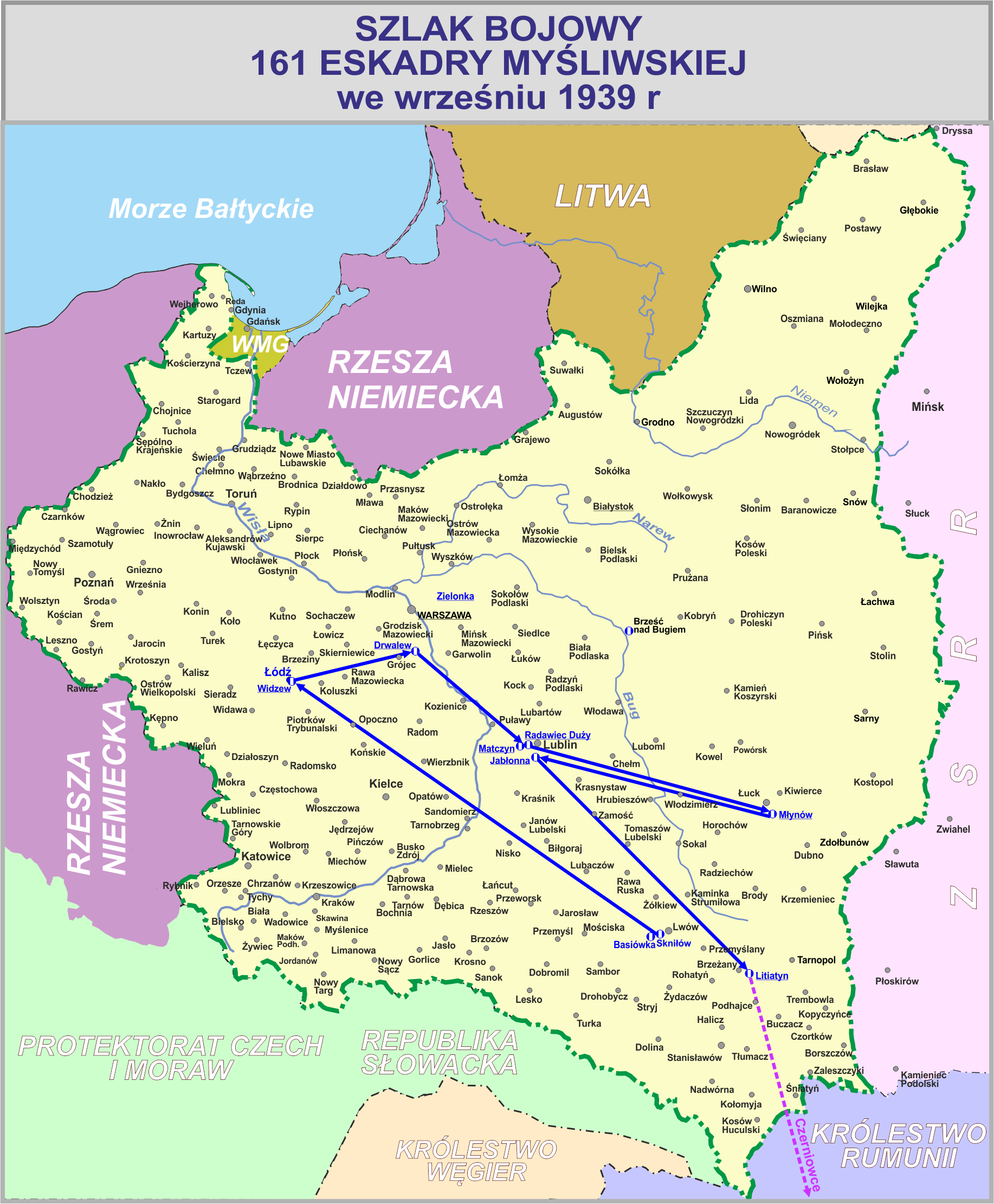

== Equipment ==
8 PZL P.11c and 2 PZL P.11a fighter airplanes.

== Air crew ==
commander of the unit: kpt. pil. Władysław Szczęśniewski
deputy commander: por.pil.Władysław Goettel

Pilots:

1. ppor.pil.Jan Dzwonek
2. ppror.pil.Antoni Chabroszewski
3. ppor.pil.Tadeusz Koc
4. ppor.pil.Kazimierz Rębalski
5. ppor.pil.Marian Trzebiński
6. pchor.pil.Wiesław Choms
7. pchor.pil.Edward Kramarski
8. pchor.pil.Andrzej Malarowski
9. pchor.pil.Piotr Ruszel
10. plut.pil.Marian Domagała
11. plut.pil.Franciszek Prętkiewicz
12. kpr.pil.Feliks Gmur
13. kpr.pil.Antoni Seredyn
14. st.szer.pil.Karol Sumara
15. st.szer.pil.Stanisław Węgliński

== See also ==
- Polish Air Force order of battle in 1939
