= Gmina Rossosz =

Gmina Rossosz Rossosz Commune
- Gmina
- Coat of arms
- Interactive map of Gmina Rossosz
- Coordinates (Rossosz): 51°51′N 23°8′E
- Country: Poland
- Voivodeship: Lublin
- County: Biała County
- Seat: Rossosz

Area
  - Total: 76.12 km^{2} (29.39 sq mi)

Population (2014)
  - Total: 2,331
  - Density: 30.62/km^{2} (79.31/sq mi)

Gmina Rossosz is a rural gmina (administrative district) in Biała County, Lublin Voivodeship, in eastern Poland. Its seat is the village of Rossosz, which lies approximately 21 kilometres (13 mi) south of Biała Podlaska and 78 km (48 mi) north-east of the regional capital Lublin.

The gmina covers an area of 76.12 square kilometres (29.4 sq mi), and as of 2006 its total population is 2,404 (2,331 in 2014).

== Villages ==
Gmina Rossosz contains the villages and settlements of Bordziłówka, Kożanówka, Mokre, Musiejówka, Romaszki and Rossosz.

== Neighbouring gminas ==
Gmina Rossosz is bordered by the gminas of Komarówka Podlaska, Łomazy and Wisznice.
