= Biała County, Lublin Voivodeship =

Biała County Powiat bialski
- County
- Coat of arms

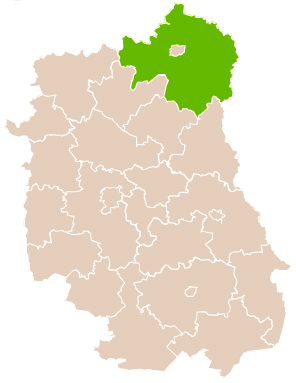
- Location within the voivodeship
- Coordinates (Biała Podlaska): 52°2′N 23°7′E
- Country: Poland
- Voivodeship: Lublin
- Seat: Biała Podlaska
- Gminas: Total 19 (incl. 2 urban): Międzyrzec Podlaski; Terespol; Gmina Biała Podlaska; Gmina Drelów; Gmina Janów Podlaski; Gmina Kodeń; Gmina Konstantynów; Gmina Leśna Podlaska; Gmina Łomazy; Gmina Międzyrzec Podlaski; Gmina Piszczac; Gmina Rokitno; Gmina Rossosz; Gmina Sławatycze; Gmina Sosnówka; Gmina Terespol; Gmina Tuczna; Gmina Wisznice; Gmina Zalesie

Area
  - Total: 2,753.67 km^{2} (1,063.20 sq mi)

Population (2019)
  - Total: 111,078
  - Density: 40.3382/km^{2} (104.475/sq mi)
  - Urban: 22,273
  - Rural: 88,805
- Car plates: LBI
- Website: www.powiatbialski.lubelskie.pl

Biała County (Polish: powiat bialski) is a county in Lublin Voivodeship, eastern Poland, on the border with Belarus. It was established on January 1, 1999, as a result of the Polish local government reforms passed in 1998. Its administrative seat is the city of Biała Podlaska, although the city is not part of the county (it constitutes a separate city county). The only towns in Biała County are Międzyrzec Podlaski, which lies 24 km (15 mi) west of Biała Podlaska, and the border town of Terespol, 32 km (20 mi) east of Biała Podlaska.

The county covers an area of 2,753.67 square kilometres (1,063.2 sq mi). As of 2019, its total population is 111,078, including 16,736 in Międzyrzec Podlaski, 5,537 in Terespol, and a rural population of 88,805.

== Neighbouring counties ==
Apart from the city of Biała Podlaska, Biała County is bordered by Włodawa County and Parczew County to the south, Radzyń County to the south-west, Łuków County and Siedlce County to the west, Łosice County to the north-west, and Siemiatycze County to the north. It also borders Belarus to the east.

== Administrative divisions ==
The county is subdivided into 19 municipalities (two urban and 17 rural). These are listed in the following table, in descending order of population.

Gmina	Type	Area (km^{2})	Population (2019)	Seat
Międzyrzec Podlaski	urban	20.0	16,736	
Gmina Biała Podlaska	rural	324.8	14,391	Biała Podlaska *
Gmina Międzyrzec Podlaski	rural	261.6	10,527	Międzyrzec Podlaski *
Gmina Piszczac	rural	169.9	7,213	Piszczac
Gmina Terespol	rural	141.3	6,721	Terespol *
Terespol	urban	10.1	5,537	
Gmina Drelów	rural	228.0	5,405	Drelów
Gmina Janów Podlaski	rural	135.0	5,314	Janów Podlaski
Gmina Łomazy	rural	200.4	4,944	Łomazy
Gmina Wisznice	rural	173.0	4,944	Wisznice
Gmina Zalesie	rural	147.2	4,426	Zalesie
Gmina Leśna Podlaska	rural	97.7	4,249	Leśna Podlaska
Gmina Konstantynów	rural	87.1	4,148	Konstantynów
Gmina Kodeń	rural	150.3	3,553	Kodeń
Gmina Tuczna	rural	170.4	3,022	Tuczna
Gmina Rokitno	rural	140.8	2,969	Rokitno
Gmina Sosnówka	rural	148.4	2,431	Sosnówka
Gmina Sławatycze	rural	71.7	2,328	Sławatycze
Gmina Rossosz	rural	76.1	2,220	Rossosz
* seat not part of the gmina
