= Church of the Intercession (Sławatycze) =

Eastern Orthodox parish church in Sławatycze, Poland

Coordinates: 51°45′47.2″N 23°33′17.6″E

- Cerkiew Opieki Matki Bożej
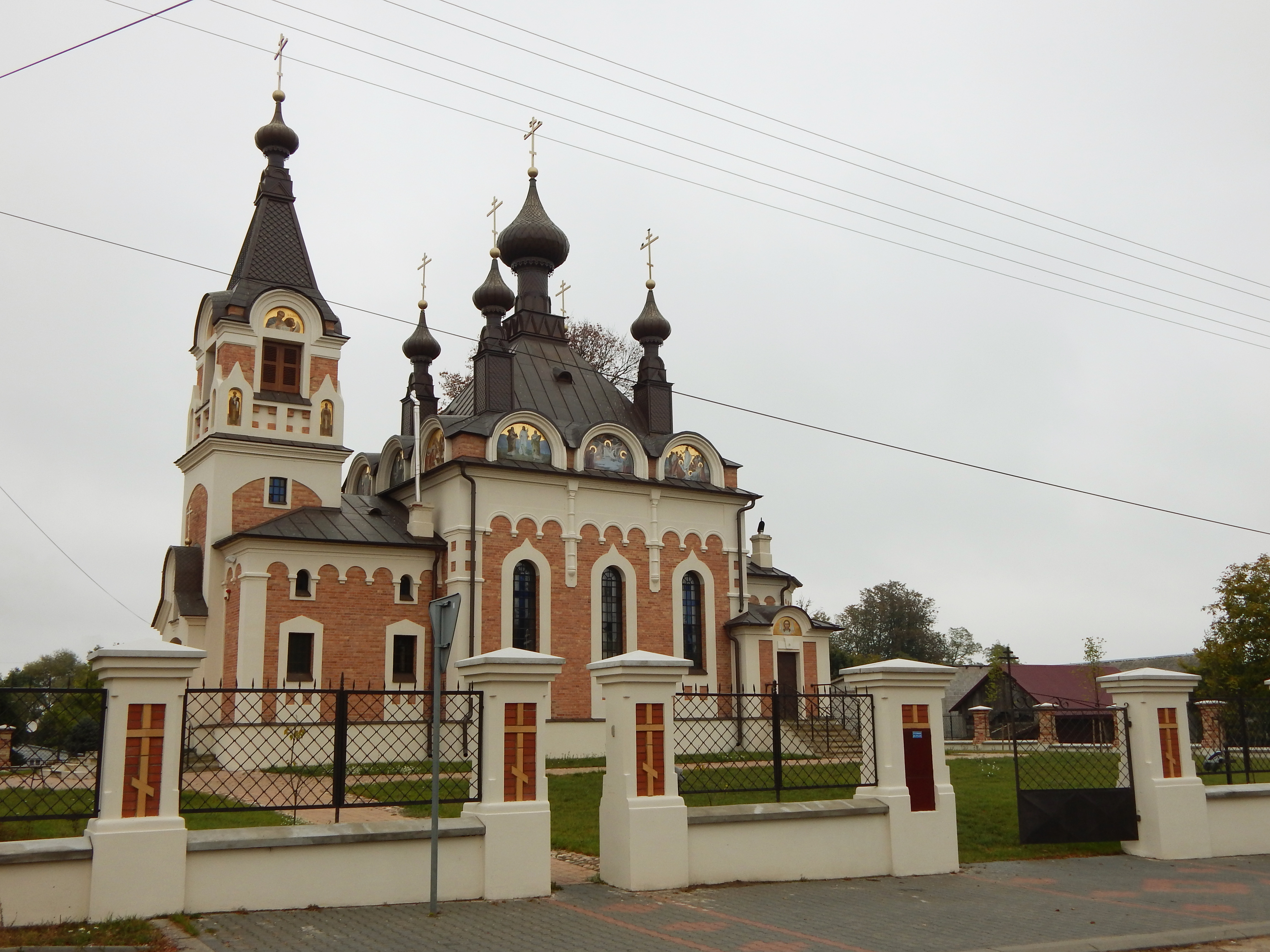
- Church of the Intercession
- Location: Sławatycze
- Country: Poland
- Denomination: Polish Orthodox Church

History
- Status: active Orthodox church
- Founder: Klavdiy Paskhalov
- Dedication: Intercession of the Theotokos
- Dedicated: September 1912

Architecture
- Architect: Alexandr Puring
- Style: Russian Revival
- Years built: 1910–1912
- Closed: 1947 (reopened in 1965)

Specifications
- Materials: brick

Administration
- Diocese: Diocese of Lublin and Chełm

The Church of the Intercession is a Polish Orthodox Church parish church in Sławatycze. It belongs to the Terespol Deanery of the Diocese of Lublin and Chełm of the Polish Orthodox Church.

The first Orthodox church in Sławatycze was established in the late 15th or early 16th century. After 1596, the parish administering it adopted the Union of Brest. The currently operating church was built between 1910 and 1912, replacing an 18th-century Ruthenian Uniate Church structure. The building was funded by the Slavophile publicist and landowner Klavdiy Paskhalov. The church was completed in September 1912 and has since been the main parish church in Sławatycze. From 1915 to 1918, the church functioned as a field hospital. In the Second Polish Republic, it again became an active Eastern Orthodox church. In 1938, it was listed among the churches slated for destruction as part of a Polonization and reversion campaign, but its demolition was prevented by the local Catholic parson. In 1947, when the Eastern Orthodox population of Sławatycze was deported during Operation Vistula, the church was abandoned and deteriorated over the next three years. Irregular services resumed from Pascha 1952. It was returned to regular liturgical use in 1965 through the efforts of Archimandrite Eulogiusz, the superior of the St. Onuphrius Monastery in Jabłeczna.

The church is located in the center of the town on Kodeńska Street (on the south side of the market square). It was entered into the heritage registers in December 1988 (again on 20 September 2011) under the number A/1410.

== History ==
=== First churches in Sławatycze ===
The first Eastern Orthodox parish in Sławatycze was established in the 15th century. The church serving this parish was funded by Ursul Voloshin, a courtier of Alexander Jagiellon, at the beginning of the 16th century or, according to another source, in 1499. In its early centuries, the church was dedicated to the Nativity of the Mother of God and the Ascension of the Lord.

The Sławatycze parish remained Eastern Orthodox until the Union of Brest. After the union, it adopted Byzantine-Rite Catholicism along with the entire Chełm Eparchy.

From its initial construction to 1721, several churches operated consecutively in Sławatycze; each was built on the site of the previous one when it became dilapidated or was destroyed by fire. In 1721, Anna Radziwiłł funded the construction of a wooden church with two domes using materials from the older structure. She also ordered the church to be moved to the end of the village and built a Catholic church on the original site. According to Grzegorz Pelica, the actual founder was Grand Chancellor of Lithuania, Karol Stanisław Radziwiłł, who endowed the parish in 1698 and in 1721 provided funds for a new two-story church. The church had a dual dedication and two altars: the main altar of the Nativity of the Mother of God and the Intercession. A 1726 episcopal visitation report describes two "great ancient" icons of the Intercession and Christ the Savior in the church. The church also contained a sacrificial table (Note: A smaller table, traditionally located in the sanctuary against the northern wall, where the Holy Gifts are placed. This is also where they are prepared for the Divine Liturgy. Additionally, outside of services, the liturgical vessels are placed on the sacrificial table.) with a depiction of Golgotha, while the dome featured images of the Crucified Christ and the Holy Trinity against a blue background with golden stars.

The church's interior was gradually modified to align with the Latinization of the Uniate rite. The two altars were used until 1796. Subsequently, an organ was installed at the location of the Intercession altar, where the choir also sang. Stations of the Cross were introduced into the church. A 1797 episcopal visitation report indicated that the Sławatycze parish had 1,107 members. The church's patron was Grand Chamberlain of Lithuania Hieronim Wincenty Radziwiłł.

=== Construction ===
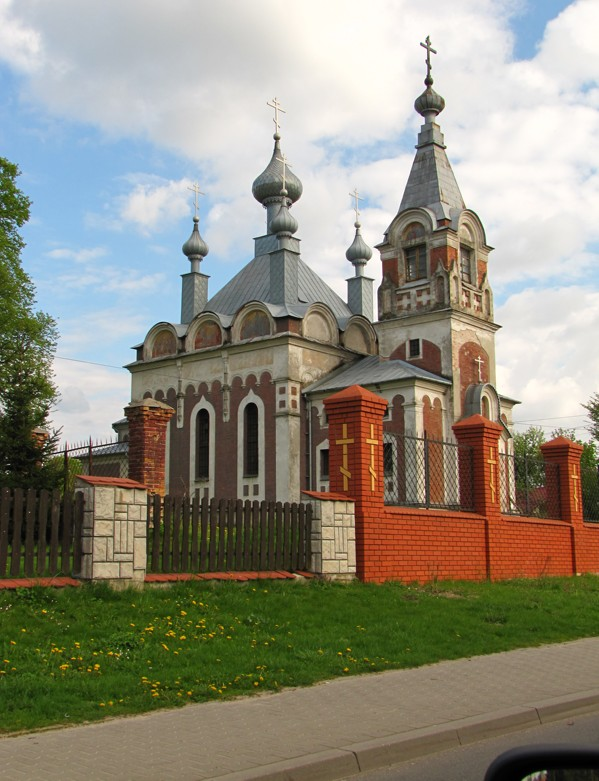
Church from the north

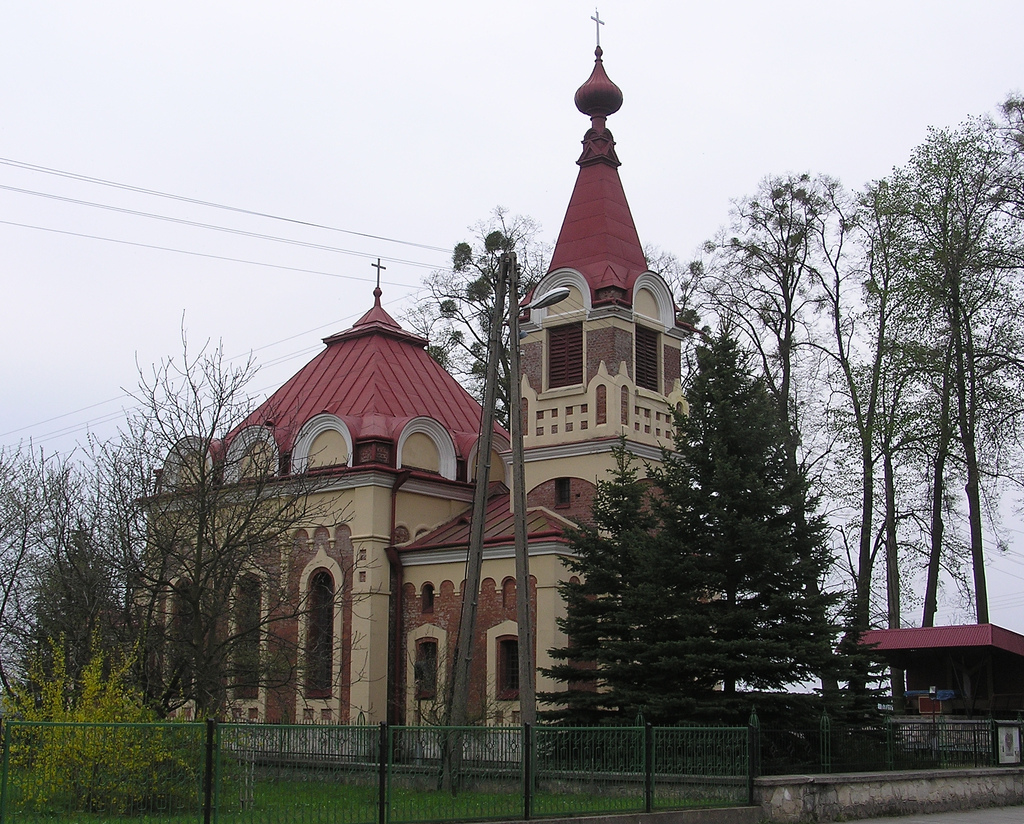
Church in Topólcza, now (2013) the Catholic Church of St. Isidore – one of four churches built according to the same design as the church in Sławatycze. Differences in the appearance of both buildings are due to changes made to the church in Topólcza after the change in denomination

The church in Sławatycze remained the seat of the Uniate parish until 1875, when it was incorporated into the Diocese of Chełm and Warsaw of the Russian Orthodox Church along with the entire Chełm Diocese. After the change in denomination, elements foreign to the Orthodox tradition (such as the pipe organ and Stations of the Cross) were removed from the interior. A new iconostasis and altar with a new antimins were installed in the building. The church was rededicated in 1886.

By the early 20th century, the 18th-century church was in such poor condition that the parson, Father Vladimir Antonovich, deemed it unsuitable for renovation. The rectory was in similarly poor condition. Another proponent of building a brick church in the village was the abbot of St. Onuphrius Monastery in Jabłeczna, Archimandrite Seraphim. In 1907, a new parish house was built in Sławatycze. Construction of the new church began three years later, as several new church projects were already underway in the diocese and the church authorities were reluctant to start another.

Funds for the church's construction were donated by Artiemy Sychov from the Chernihiv Governorate, but his contribution proved insufficient. Ultimately, the main benefactors of the building were the Tula landowners Klavdiy and Jelizavieta Paskhalov. Klavdiy Paskhalov, a Slavophile, publicist, and activist of the Black Hundreds organization, joined the parson of Sławatycze and Archimandrite Seraphim in the committee overseeing the construction work. The church was consecrated and opened on 12 September 1912. It was not yet completed at that time – the polychromes in its interior were finished in 1914. The 18th-century wooden church continued to exist but was demolished between 1915 and 1920.

=== Church operations ===
The brick church in Sławatycze operated for only three years, as in 1915 the local Eastern Orthodox population fled into Russia along with the retreating Russian troops. The parson, Father Antonovich, along with his wife and unmarried daughter, evacuated to Moscow. The abandoned church was converted into a field hospital.

In 1919, the church in Sławatycze was not included on the list of Orthodox churches that the Polish Ministry of Religious Affairs and Public Education intended to make available to the faithful. Despite this, in 1921, the authorities of the Orthodox Church in Poland managed to legally reactivate the parish in Sławatycze and reopen the church. It was one of eight churches in Włodawa County. According to another source, the church in Sławatycze functioned as a branch of the parish of St. Michael the Archangel in Holeszów.

In 1938, during the Polonization and reclamation campaign, the church was slated for demolition. However, it was saved by the intervention of the local Roman Catholic parson.

The church remained operational during World War II. The parish ceased to function only after the Ukrainian Orthodox population was deported during Operation Vistula. The church building was abandoned and gradually vandalized by the local population. For a time, the dilapidated building housed a public toilet. Restoration of the building began in 1950. According to local recollections, that year a mysterious light, visible for 10 km, appeared over the ruined church, prompting the Roman Catholic parson in Sławatycze to initiate efforts to clean up the site. After the cleanup, the entrance was boarded up.

There are varying dates for the church's reopening. According to Grzegorz Pelica, Father Mikołaj Dejneka celebrated the Holy Liturgy for Pascha in 1952, and subsequent services were held irregularly. Officially, the church was active from 1957. In documents from the Department of Religious Affairs of the municipal council in Lublin from 1956, the Sławatycze church was already listed as a parish seat. In reality, that year the Polish Orthodox Church gained the right to use the building but could not register it as a permanent filial or parish site. Permission to use the church – similar to several others in the region – was related to earlier discussions between the authorities and the Orthodox hierarchy about conducting missionary work among Greek Catholics, which was especially supported by Metropolitan Macarius of Warsaw and all Poland.

The parish was officially established only in 1966, following a request from Metropolitan Stefan of Warsaw and all Poland. The local authorities agreed to reopen the dilapidated building to the Orthodox faithful thanks to the efforts of Archimandrite Eulogiusz, the abbot of St. Onuphrius Monastery in Jabłeczna. A minor renovation was also conducted in 1966. Monks from Jabłeczna monastery officiated services at the church; only in 1998 or 1999 did clergy from the Diocese of Lublin and Chełm take over these duties. In the late 1960s, the parish's number of faithful was estimated at 800, though a survey showed a much lower number of 300. In 1969, official data reported 400 Orthodox individuals living in Sławatycze and Jabłeczna. Religious teaching was provided at the church. By the early 21st century, the pastoral station served several dozen families.

Further renovations occurred in 1997, thanks to Archbishop Abel of Lublin and Chełm and the local parish community. After 2002, new bells were installed in the church, one originally from the Transfiguration Cathedral in Lublin and two others from the former church in Kodeń.

In 2012, during the centenary celebrations of the church's establishment, Metropolitan Sawa of Warsaw and all Poland, Archbishop Abel of Lublin and Chełm, and Bishop Paisjusz of Gorlice consecrated a cross near the church to commemorate the building's benefactors, particularly the Paskhalov family, as well as deceased parishioners.

From 2014 to 2016, the church underwent extensive restoration thanks to foreign funding obtained through the project East Slavic Cultural Heritage – Conservation, Restoration, Digitization of Historic Churches. The church's renovation received the Conservator's Laurel Award in 2018.

== Architecture ==
=== Building ===
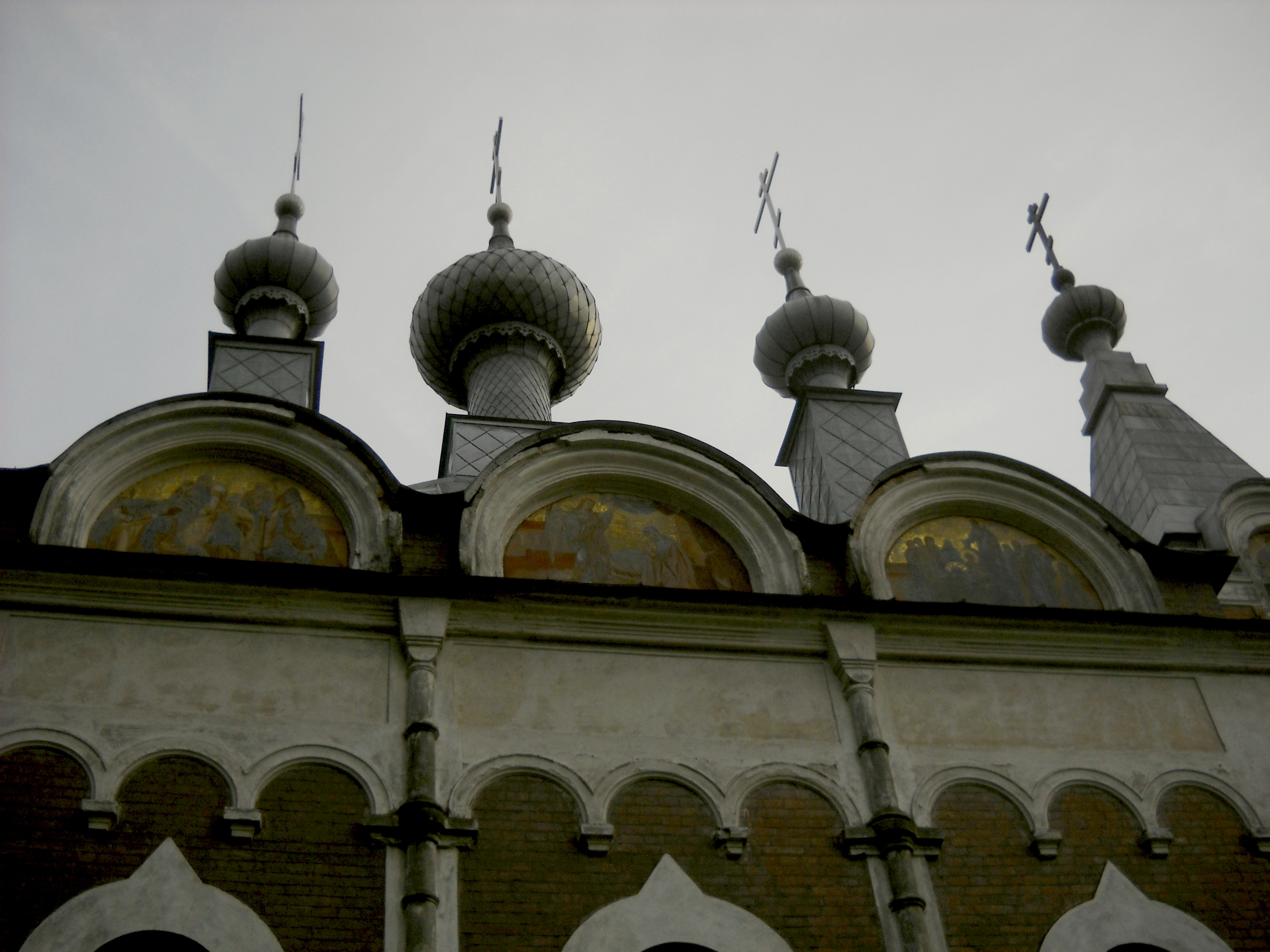
Damaged icons on metal in niches on one of the side walls of the church, condition before conservation between 2014 and 2016

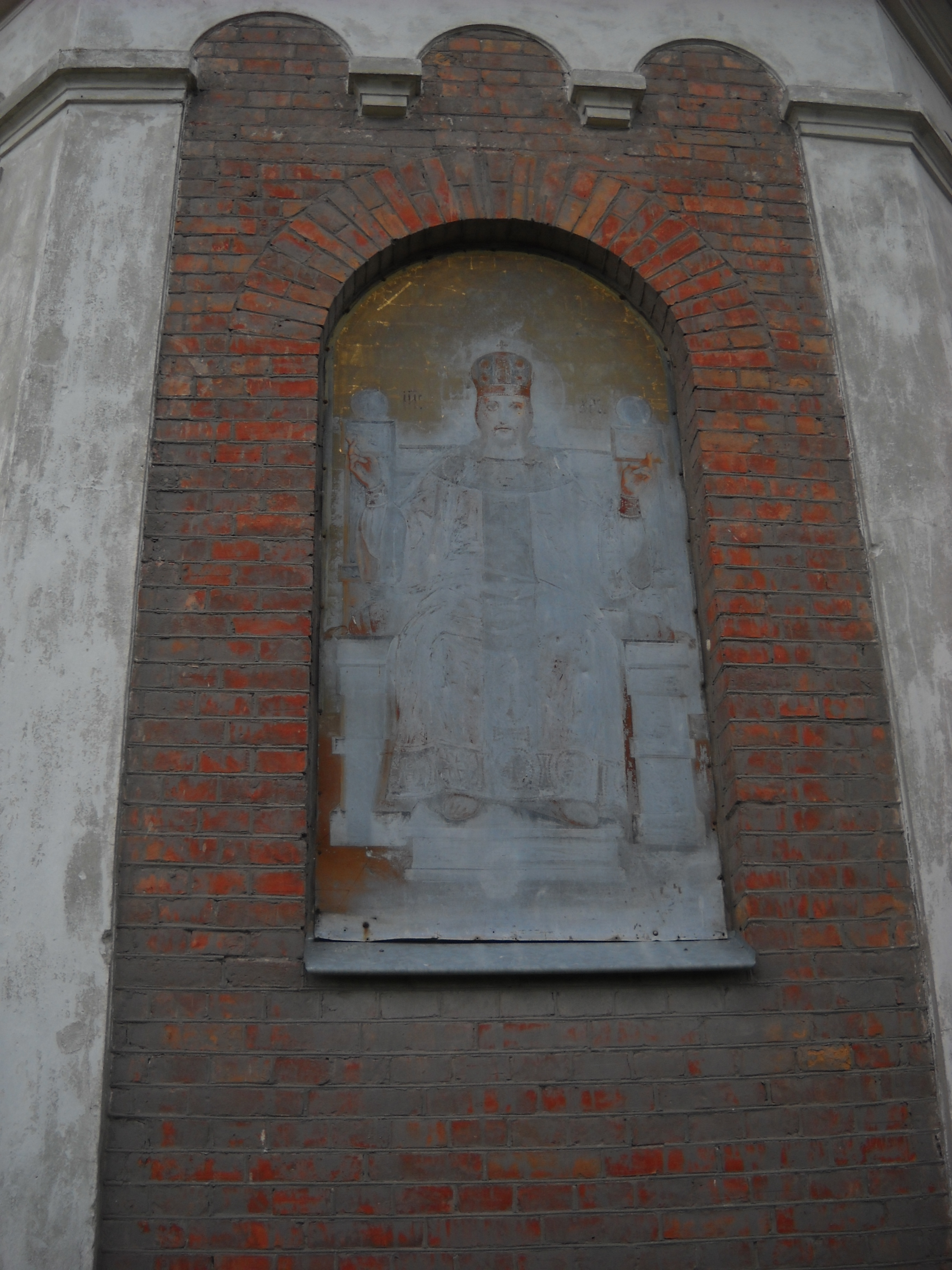
Fresco of Christ the Savior on the wall of the chancel, condition before conservation between 2014 and 2016

The church represents the Russian Revival style. Its design was created by the diocesan architect Alexandr Puring. The plan he developed was used for the construction of five different churches in the Chełm diocese. In addition to the church in Sławatycze, these included buildings in Kryłów, Oszczów, Krupe, and Topólcza. (Note: Only the church in Sławatycze still serves its original function (as of 2012). The churches in Krupe and Topólcza were adapted into Roman Catholic churches in the interwar period. The church in Kryłów was destroyed in 1938 and finally demolished after World War II, while the church in Oszczów fell into ruin around the same time, following the deportation of Orthodox Ukrainians from the village.) According to another source, a similar design was also used for one of the churches in the monastery complex in Wirów and in Husynne. (Note: The church in Husynne was demolished in 1938, while the structure in Wirów was adapted into a Roman Catholic church.) Constructing groups of identical churches based on a single design was not uncommon in contemporary Russian sacred architecture.

The building was constructed from brick. It is a tripartite structure with a rectangular church porch, a single square nave covered with a tent roof, and a polygonal apse. Above the church porch rises a bell tower topped with a spire, which in turn is crowned by a small onion-shaped dome. Over the nave, there are five more domes, with the largest one centrally completing the roof, while the others are situated at its corners. The exterior of the building is adorned with plastered window bands, pilasters, cornices, and a frieze. A distinctive feature of the church in Sławatycze (and its twin churches) compared to the church architecture of Poland is the use of red brick for construction, combined with decorative details made of white stone. The architect was inspired by Moscow churches, but the artistic and decorative solutions known from them were not directly replicated but rather significantly simplified. Nonetheless, the designer believed that applying decorative details with motifs of kokoshniks and tile friezes to the solid (despite traditional tripartite) form of the building, along with the erection of five onion-shaped domes, would convey the main features of the sacred building style he emulated.

Below the roof is a row of niches in which icons depicting scenes from the life of Christ, painted on metal and gilded, were placed.

=== Interior ===
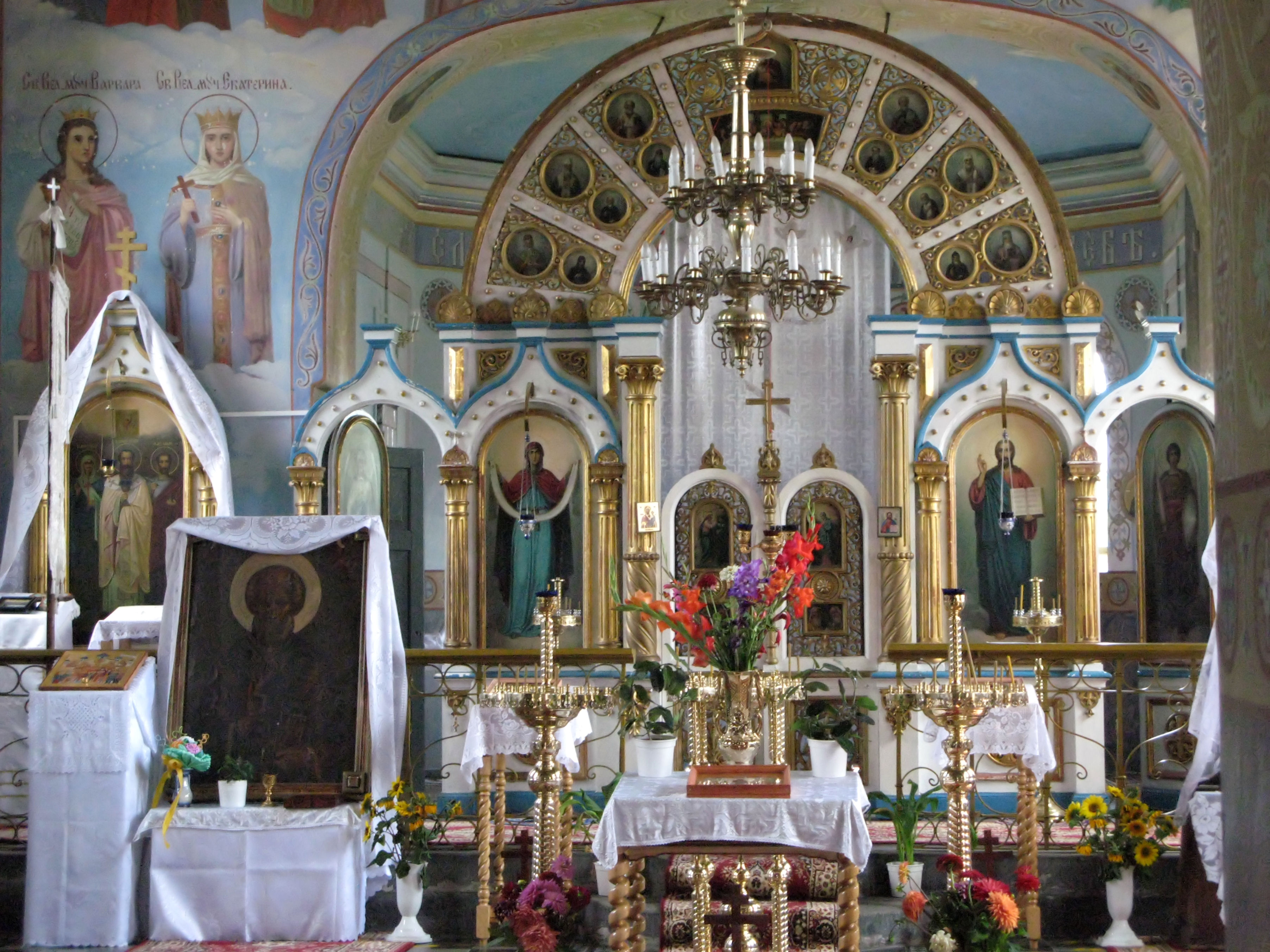
Interior of the church

Inside the church, there is a single-row iconostasis with an arch above the royal doors, displaying more round icons. Above the iconostasis, saints associated with Byzantium and Kievan Rus' are depicted in two groups. Such iconostases were present in all the churches built according to Puring's identical design funded by the Paskhalov family. The church houses icons of Christ Pantocrator and St. Nicholas from the late 18th and early 19th centuries. Additionally, the church's furnishings include an icon of the patrons of the founding family – Saints Claudius, Elizabeth, and Basil.

Other historic icons from the Sławatycze church were removed after 1945. The church also contains two processional banners preserved from the Uniate period, created in the 18th century. The first depicts the figure of the Mother of God modeled on the Theotokos of Pochayiv and St. Onuphrius, framed with the motif of the Eye of Providence and putti. The second shows the Mother of God with Child and St. Joseph with Child.

== Bibliography ==
- Wysocki, J. (2011). Ukraińcy na Lubelszczyźnie w latach 1944–1956 (in Polish). Lublin: Instytut Pamięci Narodowej. ISBN 978-83-7629-260-1.
- Cynalewska-Kuczma, P. (2004). Architektura cerkiewna Królestwa Polskiego narzędziem integracji z Imperium Rosyjskim (in Polish). Poznań: Wydawnictwo Naukowe Uniwersytetu Adama Mickiewicza. ISBN 83-232-1463-8.
