= Serafin Ostroumov =

Russian Orthodox bishop and saint New Martyr

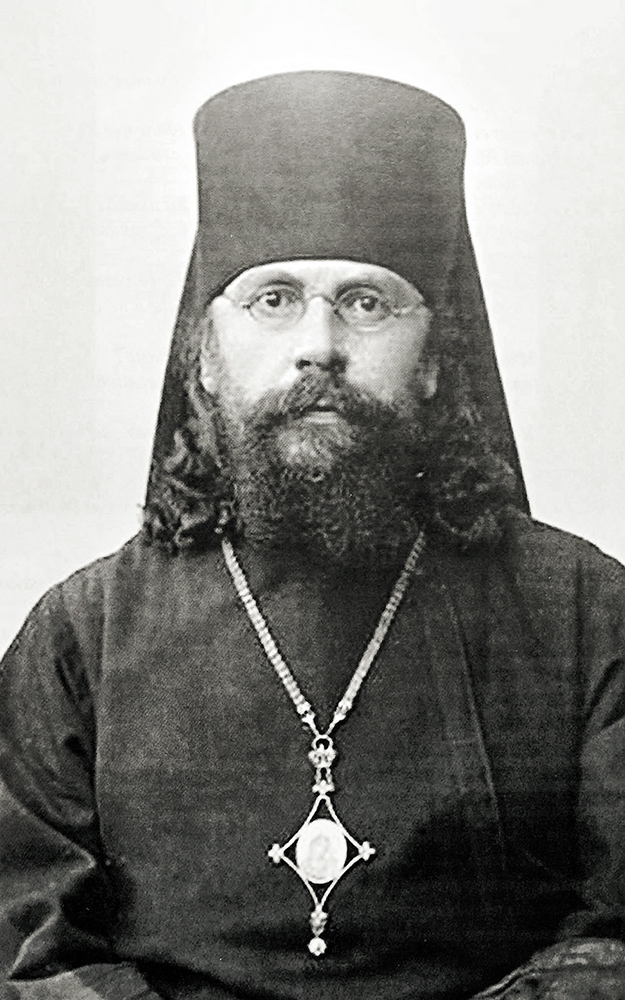
- In office 1927–1936
- Title: Archbishop of Smolensk and Dorogobuzh

Personal life
- Born: Mikhail Ostroumov; 6 November 1880 Moscow
- Died: 8 December 1937 (aged 57) Katyn forest

Religious life
- Religion: Orthodox
- Church: Russian Orthodox Church

Serafin, secular name Mikhail Ostroumov (born 6 November 1880 in Moscow, died 8 December 1937 in Katyn forest) was a Russian Orthodox bishop and saint New Martyr.

The son of a church psalmist, he graduated from the Moscow Theological Seminary and later the Moscow Theological Academy. From 1906 to 1914, he served as the superior of the St. Onuphrius Monastery in Jabłeczna, contributing to its development as a religious and educational center. In 1914, he briefly led the Orthodox Theological Seminary in Chełm before evacuating to Moscow in 1915.

On 3 April 1916, he was consecrated as Bishop of Biała Podlaska, vicar of the Eparchy of Chełm. In 1917, he became the ordinary of the Eparchy of Oryol. From 1922 to 1924, he was imprisoned for opposing the confiscation of Russian Orthodox Church property. From 1927 to 1936, he served as the ordinary of the Diocese of Smolensk, where he unsuccessfully resisted the anti-religious policies of the Soviet authorities. Arrested in 1936 and accused of leading a counter-revolutionary group, he was initially sentenced to imprisonment. In 1937, after a renewed investigation, he was sentenced to death and executed, likely in the Katyn forest.

In 2001, the Russian Orthodox Church canonized him as a saint New Martyr.

== Biography ==
=== Early life ===
Serafin was born into the family of church psalmist Mitrofan Ostroumov, who served in a parish church in Moscow. He completed lower theological education at the Monastery of the Holy Mandylion, followed by the Moscow Theological Seminary in 1900 and the Moscow Theological Academy in 1904. On 14 September 1904, he took monastic vows before Bishop Tryphon Turkestanov at the Epiphany Monastery in Moscow.

In September 1904, he was successively ordained as a hierodeacon and then a hieromonk. Immediately after his ordination, he went to the Optina Monastery, where he worked in the monastery kitchen and served as a canonarch. He later returned to Moscow, where he was employed as an acting lecturer in the Department of Theory and History of Homiletics at the Moscow Theological Academy.

=== At the St. Onuphrius Monastery in Jabłeczna ===
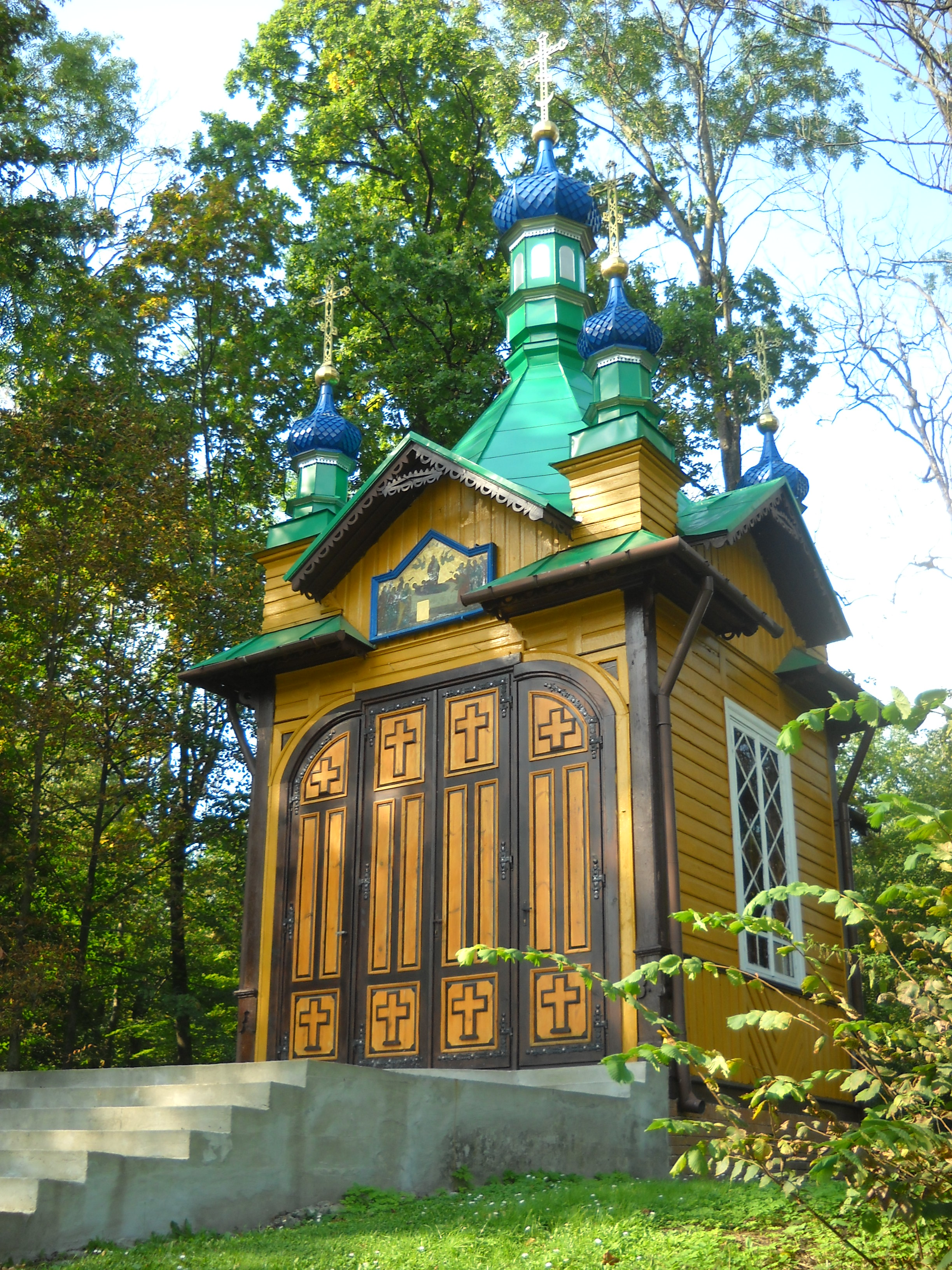
Chapel of the Dormition of the Mother of God in Jabłeczna, constructed under the supervision of Archimandrite Serafin

In 1905, Hieromonk Serafin traveled with theology professor Mikhail Tariyev to monasteries in Wirów and Leśna Podlaska, as well as to the Chełm Land. Inspired by this experience, he decided to abandon his academic career and pursue pastoral work in the region. In 1906, at his request, he joined the St. Onuphrius Monastery in Jabłeczna. From September of that year, he served as deputy superior of the monastery. Together with the superior, Archimandrite Joseph Petrovykh, Serafin worked to improve the monastery's financial situation and expand its charitable and educational activities. These efforts aligned with the objectives set by the Most Holy Synod after the Eparchy of Chełm was separated from the Eparchy of Warsaw in 1905. The monastery was intended to become a significant center for Russification and the promotion of Orthodoxy, countering the trend of former Chełm Uniates converting to Latin-rite Catholicism after Tsar Nicholas II's Edict of Toleration, with up to 200,000 individuals making the switch.

In October 1907, Hieromonk Serafin became the director of a two-grade parish school at the monastery and newly established teacher training courses, preparing educators for one-year church-affiliated schools. At the courses' inauguration, he emphasized the need for local teachers familiar with the region's culture, as outsiders often misunderstood its specifics. He successfully secured donors for the monastery's renovations and expansions, with significant financial support from Father Nikolai Kopiev of Moscow. This funding enabled the reconstruction and major renovation of the monastery's main church, the Cathedral of St. Onuphrius, with Hieromonk Serafin overseeing the renovation committee.

In November 1907, Archimandrite Joseph, the monastery's superior, was transferred to the Eparchy of Novgorod by the Most Holy Synod. On 1 December, Hieromonk Serafin became acting superior, and two weeks later, he was elected permanent superior by the monastic community – the first such election in decades, as the Most Holy Synod typically appointed superiors. The synod approved the election on 18 January 1908, and on 2 February, Serafin was elevated to the rank of archimandrite.

As superior, Archimandrite Serafin oversaw the construction of the Chapel of the Dormition of the Mother of God near the monastery (consecrated in August 1907) and finalized the establishment of a skete dedicated to Saints Sergius and Herman near Lake Białe (opened in 1909), both funded by Father Nikolai Kopiev. He also supervised the construction of the Chapel of the Meeting of the Lord on the banks of the Bug, built with donations from the faithful and consecrated in 1912. That same year, a second monastic branch was established in Dratów. Serafin sought funding from the Most Holy Synod for a new monastery bell tower, securing funds in 1913, but the project was halted by the outbreak of World War I. He also contributed to the construction of the Church of the Intercession in Sławatycze near Jabłeczna between 1910 and 1912.

During his tenure, the monks opened a two-grade school in Otoki village, educating 62 children, and a one-grade school in Jabłeczna for 60 students. A separate trade school offered practical courses in agriculture, horticulture, veterinary science, forestry, dairy production, and beekeeping. The monastery regained its status as a major pilgrimage center. Monks were invited to preach in various parishes of the Eparchy of Chełm or worked to promote Orthodoxy in Austrian Galicia. Serafin also documented the monastery's history, working on a research paper before World War I, though the manuscript was likely lost during the war.

=== Rector of the Orthodox Theological Seminary in Chełm ===
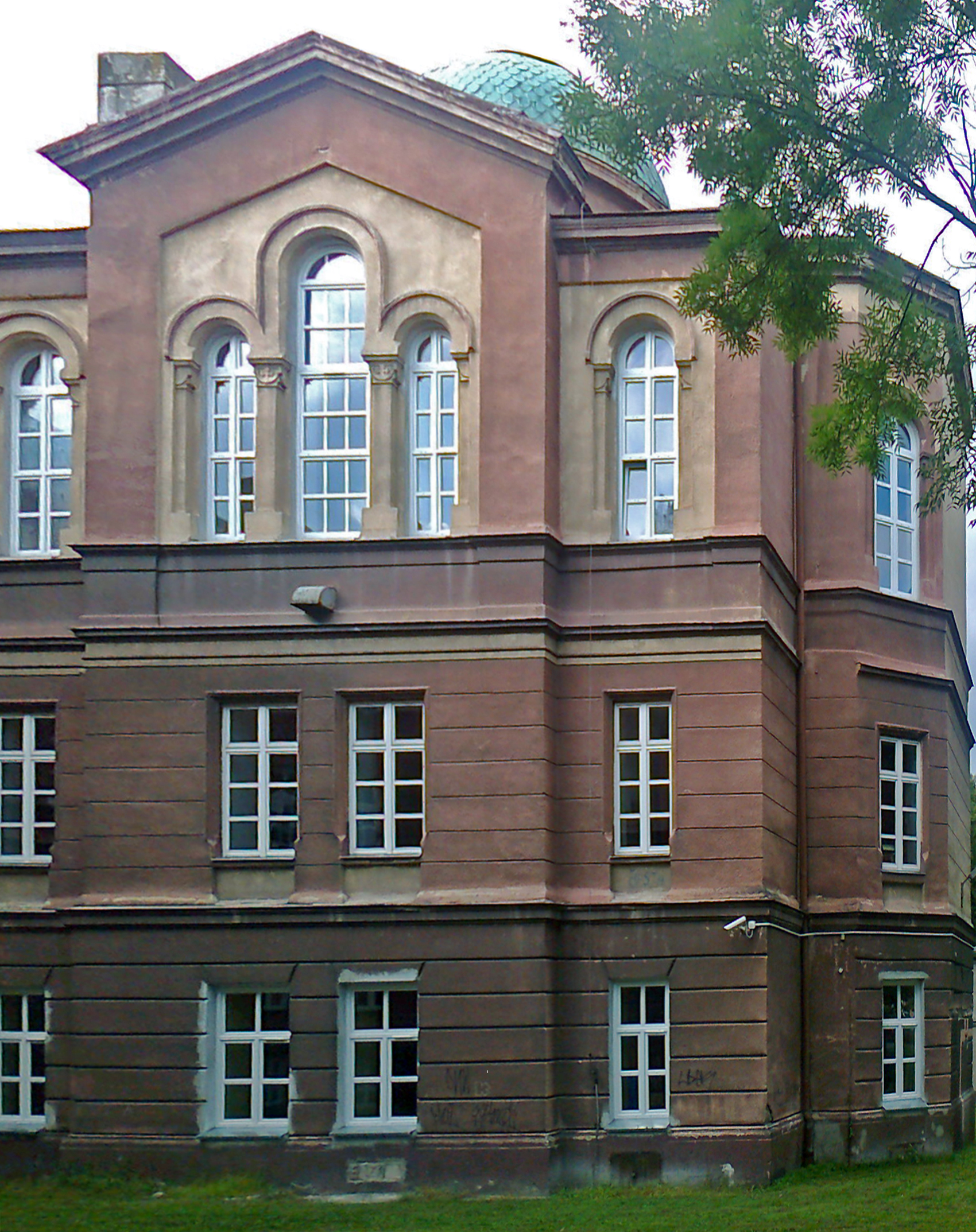
Building of the Orthodox Theological Seminary in Chełm. Serafin Ostroumov was its last rector before its closure in 1915

On 28 January 1914, the Most Holy Synod appointed Archimandrite Serafin as rector of the Orthodox Theological Seminary in Chełm. He also joined the eparchy's academic council and the Brotherhood of the Most Holy Theotokos. He contributed to editing eparchial publications, including the main journal, Chołmskaja Jeparchialnaja Żizn, and the newspaper Narodnyj Listok.

In 1915, Serafin evacuated with the seminary's staff and other Orthodox clergy from Chełm. He relocated to Moscow, where he supported refugees from the Chełm Land and worked to improve their conditions in exile. He formally remained rector until 1916.

=== Bishop ===
==== Bishop of Oryol ====
On 3 April 1916, Serafin was consecrated as Bishop of Biała Podlaska, vicar of the Eparchy of Chełm. The consecration was performed by Metropolitan Macarius Nevsky of Moscow and Kolomna, with Archbishop Mikhail Yermakov of Grodno and Brest, Bishop Vladimir Tikhonicky of Białystok, and Bishop Joasaph Kallistos of Novogeorgievsk as co-consecrators. On 21 April 1916, he was appointed locum tenens of the Eparchy of Chełm. In May 1917, the Russian Provisional Government assigned him as locum tenens of the Eparchy of Oryol, and on 18 August 1917, he became its ordinary, relieving him of his previous roles. In Oryol, he focused on the eparchial seminary, schools, publications, and monasteries, becoming an honorary member of the Oryol Church-Historical Society. When Soviet authorities banned church schools, he organized clandestine religious classes, delivered sermons, and led processions. He participated in the Local Council of the Russian Orthodox Church from 1917 to 1918.

During his pastoral work in Oryol, Serafin faced direct repression. On 14 March 1918, he was placed under house arrest without correspondence rights and interrogated twice. On 6 July 1918, the Cheka disrupted an eparchial meeting at his residence and searched the premises. In 1922, he was arrested for opposing the confiscation of church valuables, and in June, he was sentenced to seven years in solitary confinement based on fabricated charges. The sentence was reduced to one and a half years, and he was released after one year and ten months, returning to Oryol. Some sources suggest he resumed active pastoral work only in 1926.

On 29 May 1924, he was elevated to the rank of archbishop. After returning to Oryol, he actively opposed the Living Church. In December 1926, he was arrested again and forced to leave the city.

==== Bishop of Smolensk, arrest, and death ====
On 1 November 1927, Serafin assumed the Smolensk cathedra. Residing in Smolensk, he could not serve at the Dormition Cathedral, which had been transferred to the Living Church. The St. Nicholas Church in Smolensk temporarily served as the cathedral, but in 1929, it was closed along with over a dozen other Orthodox parishes. The Church of Saints Peter and Paul then assumed cathedral functions until 1936, when it was confiscated and repurposed as an archive. Serafin attempted to resist the Soviet anti-religious policies but lacked effective means. In 1931, liturgical vestments were confiscated from Smolensk parishes, and in 1935, church bells were seized.

On 11 November 1936, Serafin was arrested and charged with anti-Soviet agitation, accused of leading a counter-revolutionary group of Orthodox priests and predicting the fall of communism in his sermons. He was also accused of encouraging clergy to reopen closed churches. Eight other priests were tried alongside him. All defendants pleaded not guilty. They were sentenced to five years in a labor camp in Karaganda.

In November 1937, six months after arriving at the camp, Serafin's case was reopened, citing new evidence. In a second trial, an NKVD troika sentenced him to death by firing squad. His execution likely took place in the Katyn forest on 8 December 1937.

== Canonization and commemoration ==
Serafin
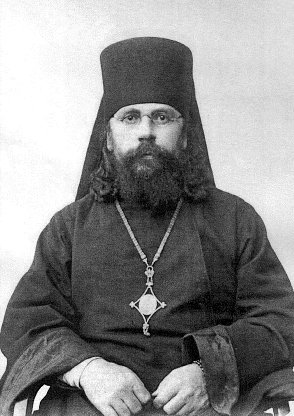

Saint New Martyr
- Canonized: 17 July 2001 by Russian Orthodox Church
- Feast: 25 November and the first Sunday after 25 January

On 21 November 1958, the Presidium of the Smolensk Regional Court posthumously rehabilitated Serafin Ostroumov. This was confirmed by the Smolensk Prosecutor's Office on 21 July 1989.

On 17 July 2001, the Russian Orthodox Church canonized him as part of the Sobor of New Martyrs and Confessors of Russia, designating his death anniversary as his feast day, alongside the general commemoration of the sobor.

An exhibition dedicated to him is located in the crypt of the Church of the Resurrection in Katyn, consecrated in 2012. His veneration emerged in the early 21st century in the Diocese of Lublin and Chełm of the Polish Orthodox Church, in areas where he served a century earlier. In 2014, Archbishop Abel Popławski of Lublin and Chełm established a parish in his name in Biała Podlaska.

== Bibliography ==
- Charkiewicz, J. (2008). Męczennicy XX wieku. Martyrologia Prawosławia w Polsce w biografiach świętych [Martyrs of the 20th Century. Martyrology of Orthodoxy in Poland in the Biographies of Saints] (in Polish). Warsaw: Warszawska Metropolia Prawosławna. ISBN 978-83-60311-11-0.
- Żeleźniakowicz, S. (2006). Istoriya Yablochinskogo Svyato-Onufriyevskogo monastyrya История Яблочинского Свято-Онуфриевского монастыря [History of the Jabłeczna St. Onuphrius Monastery] (in Russian). Warsaw: Warszawska Metropolia Prawosławna. ISBN 978-83-60311-03-5.
