= Abel Popławski =

Polish Eastern Orthodox cleric

Abel (Popławski)
- Archbishop of Lublin and Chełm
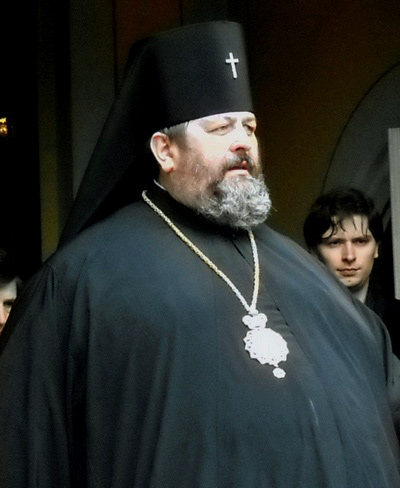
- Church: Polish Orthodox Church
- Elected: 1989
- Predecessor: Adam (Dubec)

Orders
- Ordination: 1979
- Consecration: 1989

Personal details
- Born: April 8, 1958 Narew

Archbishop Abel, (secular birth name Andrzej Popławski; born 8 April 1958, in Narew) is the Archbishop of Lublin and Chełm.

== Biography ==
=== Youth ===
He was born in Narew to an Orthodox family. According to his own memories, his mother, Zofia, and grandmother, Olga, had a significant influence on his future attitude in life. Even before starting school, the future clergyman was entitled to a service at the parish church in Narew.

After finishing primary school, he entered the Orthodox Theological Seminary in Warsaw. After completing his first year of education, he went to the monastery of St. Onuphrius in Jabłeczna, declaring the intention to join the community as an obedient. While continuing his studies in the seminary, he regularly went to Jabłeczna to learn about monastic life. He was also active in the parish of St. Mary Magdalene. After the fourth year of studies at the seminary, he passed his secondary school-leaving examination.

After graduating from the lower classes of the seminary, at the urging of the metropolitan of Warsaw and all of Poland, Bazyli, he accepted the position of psalmist in the parish in Łosinka. In 1977, at his own request, he was dismissed from this function and began studying at the Higher Orthodox Theological Seminary in Jabłeczna.

=== Priest ===
In 1980 he graduated from the Orthodox Theological Seminary in Jabłeczna. He is also a graduate of the Christian Theological Academy. In 1977, he made his perpetual vows in the monastery of St. Onuphrius in Jabłeczna. On February 15, 1979, he was ordained deacon by the Metropolitan of Warsaw and the whole of Poland, Bazyli, and then ordained a priest by the Bishop of Lublin, Szymon.

In the years 1981–1983 he was the parish priest of the Orthodox parish in Komańcza, he also served in Polany and Zyndranowa, where on his initiative a new church was built. In the years 1983–1984 he co-organized the parish in Przemyśl. From 1984 he was the parish priest in Munich, serving also churches in Stuttgart, Ingolstadt, Augsburg, Regensburg, Landshut and Ludwigsburg.

In 1987, he became the superior of the monastery in Jabłeczna, on 7 January 1989, he was awarded the title of archimandrite. As the monastery superior, he continued the renovation of its buildings, begun by his predecessors, the archimandrites Sawa (Hrycuniak) and Nikon (Potapczuk).

=== Ordinary of the Lublin-Chełm diocese ===
On 25 March 1989, he accepted the episcopal chirotonia and became the ordinary of the newly created Lublin-Chełm diocese. On February 15, 1999, in the cathedral of St. Nicholas in Białystok, he was awarded the Order of the Holy Equal to the Apostles of Mary Magdalene of the 1st degree. In 2001 he was awarded the title of Archbishop.

As the bishop of the Lublin-Chełm diocese, he doubled the number of active Orthodox churches on its territory and led to the establishment of two new monasteries: a female monastery in Turkowice and a male monastery in Kostomłoty.

He represented the Polish Autocephalous Orthodox Church during official visits and foreign conferences: at the VIII International Russian Council (2004), at the canonization ceremony of Metropolitan Piotr (Mohyla) (2002) and at the enthronement of the Serbian Patriarch Irenej (2010).

He is an advocate of ecumenical dialogue. In 2000, together with the Catholic Archbishop of Lublin, Józef Życiński, he published a message to reunite everything in Christ. He is a co-chairman of the Catholic-Orthodox Bilateral Team.

In 2016, he became a member of the delegation of the Polish Autocephalous Orthodox Church to the Holy and Great Synod of The Orthodox Church.

== Honours and awards ==
=== Honours ===
==== National honours ====
- Poland:
  - Silver Cross of Merit
  - Silver Gloria Artis Medal

Eastern Orthodox Church titles
New title	Bishop of Lublin and Chełm; 1989–2001	Vacant
New title	Archbishop of Lublin and Chełm; 2001–present	Incumbent
