= Topólcza =

- Village
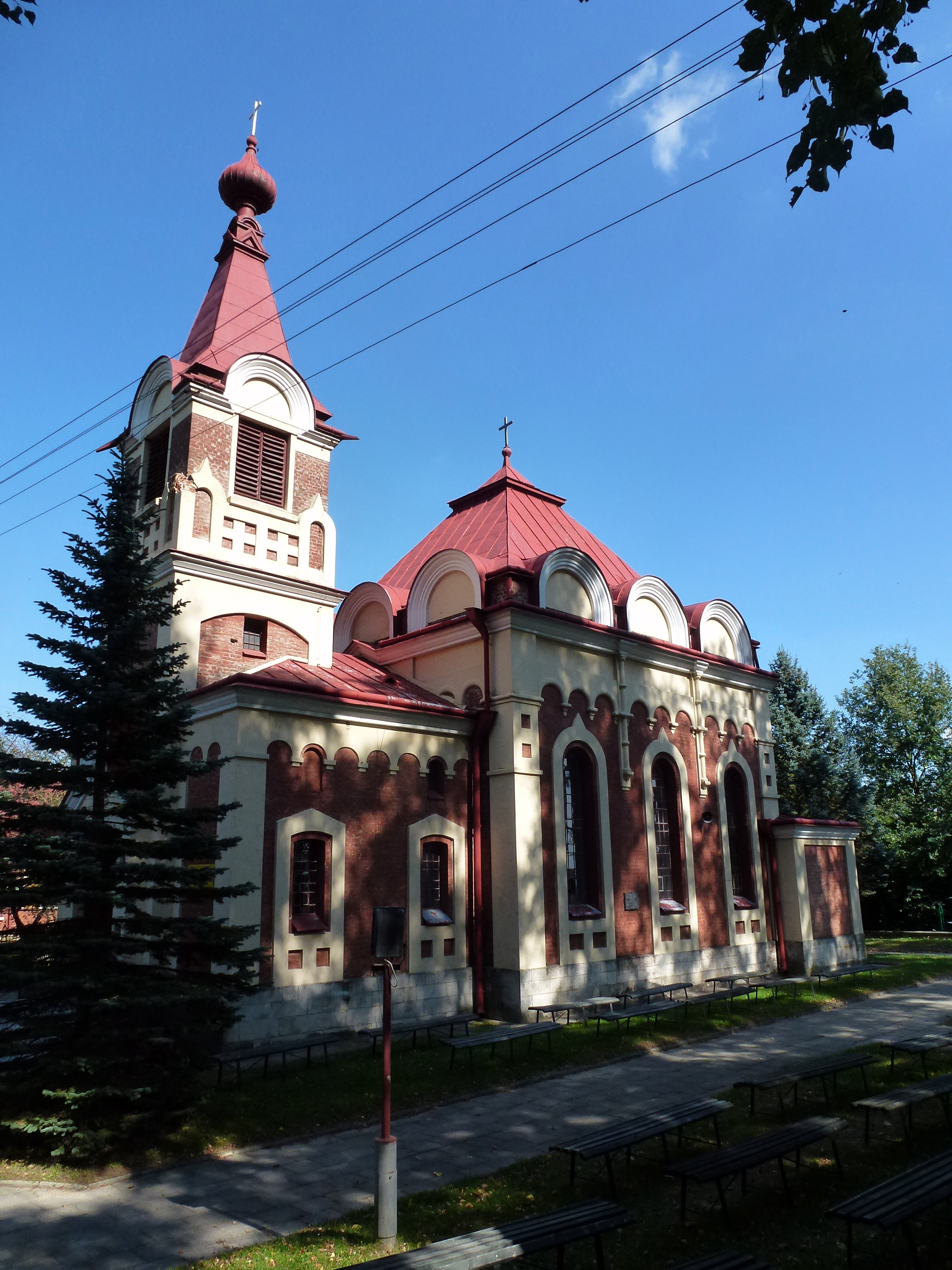

- Location within Poland
- Coordinates: 50°39′04″N 22°56′33″E
- Country: Poland
- Voivodeship: Lublin
- County: Zamość
- Gmina: Zwierzyniec
- Population (2021): 249

Topólcza is a village in the administrative district of Gmina Zwierzyniec, within Zamość County, Lublin Voivodeship, in eastern Poland.

In the village, there is a single-nave brick church in the Russian Revival style from the beginning of the 20th century. In the interwar period, the church was handed over to the Catholic Church and the domes were removed. Historical Orthodox icons have been preserved there.

The private noble village of Topólcza was located at the turn of the 16th and 17th centuries in the Chełm Land of the Ruthenian Voivodeship.

One of Topólcza's most distinctive modern features is Etno Roztocze (Ogród Zabaw). A "cultural sensory garden" designed to engage families with the traditional heritage of the Roztocze region. "Memorial Monument to the Fallen Foresters Zwierzyniec". Evendo.
