= St. Onuphrius Monastery in Jabłeczna =

Orthodox monastery in Jabłeczna, Poland

St. Onuphrius Monastery
- Monaster św. Onufrego
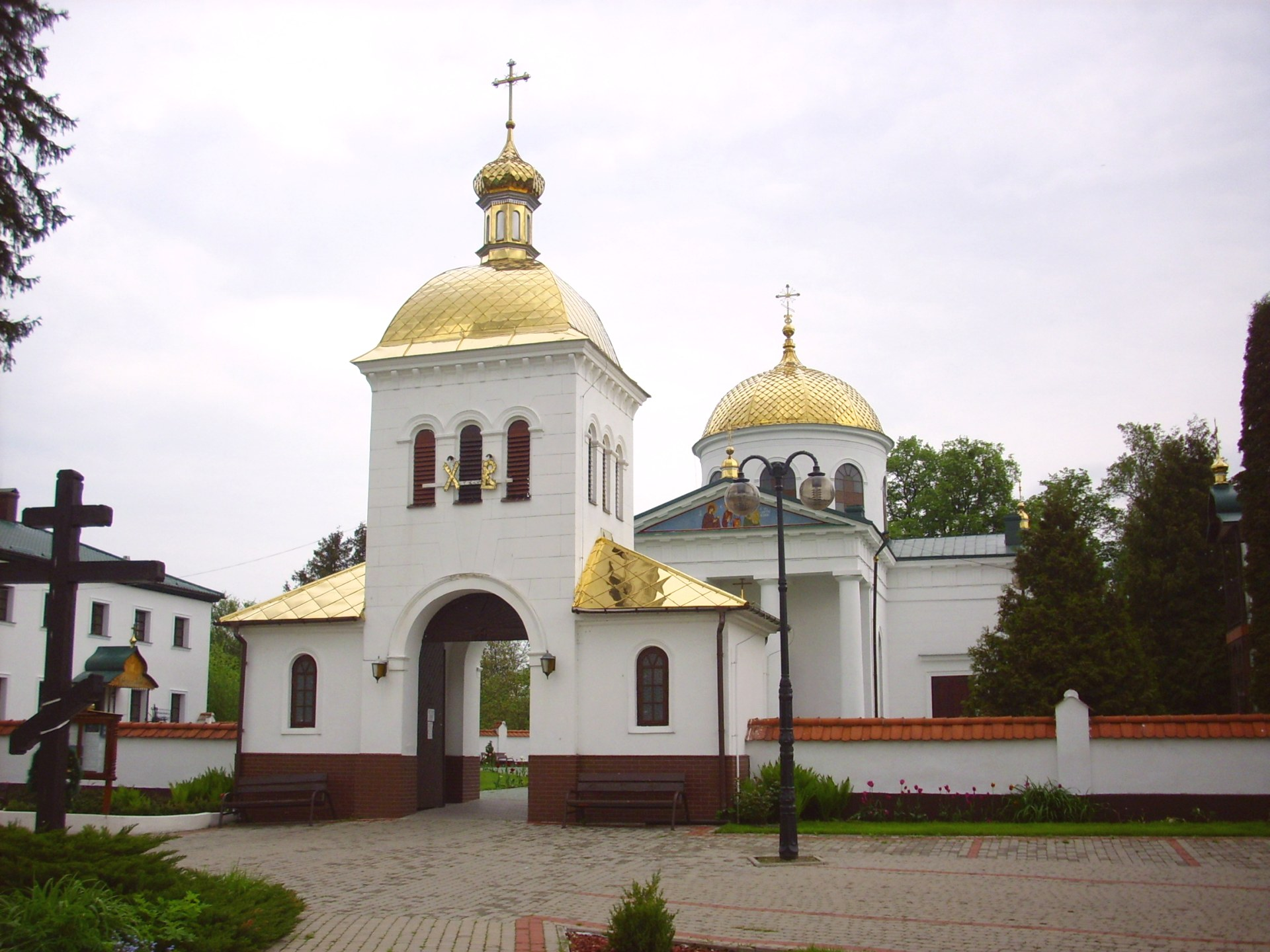
- St. Onuphrius Orthodox Church – the main temple of the monastery

- Location in Poland

Monastery information
- Order: Stauropegion
- Controlled churches: Polish Orthodox Church

People
- Founder: Jan Zabrzeziński
- House superior: Archimandrite Piotr (Dawidziuk)

Architecture
- Style: Neoclassical
- Completed date: before 1498

Site
- Location: Jabłeczna; 69 Jabłeczna Street
- Country: Poland
- Coordinates: 51°48′20″N 23°37′59″E
- Visible remains: Churches: St. Onuphrius Orthodox Church John the Evangelist Church; Chapels: Chapel of the Holy Spirit Chapel of the Dormition of the Most Holy Mother of God St. Athanasius of Brest Chapel
- Website: http://www.klasztorjableczna.pl/

St. Onuphrius Monastery is a stauropegion Orthodox male monastery in Jabłeczna, Poland, under the jurisdiction of the Polish Orthodox Church.

The monastery was founded no later than the late 15th century. According to legend, its establishment was determined by the miraculous appearance of the icon of St. Onuphrius above the Bug river. Thanks to successive land grants from the subsequent owners of Jabłeczna, the monastery became a significant center of Orthodox worship in Chełm Land. After the Union of Brest, the monks of Jabłeczna refused to accept its provisions and, despite pressure, remained Orthodox, remaining an important center of dissenters until the fall of the Polish–Lithuanian Commonwealth. The situation of the monastery underwent a total change after the three partitions of Poland and the establishment of the Congress Poland in personal union with Russia. From then on, the monastery was financially supported by the Russian authorities and, at their behest, engaged in promoting Orthodoxy and Russification of Chełm Land, especially after the conversion of Chełm Eparchy in 1875. This was one of the reasons why the monks engaged in social and educational activities. However, the low level of education of the monks, their insufficient number, and the fact that the majority of them were not of Russian nationality meant that the monastery did not fulfill its assigned tasks in terms of promoting Russianness and Orthodoxy among the population of Chełm Land.

Despite restrictions imposed by the authorities of independent Poland due to the role of the monastery during the partitions, the monastery functioned throughout the entire interwar period. During World War II, it was burned down in 1942 by a German border guard unit. However, it formally did not cease to function and remained active throughout the entire period of the Polish People's Republic, despite difficult material conditions (on the orders of the Stalinist authorities, it lost all its assets except residential buildings and churches), as the only male monastery of the Polish Orthodox Church.

Since 1999, it has had the status of a stauropegion monastery and is directly subordinate to the Metropolitan of Warsaw and all Poland, who manages the community through his representative. There is also a parish attached to the monastery, with the monastery's representative serving as its parson.

== History ==
=== Beginnings ===
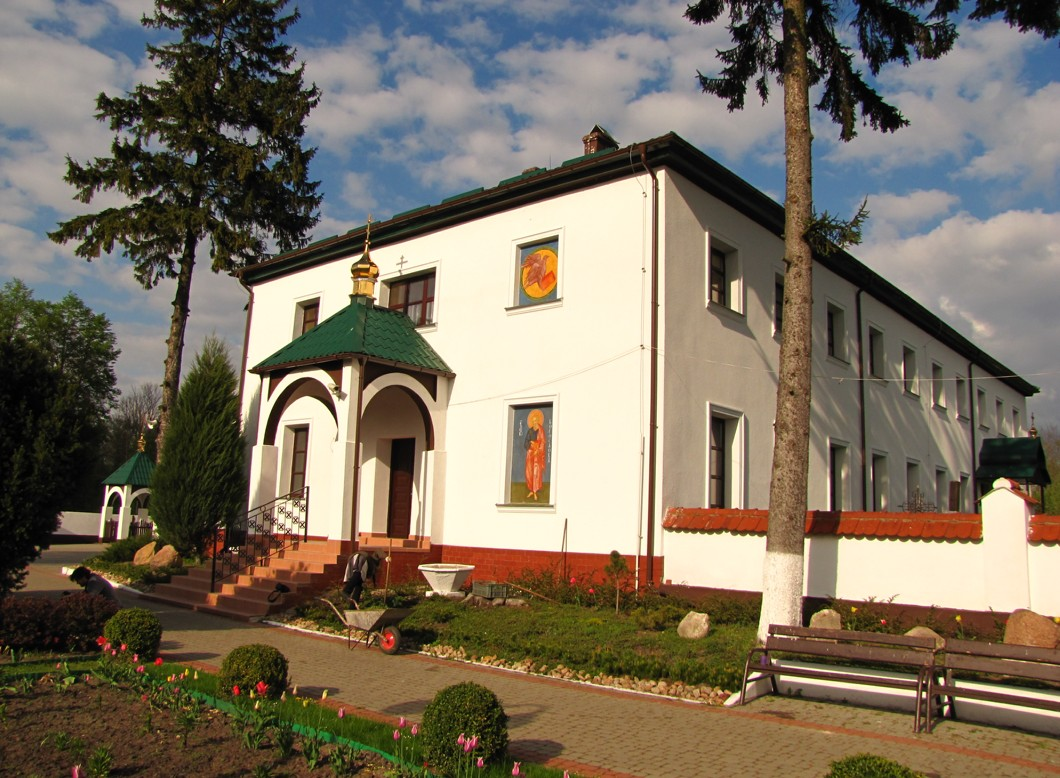
Residential building and a part of the garden

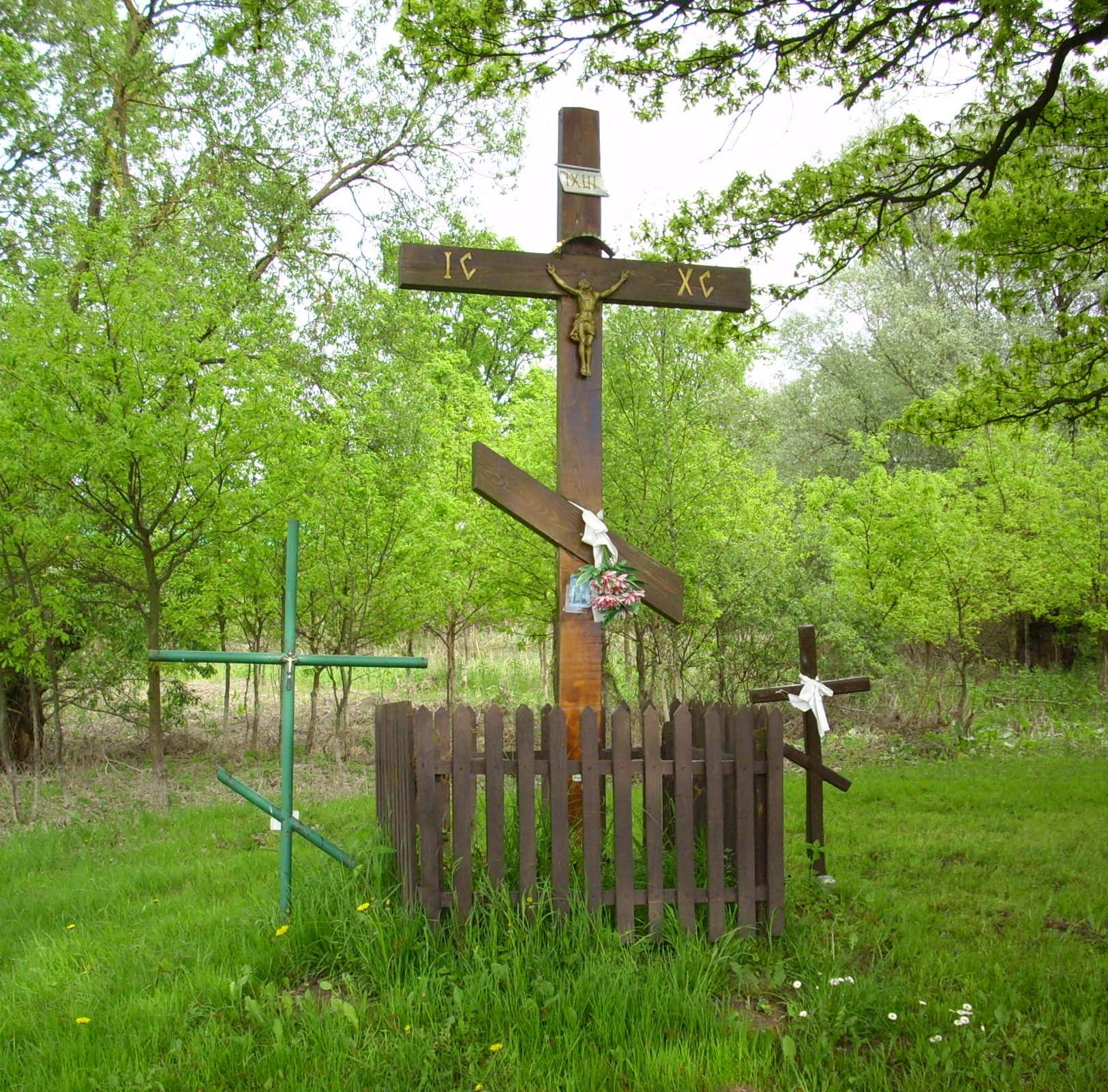
Crosses near the monastery

According to legend, the first monastic community in Jabłeczna was established when the icon of St. Onuphrius floated down the Bug river to the village. For this reason, he became the patron saint of the monastery. Another legend tells that St. Onuphrius appeared to a group of fishermen by the Bug river, announcing that his name would be glorified in that place. Later, an image of the hermit was found in the same spot by the riverbank, and the locals retrieved it and hung it on a tree, where they began to pray to the saint. Not wanting to leave the miraculous icon unattended in a remote location, a group of men remained by the oak tree permanently. They later built a chapel next to it and took monastic vows themselves. The cult of St. Onuphrius significantly developed in the western part of the Grand Duchy of Lithuania in the second half of the 15th century.

In older literature on the subject (works from the turn of the 19th and 20th centuries), there are views placing the establishment of the monastery in the 16th century (according to various authors, either at its beginning or closer to its end). According to Father Serafim Żeleźniakowicz, the author of the most comprehensive monograph dedicated to the monastery, this view does not hold up in the light of newer research. In 1522, the monastery in Jabłeczna is already mentioned in a document issued by King Sigismund I the Old. In another document from 1527, the monastery is described as a community that has existed for a longer time. The presence of the Great Schema Cyril, who took his vows in 1516, also indicates the longer existence of the community. Vows of this degree could only be taken in a community with a longer tradition.

Some authors active at the turn of the 19th and 20th centuries placed the establishment of the monastery in an even more distant past, pointing to the mid-13th century (Father F. Gorbaczowski). Father Żeleźniakowicz also considers this view insufficiently documented. However, Antoni Mironowicz considers the establishment of the monastery in this period possible. The monastery certainly existed before 1498, as the oldest Gospel Book preserved in the monastery dates back to that year. This could have been presented to the monks at the founding of the community, but it could also have been passed to the monastery already in existence. In 1527, the residents of Brest presented the monks with a manuscript containing their rule, probably from 1487. The probable founder of the monastery was the Zabrzeziński (Zaberezinski) family, the owners of the village of Jabłeczna. However, establishing this fact beyond any doubt is not possible due to the disappearance of relevant documents in the 18th century. Another document, issued in 1499, granting the village of Jabłeczna to Mikołaj Nassut, indicates that the monastery functioned in the village but was treated as a separate enclave.

=== Monastery's growing importance as a center of worship ===
From 1527 comes a document confirming that pilgrims from Berestechko participated in the monastery's patronal feast. The entire 16th century was a period of gradual increase in the authority of the monastery. However, until the Union of Brest, it remained a center of cult with only regional significance. The document from 1527 indicates that the abbot of the monastery was Hegumen Cyril, and besides him, there were at least two monks in the monastery.

Successive owners of Jabłeczna – the Zabrzeziński, Nassut, Bohowitynowicz, Bogusz, Proński, Leszczyński, Sapieha, and Kodeński families – supported the monastery materially. Through the grants they received, the monastery acquired 1,400 hectares of arable land, forests, and meadows on both banks of the Bug river. Special benefactors of the monastery were Teodora Andriyivna Bohowitynowicz (née Sanguszko) and her daughter Teodora Bohowitynowicz, later Prońska, who remained a patroness of the community even after her husband converted to Catholicism.

=== From the conclusion of the Union of Brest to the fall of the Polish–Lithuanian Commonwealth ===
The monks of the Jabłeczna monastery did not accept the provisions of the Union of Brest, and the monastery became a center of Orthodox resistance against its implementation. Monks opposed to the union from those monasteries that decided to accept it joined the community. The Jabłeczna monastery became the residence of the Orthodox Bishop of Chełm, Paisius Cherkawski, who lived there and simultaneously served as the abbot until his death in 1633. After Paisius' death, the monastery remained without a superior for several years. In order to change this situation, the owner of Jabłeczna, Władysław Leszczyński, turned to the abbot of the Mielce monastery, Archimandrite Joseph, requesting a monk capable of leading the community in Jabłeczna. This occurred no later than the early 1640s; Hieromonk Makary (Kornilovich) arrived in Jabłeczna at that time. He initiated a moral renewal in the community and carried out a general renovation of its buildings. In the 17th century, the monastery complex consisted of the Church of St. Onuphrius with the Chapel of the Meeting of the Lord, a refectory with the Church of the Dormition of the Mother of God, a bell tower (built in 1651), the abbot's house, monks' cells, and farm buildings. The renovation of the monastery was completed around 1659. In the same year, Metropolitan Dionysius Balaban of Kyiv expressed his recognition of Makary's activities in writing; Makary already held the rank of hegumen at that time. The clergyman died in 1677, enjoying immense authority among the monks.

In 1670, the Jabłeczna monastery became the last Orthodox pastoral outpost in the region. When the Monastery of St. Nicholas in Mielce accepted the provisions of the Union, of which the Jabłeczna community was a filial, with the help of the owner of Jabłeczna, Andrzej Leszczyński, the monks came under the direct jurisdiction of the Orthodox bishops of Lutsk. After the Lutsk diocese joined the Uniate Church, the superior of the monastery became the Orthodox Metropolis of Kyiv. The prestige of the monastery among the Orthodox population grew as the number of monasteries of this denomination in the Commonwealth decreased. From 1 March 1681, the pastoral activity of the monks was further restricted: on this date, a decree from King John III Sobieski was issued to "non-Uniate" communities, prohibiting Orthodox clergy from serving in villages where Uniate churches were located. During this period, a significant portion of the parishioners of the Jabłeczna pastoral outpost came from villages where former Orthodox churches were in the hands of the Uniats, and who did not want to convert to Catholicism.

The situation of the monastery changed radically in 1699, when the Jabłeczna estates were purchased by Karol Stanisław Radziwiłł, a Catholic (unlike the previous owners of the village). The Radziwiłł family exerted strong pressure on the monastery to join the Uniate Church, and, using their patronage rights, forced the local clergy to convert in the parish. in 1701, in order to defend their position, the monastery submitted as a filial to the Monastery of the Holy Spirit in Vilnius. In 1724, the monastery was deprived of four parish churches. In 1752, Hieronim Florian Radziwiłł founded a Uniate church in the village of Jabłeczna. The Uniate parish took over a significant part of the monastery's property and contributed to the conversion of the local population to the Union. Three years later, an armed attack on the monastery took place, in which Basilian monks from the monastery in Biała Podlaska also participated. During the attack, the monastery was plundered, and documents stored in it were stolen, including those confirming land ownership. Nevertheless, the Jabłeczna community remained faithful to Orthodoxy. From 1767, the monastery received regular financial support from the Kyiv Metropolis. Despite this, its financial situation was very poor in 1770, which was related to poor management by Hegumen Moses, who fled the monastery that year.

A description of the monastery from 1775 indicates that it contained a wooden, triple-domed temple, 36 ells (21 meters) long, 27.5 ells (16 meters) wide, and 53 ells (31.5 meters) high. Separate buildings included a bell tower, a refectory with a church, a bakery, and a kitchen. To the northeast was the abbot's house. Seven monk cells were located in two buildings to the south, and one was in the bell tower. The monks also had a granary, two food warehouses, two stables, and a bathhouse. These buildings were in poor technical condition and required renovation. Among the movable property of the monastery were mentioned 25 sets of priestly vestments in the sacristy, as well as six Gospel Books, 16 candlesticks, and two chandeliers. The monastery had a library, and there were five bells in the bell tower. Describing the monastery in 1785, Bishop of Pereiaslav, Viktor Sadkovsky, claimed that he found not monastery buildings on the site, but rather ruins. In 1793, the community lived in extreme poverty, and money for necessary building repairs was obtained through collections in other monasteries.

=== Period of partitions ===
==== 1795–1875 ====
As a result of the provisions of the Third Partition of Poland, the land of Chełm found itself within the borders of Austria, which meant that the monastery in Jabłeczna came under the jurisdiction of the Bukovinian Metropolis. However, due to the distance of the metropolitans' seat from Jabłeczna, it still remained under the actual spiritual care of the bishops of Minsk. After the establishment of the Congress Kingdom, which was in a personal union with the Russian Empire, the Orthodox structures in the Congress Kingdom, including the monastery, were incorporated into the Diocese of Minsk. Father Żeleźniakowicz disagreed with the view that the jurisdiction of the bishops of Minsk over the Jabłeczna community was formally extended in 1815, stating that according to him, the monastery came under their control only in 1825, as there were no clear regulations in this regard before. In 1840, an independent Warsaw and Novohrad-Volynsky Eparchy was established, covering the territory of the Kingdom, and it was under its jurisdiction that the monastery fell. In 1816, the monastery was inhabited by three monks. Their main source of livelihood was land cultivation. The financial situation of the monastery in the 1820s was so difficult that in 1828 it was granted assistance in the amount of 2,000 złotys from the fund for the Greco-Russian clergy. Throughout the 1820s and 1830s, the monastery was involved in legal proceedings over the management of the lands with Count Michał Grabowski, who had received some of the land on lease as early as 1787 and then refused to return it after the leases expired. At that time, it was already the only Orthodox monastery in the Chełm and Podlasie region; it also served as a retirement home for retired clergy. In 1832, due to the poverty of the monastery, Father Teofil Nowicki, who served as the dean of churches and monasteries in the Kingdom of Poland, obtained a partial tax exemption for it, and in 1833, another grant of 300 rubles. In that year, the monastery was inhabited by five monks, a lay brother, and a widowed priest without monastic vows.

According to a description from 1835, the monastery owned 45 dessiatins of land on the left bank of the Bug river and 46 dessiatins of meadows on the right bank. The poverty of the monastery did not diminish its authority among the faithful, which remained very significant. In 1836, the Jabłeczna community consisted of 5 monks.

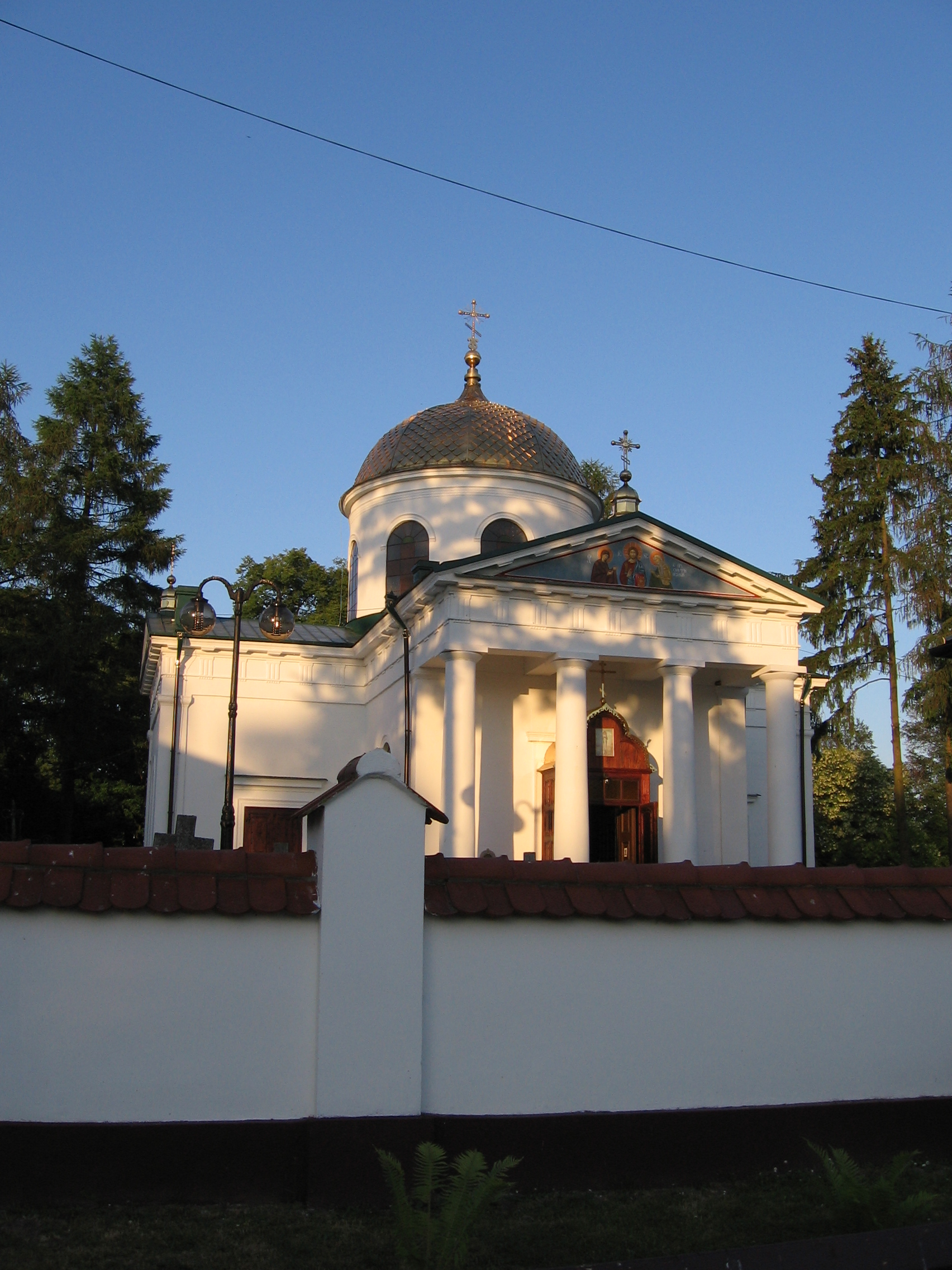
Neoclassical Church of St. Onuphrius in the monastery complex was built between 1838 and 1840

Due to the very poor technical condition of the monastery buildings, work began in 1838 on the construction of a new residential building for the monks, the Church of St. Onuphrius, a bell tower, and a surrounding wall. According to Grzegorz Kuprianowicz, the initiator of these works was Bishop Antoni of Warsaw. According to Father Żeleźniakowicz, the initiator of the renovation was Bishop Innocenty of Volhynia, who had been calling for it since his visit to Jabłeczna in 1833, and Bishop Antoni only completed his efforts. On 19 May 1838, the cornerstone for the construction of the Church of St. Onuphrius was laid, and its dedication took place on 6 December 1840. The cost of its construction, together with the cost of building the residential building, amounted to 29,585 rubles. During the tenure of Archimandrite Joannicius (Mosakowski) as the monastery's superior, from 1832 to 1854, a two-class school open to all, regardless of denomination, was opened in 1838, and the agricultural estate was reorganized.

In 1857, 24 students attended the school run by the monastery. In 1843, the Jabłeczna community consisted of 5 monks and 4 lay brothers, the following year – 6 monks and 1 lay brother, and in 1845 – 5 monks and 3 lay brothers. In the middle of the century, the monastery was home to 5 monks, 5 lay brothers, two widowed deacons, and one widowed priest.

In a report by the Archbishop of Warsaw to the Most Holy Synod, the monastery in Jabłeczna was described as a center of high spiritual level. In 1859, the monastery, which had hitherto functioned as non-regular, was entered into the register of second-class monasteries, receiving a higher government subsidy; at the same time, it was obliged to maintain a community of 16 monks, including the superior. This obligation was not respected in practice. The report from 1861 indicated that only six monks and seven lay brothers lived in the monastery, with vacancies for the remaining positions. The exemplary functioning of the monastery was emphasized. Until 1859, the monastery received 300 rubles for the maintenance of the monks and 1,200 rubles for running the school, and from 1859, this sum increased to a total of 3,720 rubles. The increased government subsidy meant that by 1863, the monastery had savings of 5,050 rubles deposited in the bank and could sustain itself from the interest.

In 1862, a school of icon painting was also organized in the monastery, but the period of its operation is not established. Hieromonk Palladius served as the iconography teacher, and in the first year of the school's operation, 13 students from the general school run by the monastery attended. According to Father Żeleźniakowicz, the courses in icon painting did not last long, as there are no mentions of them in documents from 1868 onwards.

During the January Uprising, a Polish insurgent unit entered the monastery, searching for money. The insurgents disrupted the course of the evening service and destroyed part of the furnishings of the Church of St. Onuphrius. However, thanks to the intervention of the local Catholic priest, the unit withdrew without causing major damage to the monastery.

In 1863, the monastery was inhabited by 10 monks and 8 lay brothers. The school they ran had 38 students, 14 of whom were of the Catholic faith.

==== 1875–1915 ====
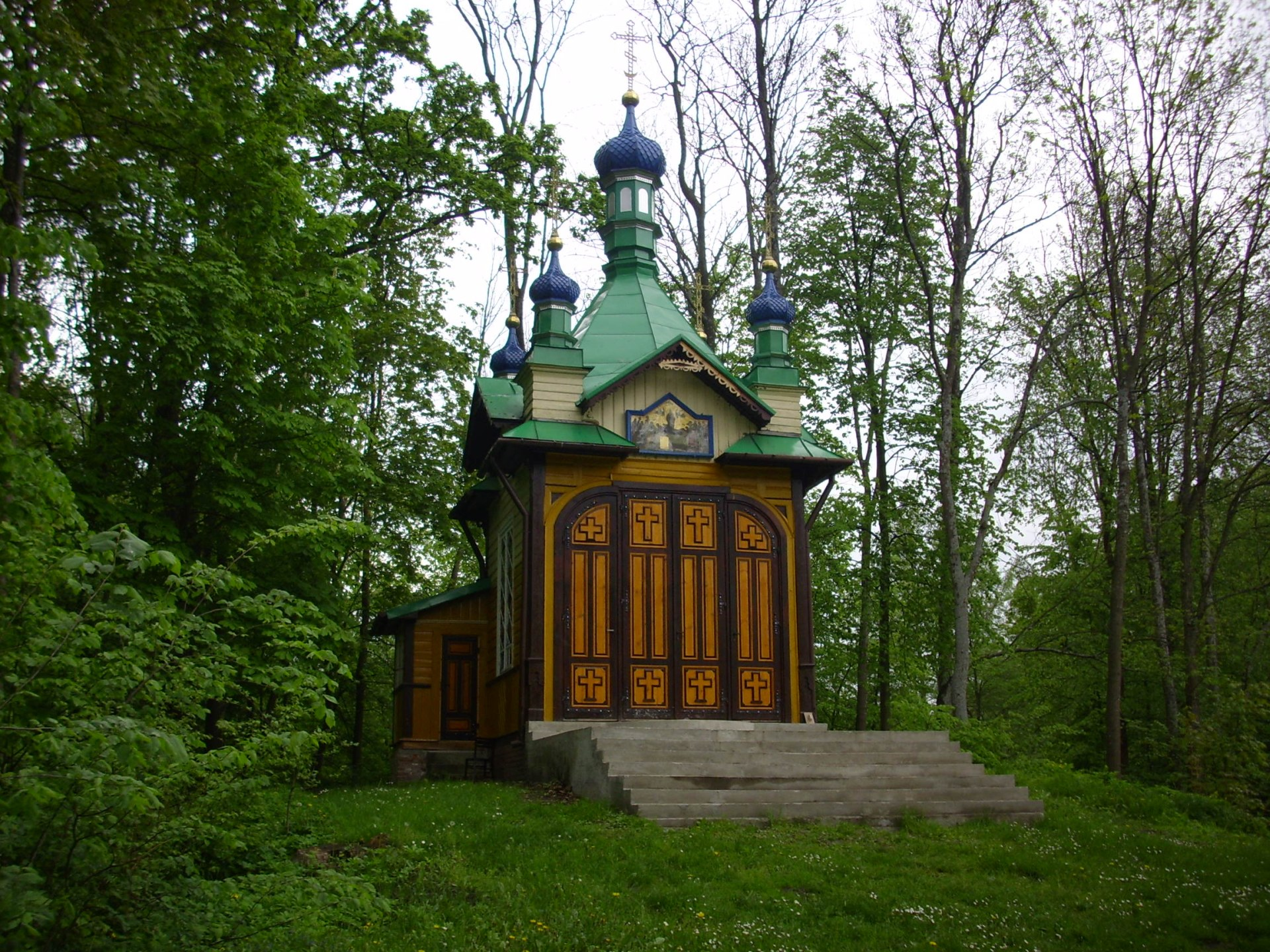
Chapel of the Dormition of the Most Holy Mother of God, erected in 1908

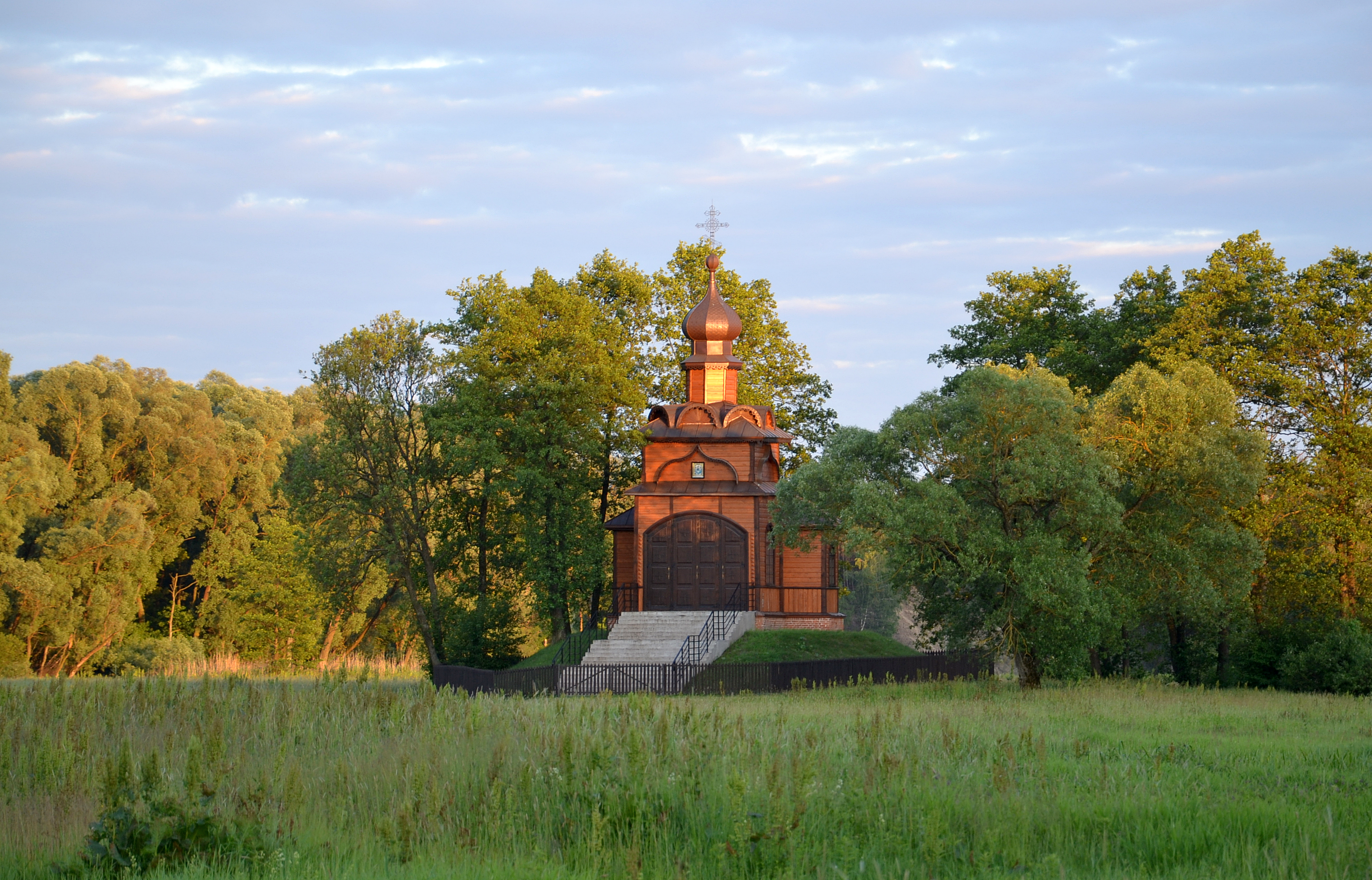
Chapel of the Holy Spirit, erected in 1908

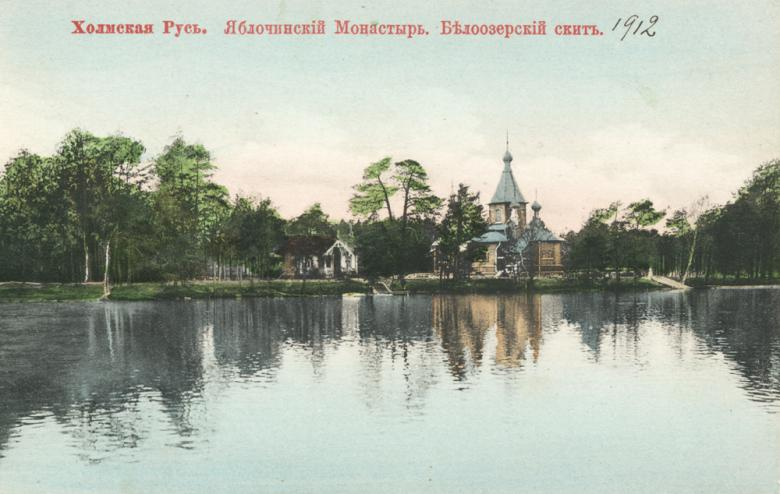
Skete of Saints Sergius and Herman, a branch of Jabłeczna Monastery (view from 1909); the church was moved to Omelanets in 1925

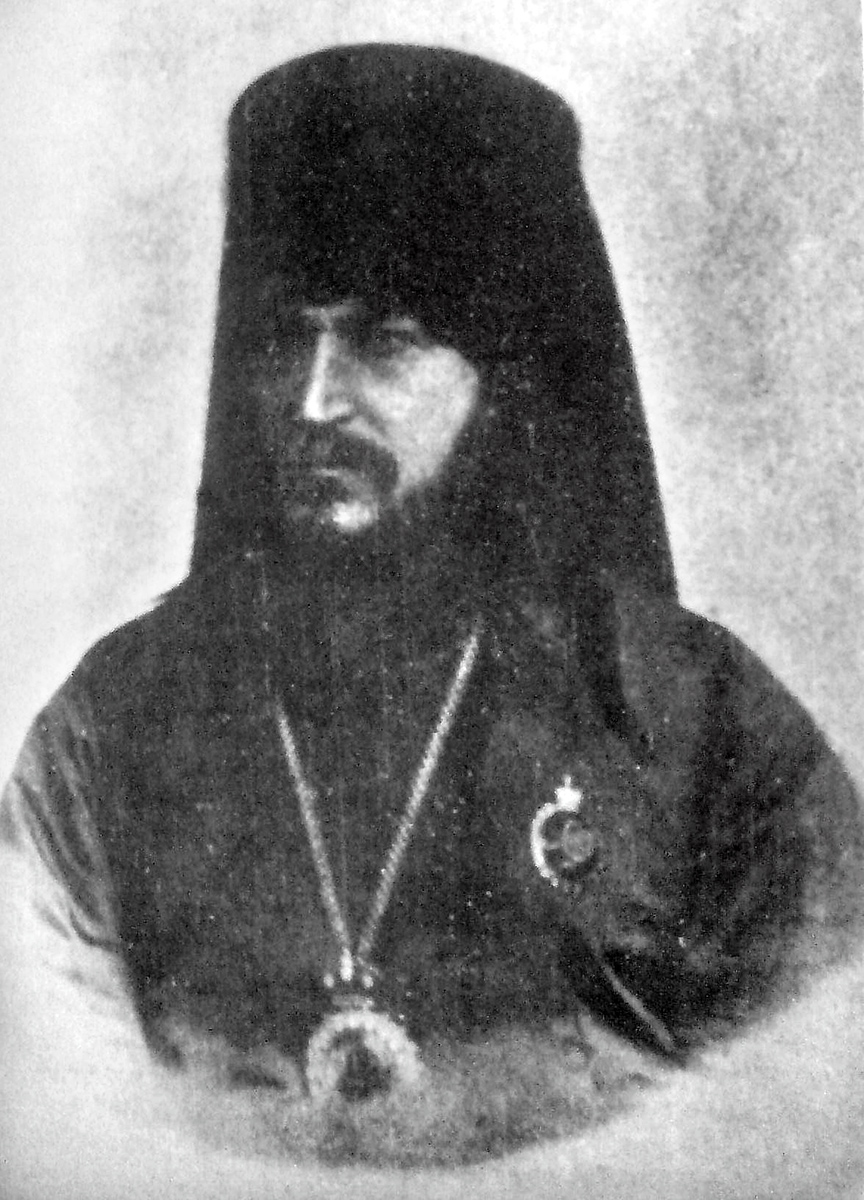
German (Ivanov), superior of the monastery from 1897 to 1900

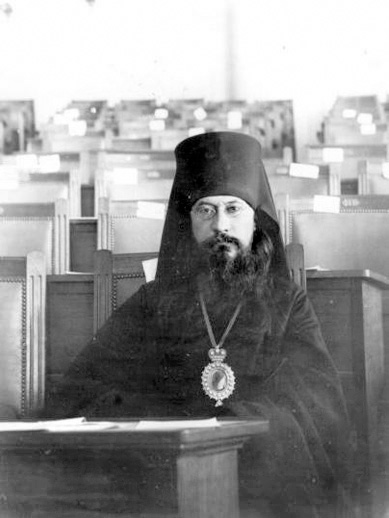
Bishop Eulogius (Georgiyevsky), as bishop of Chełm and then of Lublin, took special care of the Jabłeczna community

In 1875, the monastery housed 10 monks and 6 lay brothers. This number only experienced slight fluctuations until the end of the decade. After the administrative abolition of the last diocese of the Uniate Church in the Russian Empire, carried out by the tsarist administration and the military in 1875, the entire activity of the monastery was subordinated to the goal of consolidating Orthodoxy in Chełm Land. Upon explicit orders from the tsarist authorities, the monks undertook a broader social and missionary work among the local Catholic population and former Uniates, expanding the already existing school from their own funds and admitting 50 people in 1880. After 1889, they also ran a school for psalmists for newly established Orthodox parishes in the region. Candidates for teachers in parish schools were trained in a separate facility. Previously, the monastery clergy did not participate in the policy of Russification. The monks made significant contributions to the development of education among the rural population of the region. Thanks to the efforts of Archimandrite Narcissus in 1862, they obtained an increase in the subsidy for the school's operation, which allowed them to admit 62 children to study from 1881.

From 1876 to 1880, further expansion and renovation of the monastery were carried out, including the construction of a two-story residential building for the monks. In the 1880s, the Bug river's course was also changed, resulting in the monastery being situated on the left bank of the river. Thanks to tsarist grants, it owned a landed estate – 1,207.51 dessiatins, including arable land, pastures, and forests.

In 1881, Archbishop Leontius of Warsaw appealed to the Most Holy Synod to classify the Jabłeczna monastery among the first-class monasteries due to its historical and contemporary significance. In the same year, the Jabłeczna community consisted of 9 monks and 23 lay brothers. In January 1882, this request was positively considered. In 1886, the monastery was inhabited by nine monks and a "significant number" of lay brothers. The superior, Archimandrite Narcissus, enjoyed considerable spiritual authority among the local population. However, by 1896, in a letter to the Most Holy Synod, Bishop Flavian of Lublin claimed that the monastery, as a missionary center (and therefore, a planned center of Russification), did not meet the hopes placed in it: the community consisted of only nine monks, which did not allow it to strengthen the monastery's authority. Local faithful only attended the monastery for worship on its major holidays, and the poverty of the community discouraged potential monk candidates. Flavian concluded that the monastery had no influence on the local population, including former Uniates, whom it was supposed to solidify in Orthodoxy. According to Father Żeleźniakowicz's assessment, such a significant decline in the monastery was the result of the incompetence of its superior, Archimandrite Joannicius, who arrived in Jabłeczna in 1887 after the death of Archimandrite Narcissus, as well as the lack of support for the monastery from the Chełm-Warsaw Eparchy. In 1896, the school run by the monks was moved from the monastery buildings to new facilities in the village of Jabłeczna. The monastery's situation began to improve after Archimandrite German Ivanov assumed the position of superior in 1897. His efforts to strengthen the monastery's role in the social life of Chełm Land were limited by the fact that the monks from Jabłeczna were poorly educated, and their number did not increase. The archimandrite opened an orphanage, a soup kitchen for the poorest, and an outpatient clinic. By managing the monastery's income well, he also improved its financial situation. This translated into the number of candidates willing to join the monastery – in 1899, the monastery housed 39 monks and lay brothers (for comparison, there were 12 monks in 1889, and nine in 1896). However, those joining the monastery were primarily peasants with education levels that did not allow them to participate in missionary activities in line with the policies of the tsarist authorities. Despite this, the monastery's prestige significantly increased, and it became an important pilgrimage center. Archbishop Hieronymus Ekziemplarski of Chełm and Warsaw praised Archimandrite German's work in 1900. German (Ivanov) died after a short illness in 1903; his successor, Archimandrite Arkadiusz (Wielmożyn), due to his advanced age, did not continue his predecessor's social activities on the same scale.

From 1905, the monastery belonged to the newly established Eparchy of Chełm. Given the fact that the same year's tolerant decree led to the conversion of approximately 180–200 thousand former Uniates from the Orthodox Church to Roman Catholicism, the Jabłeczna monastery was assigned an even greater role in promoting Orthodoxy and Russian identity. However, Bishop Eulogius of Chełm, particularly involved in promoting Orthodoxy in Chełm Land and Russification activities, argued that the monastery was unable to fulfill the tasks set before it. He emphasized especially that there were no clerics with secondary education among the monks. Therefore, in 1906, there were considerations to close the monastery due to its failure to fulfill its tasks. Ultimately, the Most Holy Synod recognized that the oldest functioning monastic community in Podlasie should remain active and, after reorganization, could play its designated role as a center of Orthodoxy and Russian identity. Therefore, a new superior, Archimandrite Joseph Petrovykh, was appointed, and he was tasked with renewing the monastery's internal life. Upon his arrival in Jabłeczna, Archimandrite Joseph reorganized the monastery school. He also revitalized the declining monastery farm. In 1908, approximately 100 people were studying there.

On the night of August 5–6, 1906, the monastery was attacked by unknown armed perpetrators, but it did not suffer significant losses. In 1907, it housed 16 monks and 19 lay brothers.

In 1907, after Archimandrite Joseph was delegated to serve in Novgorod, the community elected Archimandrite Serafin Ostroumov as his successor. Until then, superiors were appointed from above by the synod. In this case, in January of the following year, it merely confirmed the decision of the monks.

In 1913, the community consisted of 80 monks and lay brothers, and in 1914, it decreased to 68. The St. Onuphrius Monastery also opened its branches. In 1909, on an island in Lake Białe, the skete of the Holy Sergius and Herman of Valaam was established. The construction of the skete, which included a wooden church and a house for the monks, cost 50,000 rubles. Since 1912, the monks took care of the church of St. Nicholas in Dratów. The monastery complex itself was also expanded: a chapel of the Meeting of the Lord (now dedicated to the Holy Spirit) was built on the site where, according to legend, the icon of St. Onuphrius was found, and opposite the monastery gate, the Church of the Dormition of the Mother of God was erected. A two-ton bell cast in Moscow was placed in the main monastery church. From 1906 to 1910, another renovation of the monastery buildings was carried out. As part of this renovation, Ivan Wolski adorned the Church of St. Onuphrius with frescoes. The solemn consecration of the renovated temple took place on 16 December 1907, in a ceremony attended by bishops Andronik Nikolsky and Tryphon Turkestanov.

In 1911, in addition to the existing monastery school, the monks opened a two-class school in the village of Otoki, where 62 children studied, and a lower one-class school in Jabłeczna, intended for 60 people. In the same year, a vocational school was established, attended by about 50 people. The institution's program included practical courses in agriculture, gardening, veterinary medicine, forestry, dairy farming, and beekeeping. The establishment of these schools was associated with the promotion of Orthodoxy through the monks' social activities. In 1914, the last year of the monastery's operation in the established form after 1875, 431 people were studying in all the schools run by them. Additionally, in 1912, 1,760 people benefited from free medicines issued at the monastery pharmacy, and in 1913, 4,500 free meals were distributed. The monastic way of life was based on the rule of St. Basil the Great with elements of specific traditions drawn from the Optina Monastery, the Sarov Monastery, and the monasteries of Kyiv. The period of the monastery's final years of operation in Tsarist Russia, as Father Żeleźniakowicz called it, was its golden age. The monastery once again became an important pilgrimage center.

On 22 December 1914, a fire broke out in the monastery, completely destroying the building housing the pharmacy and the outpatient clinic.

=== Interwar period ===
On 1 August 1915, most of the monks, except for Hieromonk Hiob (Dyczko), went into exile, taking with them the icon of St. Onuphrius. They reached Moscow and settled in the Epiphany Monastery, where they were received by Bishop Tryphon (Turkiestanov), who had visited Jabłeczna several times before. After the German troops entered the Chełm region (two days after the monks' departure), the monastery buildings were taken over for military purposes, and Hieromonk Hiob was arrested.

The monks returned to Jabłeczna in 1918 or 1919. The first to arrive at the monastery was Hieromonk Mitrofan (Stelmaszuk), and on 20 September 1919, the superior, Archimandrite Sergius Korolov, returned. The monastery was devastated and in need of reconstruction. In the early years of the monastery's existence in independent Poland, its activities were limited by local authorities. In September 1919, the Church of St. Onuphrius was closed, and the parish church in Jabłeczna, as Uniate property, was handed over to the Catholic Church. Additionally, the Catholic diocese of Siedlce and the parish priest of the Catholic parish in Sławatycze took actions for the complete liquidation of the monastery. Inspired by them, the local population gathered at rallies demanding its closure. The parish in Sławatycze, without a proper court ruling, also took over most of the monastery's lands. In 1922, Polish authorities expelled the monastery's superior, Bishop Sergius (Korolow) of Bielsko, who as a monk had been involved in strengthening Orthodoxy in the Chełm region and had opposed the autocephaly of the Orthodox Church in Poland after 1918. In 1920, after intervention by representatives of the Orthodox Church in the Ministry of Religious Affairs and Public Education, the monks regained the Church of St. Onuphrius. During its closure, part of its equipment was looted and transferred to the church in Jabłeczna. The monks also regained the church in Dratów.

In 1924, the number of monks living in the monastery was limited to four, and the land taken from the local Catholics was officially confiscated. Throughout the interwar period, there was talk of liquidating the monastery and deploying a military unit in its buildings. In 1921, the governor of Lublin appealed for the closure of the monastery, accusing the monks of anti-state activities. In the same year, most of the monastery buildings were awarded to the Catholic parish in Jabłeczna, with Orthodox being allowed to keep only 30 morgen of land and "necessary premises". However, the state abandoned support for further claims by the Catholic Church against the monastery (still pursued in 1929) after receiving convincing documents from the Metropolitan of Warsaw and All Poland, indicating that the monastery had never belonged to Catholics. The monastery also failed to obtain permission to operate a parish due to the opinion of the Biała Podlaska starosta, who cited the past involvement of Orthodox clergy in the Russification of the Chełm region.

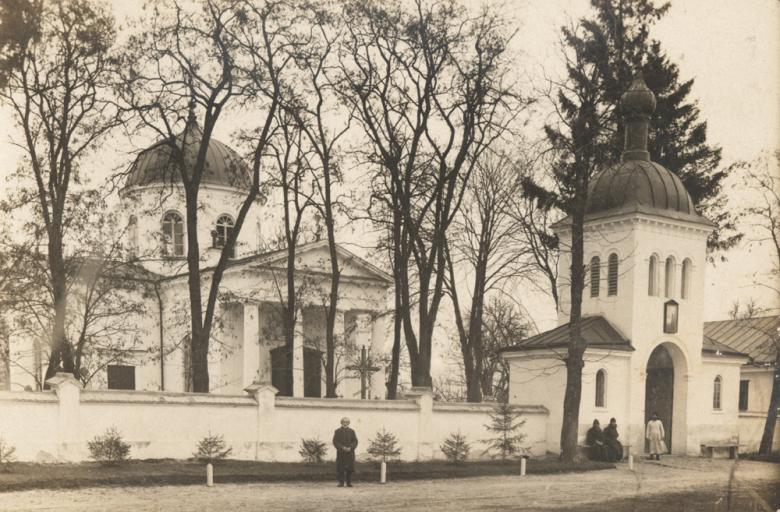
Entrance gate and St. Onuphrius Church, view from 1930

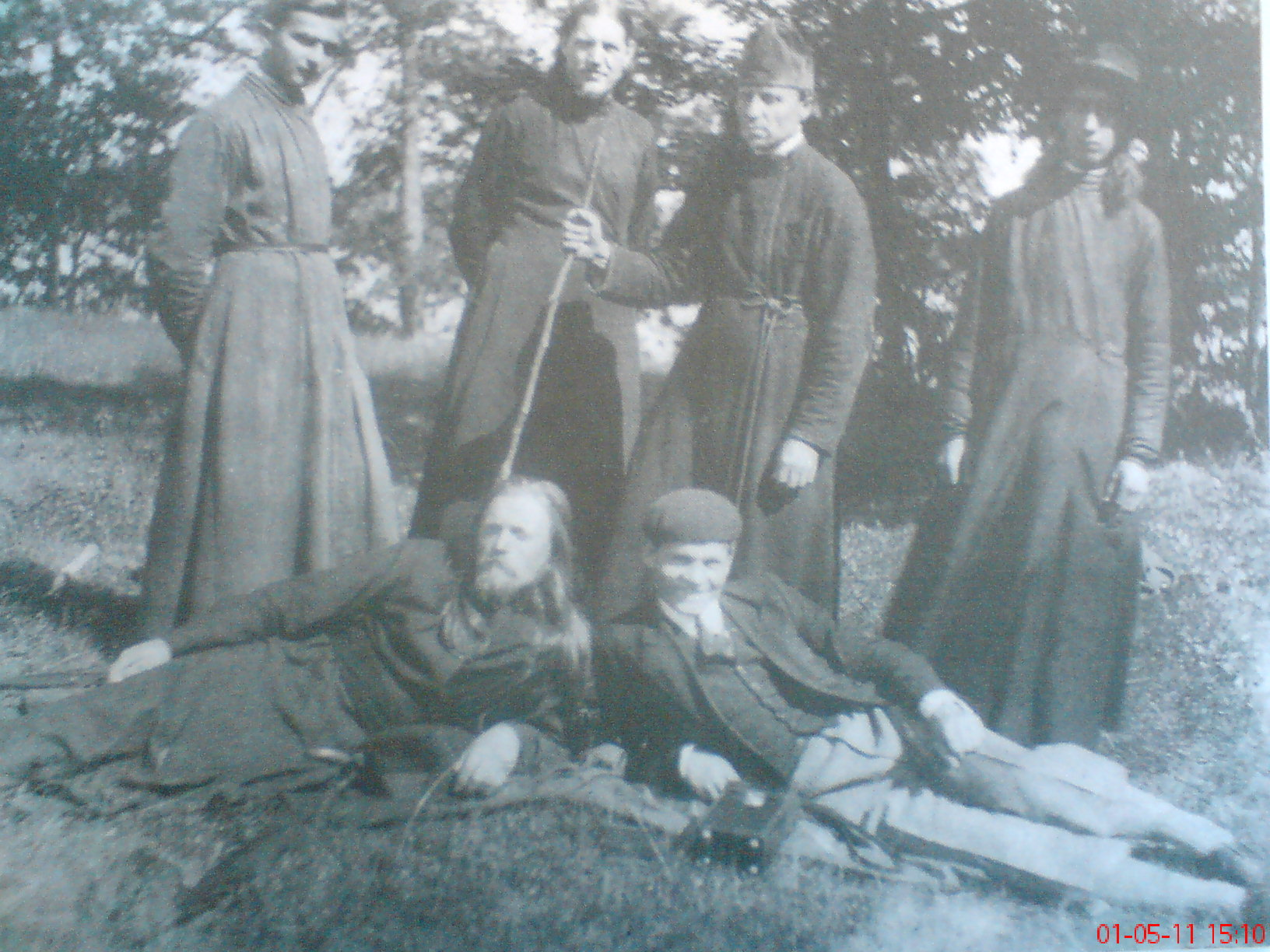
Group of monks and lay workers at the monastery in Jabłeczna, 1930s

From 1924 to 1927, a shelter for Orthodox children, relocated from Otwock, operated in Jabłeczna near the monastery. Throughout its existence, the monks remained in conflict with its director, Aleksei Tarasov, who hindered the monks from using the monastery's premises and inventory. In 1927, desiring to carry out renovation of the monastery, Metropolitan Dionysius of Warsaw and All Poland requested a subsidy of 5,000 złoty from the Ministry of Religious Affairs and Public Education, which he did not receive due to a negative opinion from the Lublin governor submitted at the ministry's request. The renovation was ultimately carried out without state assistance in the 1930s and involved some of the monastery buildings.

In 1929, the monks from Jabłeczna ran a home for retired Orthodox clergy in the monastery. Since 1934, they also organized two-year courses for psalmists, and since 1936, for deacons, and shortly before the outbreak of World War II, they opened a religious teacher training institute. In the 1930s, the monastery's superiors planned to make educational and charitable activities the main focus of its social work.

In 1929, the monastery was inhabited by nine monks. By 1935, this number had increased to fifteen. They were mostly Ukrainians or Belarusians. Throughout the interwar period, the monastery faced serious financial problems. Revenues from leasing land to local peasants, running a farm, donations from the faithful, candle sales, and sales from the monastery shop were so low that in the 1920s the monastery was in debt, and in the 1930s, it achieved a favorable financial balance thanks to the help of central management bodies of the Polish Orthodox Church. To improve their situation, the monks were forced to sell the Skete of Saints Sergius and Herman on Lake Białe in 1925, which was acquired by the Orthodox parish in Omielce.

In the late 1930s, the monastery complex consisted of four churches (two chapels, the Church of St. Onuphrius, the domestic chapel of St. John the Theologian), the superior's house, a brick residential building, a pilgrim house, a granary, a stable, three cowsheds, a house in the orchard, and a devastated residential building, the renovation of which was not carried out due to lack of funds. The monastery library contained 1,319 volumes, of which a thousand were on religious topics and 319 secular.

=== World War II and the early post-war years ===
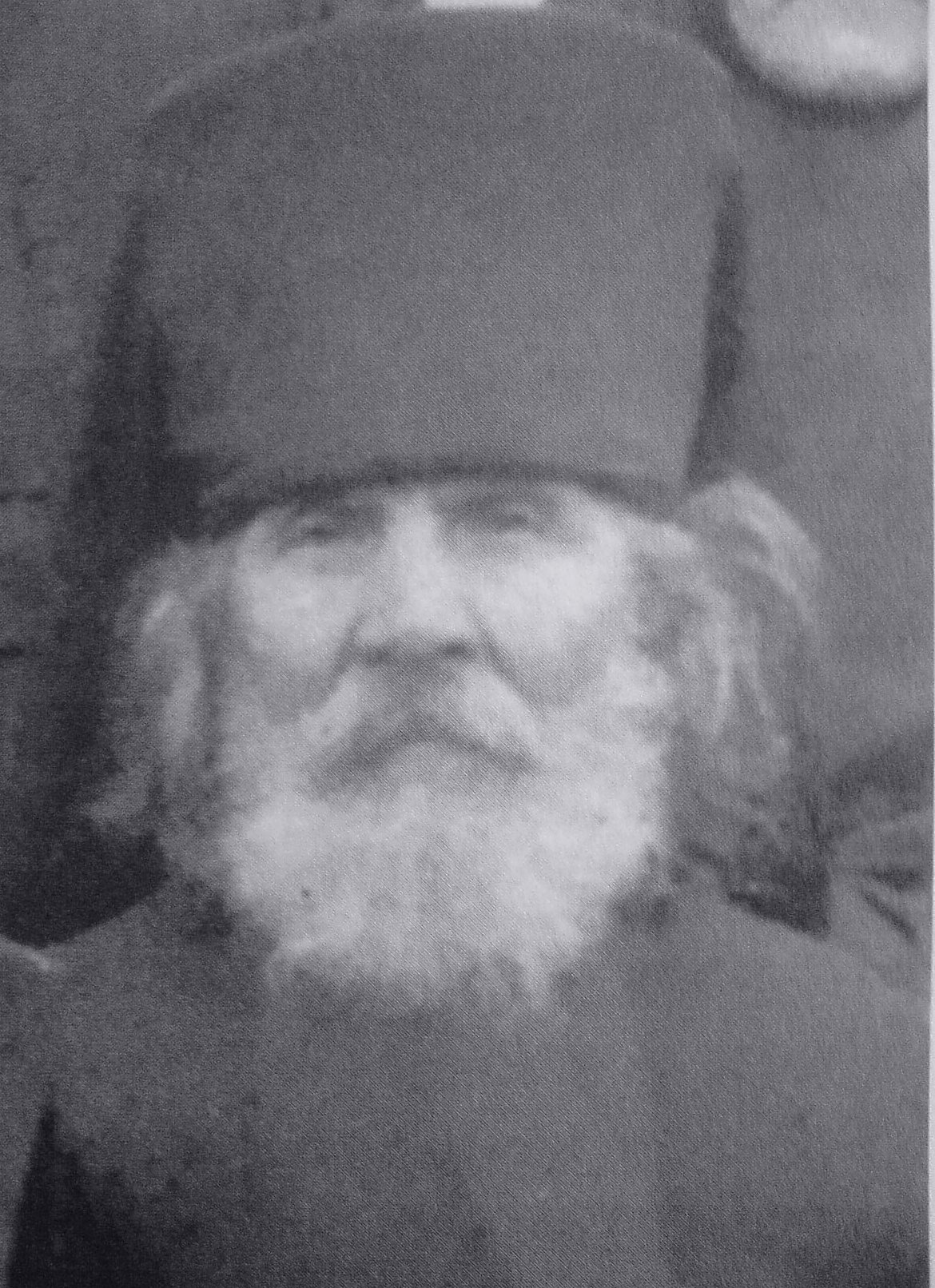
Monk Ignatius Bazyluk, a victim of the German assault on the monastery in June 1942. In 2003, he was canonized as one of the Chełm and Podlasie martyrs. His relics are kept in the monastery

After the Nazi aggression on Poland in 1939, the monastery in Jabłeczna fell within the borders of the General Government. The Bug river served as the border between the General Government and the Soviet Union until 1941, so a German military guardhouse was stationed on the monastery grounds. During the night of August 9–10, 1942, the Germans set fire to the main monastery buildings, destroyed the furnishings of the church, the library, and the archives, and murdered Monk Ignatius Bazyluk. After this event, most of the monks, except for the oldest, were directed by church authorities to pastoral work in the still-active parishes in the region. In 1945, the monastery was attacked by a Polish underground unit.

As a result of the deportations of the Ukrainian population to the USSR, and later the Operation Vistula, the number of Orthodox Ukrainians living in the Chełm region decreased almost to zero. Consequently, most of the parishes of the Polish Orthodox Church in the region were also liquidated. Bishop Timothy (Szretter), who agreed with this decision of the Polish Committee of National Liberation, managed the Orthodox structures in the Lublin Voivodeship and requested not to close the monastery in Jabłeczna. Up to that point, five monks had managed to return to the monastery. On 10 August 1946, Father Włodzimierz Wieżański arrived from Warsaw, appealing to the local population for help in rebuilding and maintaining the monastery. Ultimately, Bishop Timothy's request was fulfilled, although the opposite scenario was also considered. However, the monastery lost all its remaining land in 1950 (to the Koroszczyn State Agricultural Farm) and its inventory, thereby losing its economic basis for functioning. In 1951, it only had an orchard and a garden; the remaining fragment of arable land was so small that the State Agricultural Farm had to help feed the monks, having taken over most of its land. Until the 1970s, there were three monks in the monastery, and a dozen people attended services at the parish church. By the late 1950s, after Archimandrite Eulogius Horbowiec took over as acting superior of the monastery, the provisional reconstruction of the buildings after the war damage was completed. In 1953, the monastery was returned the icons of St. Onuphrius and the Jabłeczna Icon of the Mother of God taken away in 1915. The development of the community, or even its reconstruction in its pre-war form, was impossible because there were no new candidates applying to the monastery, and the other monks were elderly. Additionally, in 1955, the acting superior, Hegumen (later Archimandrite) Eulogius, complained about the low moral standards of the monks, including cases of alcoholism. These allegations were confirmed by a metropolitan commission appointed to inspect the monastery. In 1957, the insufficient number of monks living in the monastery did not even allow for the performance of a full cycle of daily services.

In 1962, the monastery was inhabited by three monks and three lay workers. The total income of the monastery amounted to 59,197 złotys, and expenses were 57,000 złotys. Despite all the problems, the monastery maintained prestige among the Orthodox faithful in Poland.

=== 1970–1989 ===
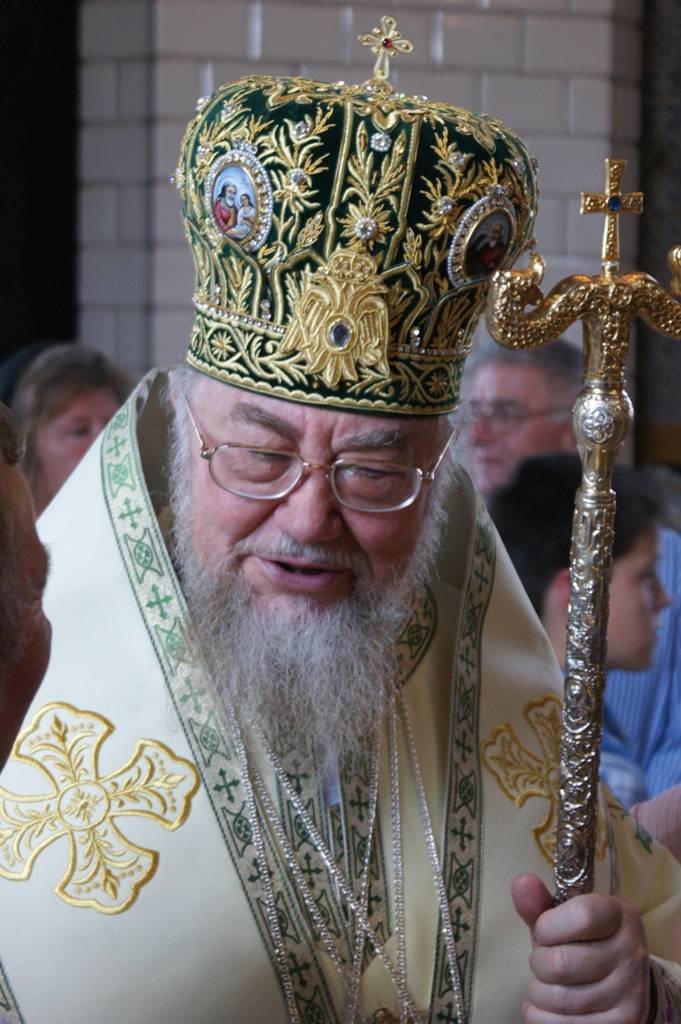
Sawa Hrycuniak, later Metropolitan of Warsaw and All Poland, significantly contributed to the revival of monastic life in Jabłeczna

On 8 February 1970, Archimandrite Sawa Hrycuniak became the abbot of the monastery. He completed renovation works in the monastery and then facilitated the relocation of the higher classes of the Orthodox Theological Seminary in Warsaw, which operated in the monastery from 1974 to 1992. The period of Archimandrite Sawa's administration marked a time of actual revival for the community. In the 1980s, the monastery complex was expanded with an additional wing. During this period, the monastery once again became a pilgrimage center.

From 1984 to 1987, only one monk resided in the monastery.

In 1989, the Orthodox Diocese of Lublin and Chełm was established. For two years, its headquarters was located in the Jabłeczna monastery.

=== Modern times ===
On the night of September 21–22, 1990, the monastery was robbed of the icon of St. Onuphrius and the Jabłeczna Icon of the Mother of God. The monastery regained them in August 1994 after paying a ransom of $10,000. The images were again placed in the monastery church on September 4 and 5, 1994, and to commemorate this event, a local holiday of the recovery of the icons of St. Onuphrius and the Mother of God was established, celebrated on the first Sunday of September. In the same year, a diocesan museum was established in the monastery. The monks run a farm, beekeeping, and produce church candles.

In 1995, the monastery housed 15 monks. Four years later, it obtained the status of stauropegion and came under the direct administration of the metropolitans of Warsaw and all Poland.

In 2016, a thorough renovation of the domestic church of St. John the Theologian was carried out. After the completion of the work, the temple was consecrated on 18 September 2016 by Metropolitan Sawa.

In 2022, there were six monks living in the monastery.

The goals of the community's activities are formulated as follows:

Prayer and work, meditation, and maintaining and strengthening the Orthodox faith in the Podlasie region.

== Superiors of the monastery ==
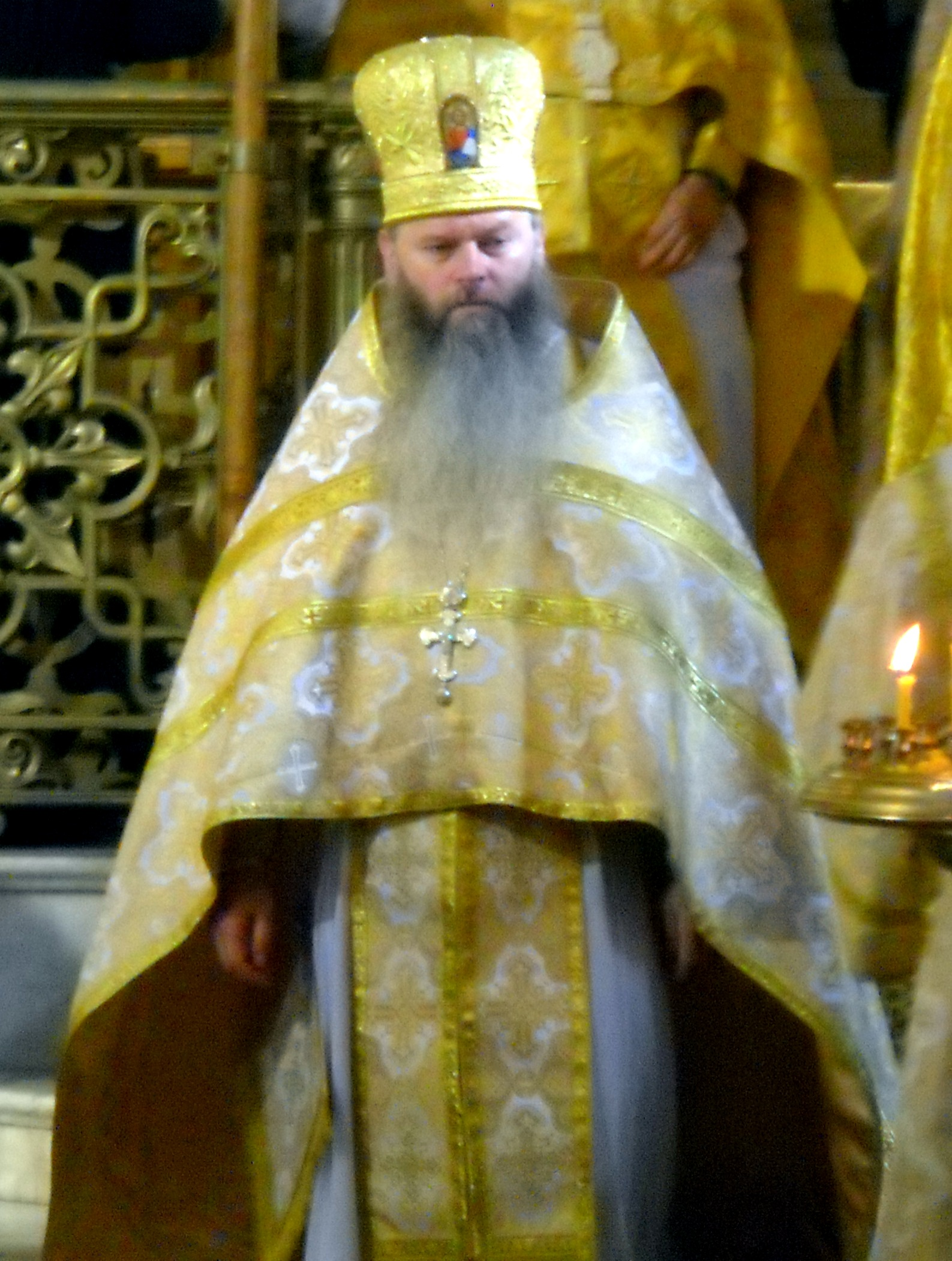
Atanazy Nos, superior of the monastery from 2007 to 2017, currently bishop of Łódź and Poznań

Due to the incomplete preservation of the monastery's archive, not all the personal details of the superiors of the Jabłeczna monastery are known. The first known superior of the community by name was Cyril (Mancewicz), who held office in 1527. The next leader of the monastery, Hegumen Kasjan, is mentioned in 1591. Exact dates of office are known for the clergy directing the monastery after 1747.

The superiors of the Jabłeczna monastery before 1832 usually held the title of hegumen (except for the monk Jan, who temporarily came from Kyiv in 1770). From the mentioned year, when Joannicjusz (Mosakowski) became the superior, until World War II, they typically received the title of archimandrite. After World War II, due to material and personnel difficulties of the monastery, it was managed by acting superiors until 1955, one of whom, Father Mikołaj Smolski, was a widowed priest without monastic vows.

Since the monastery was granted the status of stauropegion, its titular head has always been the Metropolitan of Warsaw and All Poland, who appoints a deputy to effectively lead the community. From 15 October 2019, this role has been filled by Hieromonk, later Hegumen, then Archimandrite Peter (Dawidziuk).

== Architecture ==
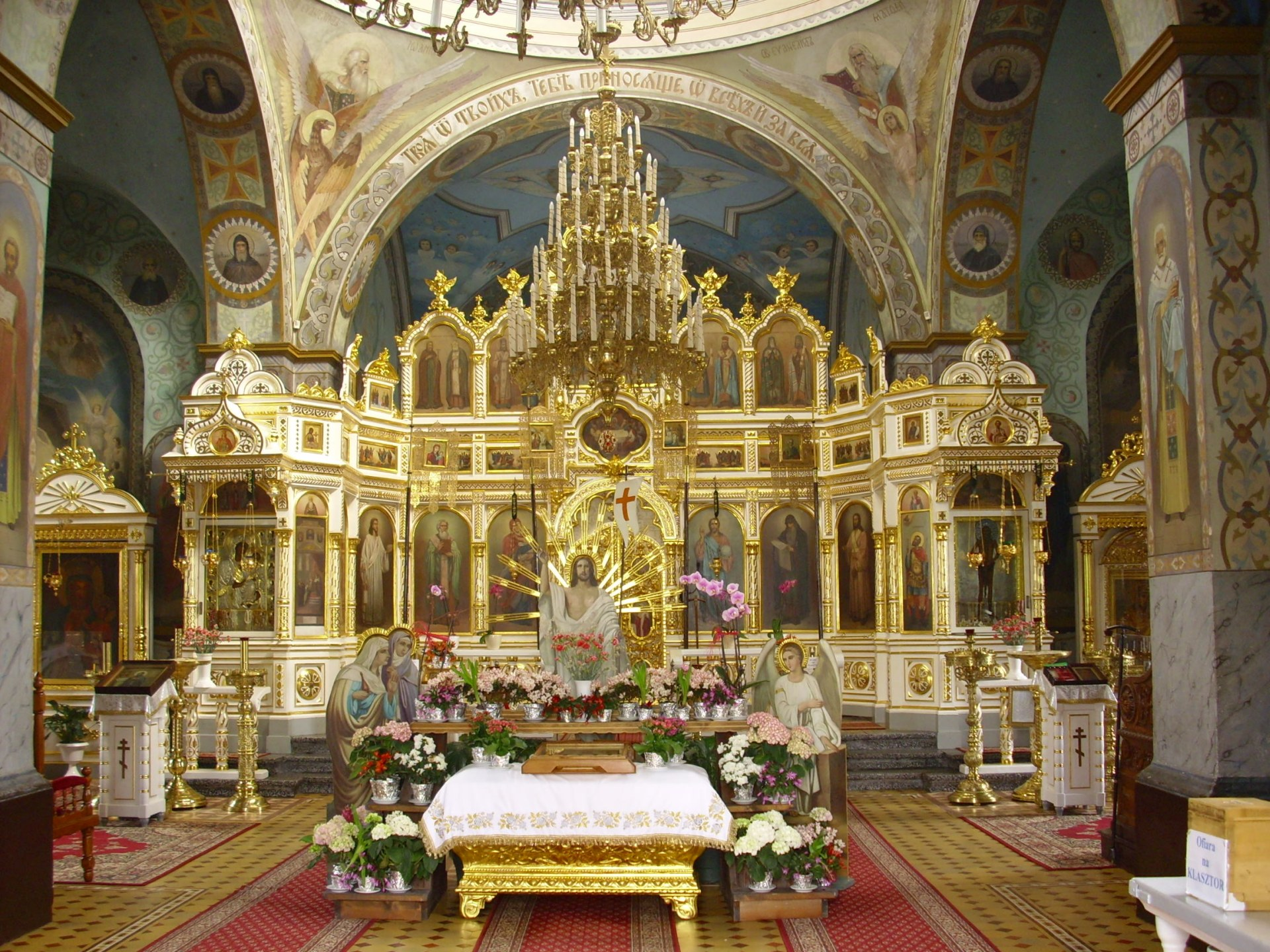
The interior of the church of St. Onuphrius in the monastery complex. The last icon in the bottom row on the right is considered to be the miraculous image of St. Onuphrius, the last one on the left – the Jabłeczna Icon of the Mother of God

The main monastery church is dedicated to St. Onuphrius. It was built in the years 1838–1840 in the shape of a Greek cross. This structure consists of three parts: a church porch, a nave, and a chancel, with a single dome supported by four piers. The interior of the building is adorned with a series of frescoes, and it also houses a three-tier iconostasis by Vasiliy Lojka and Feliks Skulimowski. At the entrance to the church from the left wing, there is the tomb of one of the superiors of the monastery, Archimandrite Narcissus (Silwiestrow).

Adjacent to the church is the bell tower.

During the winter months, the role of the main monastery temple is taken over by the domestic church of St. John the Theologian, located in one of the brick buildings of the monastery. It contains a single-tier iconostasis from the early 20th century. The interior of this church is decorated with polychrome paintings executed in 2016 by Natalia Oniśko from Białystok. Additionally, the chapel of St. Athanasius of Brest is located in the renovated refectory building.

Outside the monastery wall, there are two wooden chapels from the early 20th century: the Dormition of the Most Holy Mother of God and the Holy Spirit. The former is built in a rectangular plan, while the latter is in the shape of a cross; both are covered with sheet metal and topped with onion domes (the former has five, the latter one). Under the roof of the chapels, there is only the sanctuary space – during services, the faithful gather outside, facing the buildings. The chapel of the Dormition of the Mother of God houses a single-tier iconostasis made in Moscow, and the rest of the church's furnishings consist of 12 icons.

The monastery complex in Jabłeczna was entered into the heritage registers on 12 March 1966 (again on 18 August 1972, and 19 April 1985) under number A/14. On 2 February 2023, it was included in the list of historic monuments.

== Icons ==
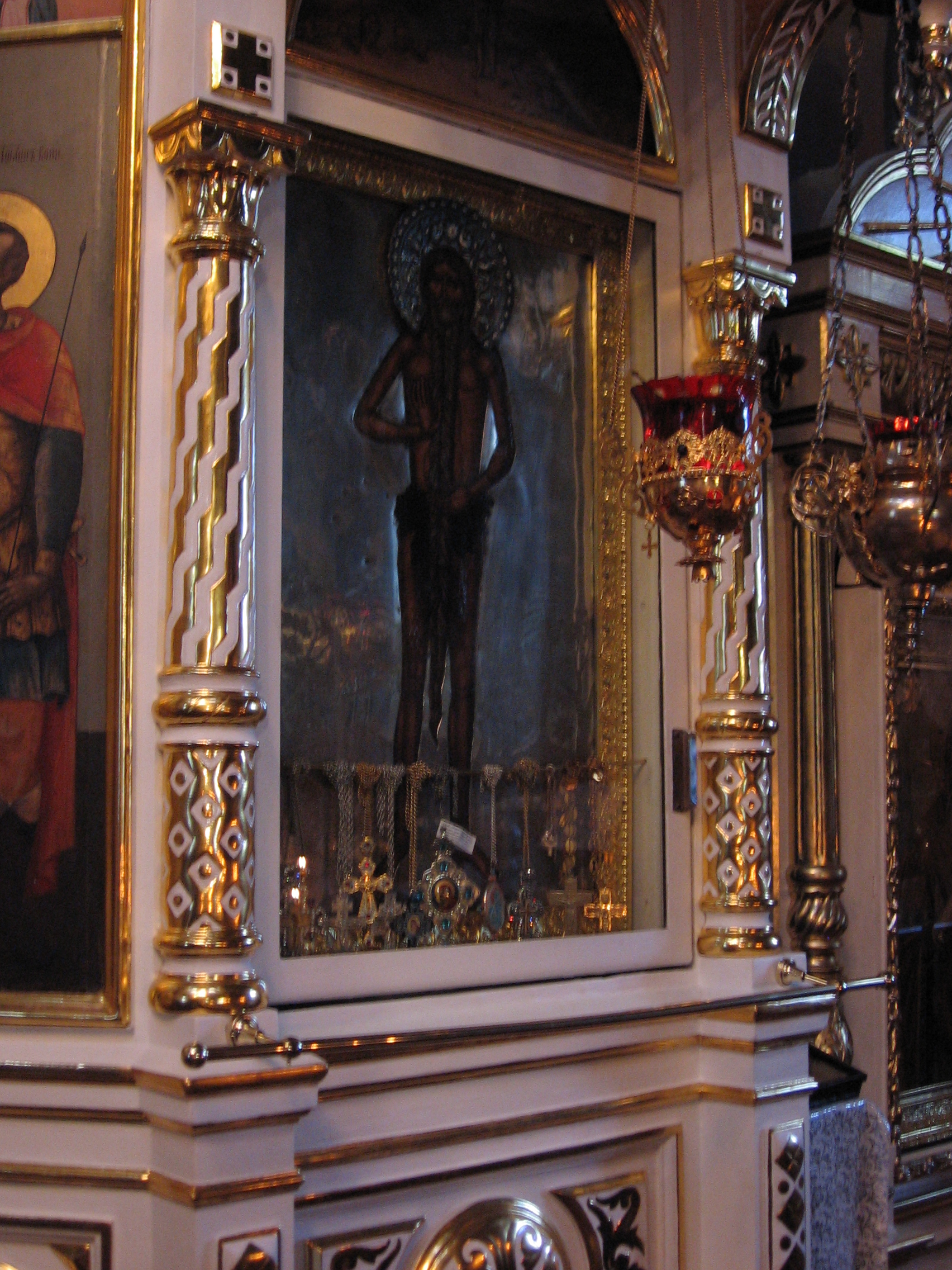
Icon of St. Onuphrius

Particularly revered among the Orthodox faithful in Poland are the Jabłeczna Icon of the Mother of God and the icon of St. Onuphrius, kept in the iconostasis of the main church. The image of the monastery's patron saint, according to art historians, dates back to between the 12th and 13th centuries. It was painted on a cypress wood panel with a chalk underlay. St. Onuphrius is depicted standing, wearing only a loincloth, with a gray beard reaching below the knees. In the background, the outline of the landscape along the Bug river can be seen. The dimensions of the icon are 112 by 75 cm.

The Jabłeczna Icon of the Mother of God is also dated to the 12th–13th centuries. It portrays Mary with the Child Jesus held in her left hand, while her right hand points to Him. Beside them are the figures of the archangels Gabriel and Michael. The frame of the icon is formed by the figures of Old Testament prophets foretelling the coming of the Savior. Therefore, this image is also known as the Fulfillment of Prophetic Predictions.

From 1990 to 2010, a copy of the Turkowice Icon of the Mother of God, considered miraculous, was kept in the monastery. In 2010, it was transferred to the female monastery in Turkowice.

== Bibliography ==
- Jadczak, Stanisław; Zugaj, Zbigniew (1992). Monaster w Jabłecznej. Sanktuarium polskiego prawosławia (in Polish). Lublin: Laser-Graf. OCLC 805126912.
- Kuprianowicz, G.; Leśniewski, K. (1995). Monaster św. Onufrego w Jabłecznej (in Polish). Jabłeczna: Prawosławna Diecezja Lubelsko-Chełmska. ISBN 83-901221-2-X. OCLC 749625167.
- Pawluczuk, U. A. (2007). Życie monastyczne w II Rzeczypospolitej (in Polish). Białystok: Wydawnictwo Uniwersytetu w Białymstoku. ISBN 978-83-7431-127-4. OCLC 174143139.
- Żeleźniakowicz, Serafim (2006). Istorija Jabłoczinskogo Swiato-Onufrijewskogo Monastyria (in Polish). Vol. I, II, III. Warsaw: Warszawska Metropolia Prawosławna. ISBN 978-83-60311-03-5.
