= Jabłeczna =

- Village
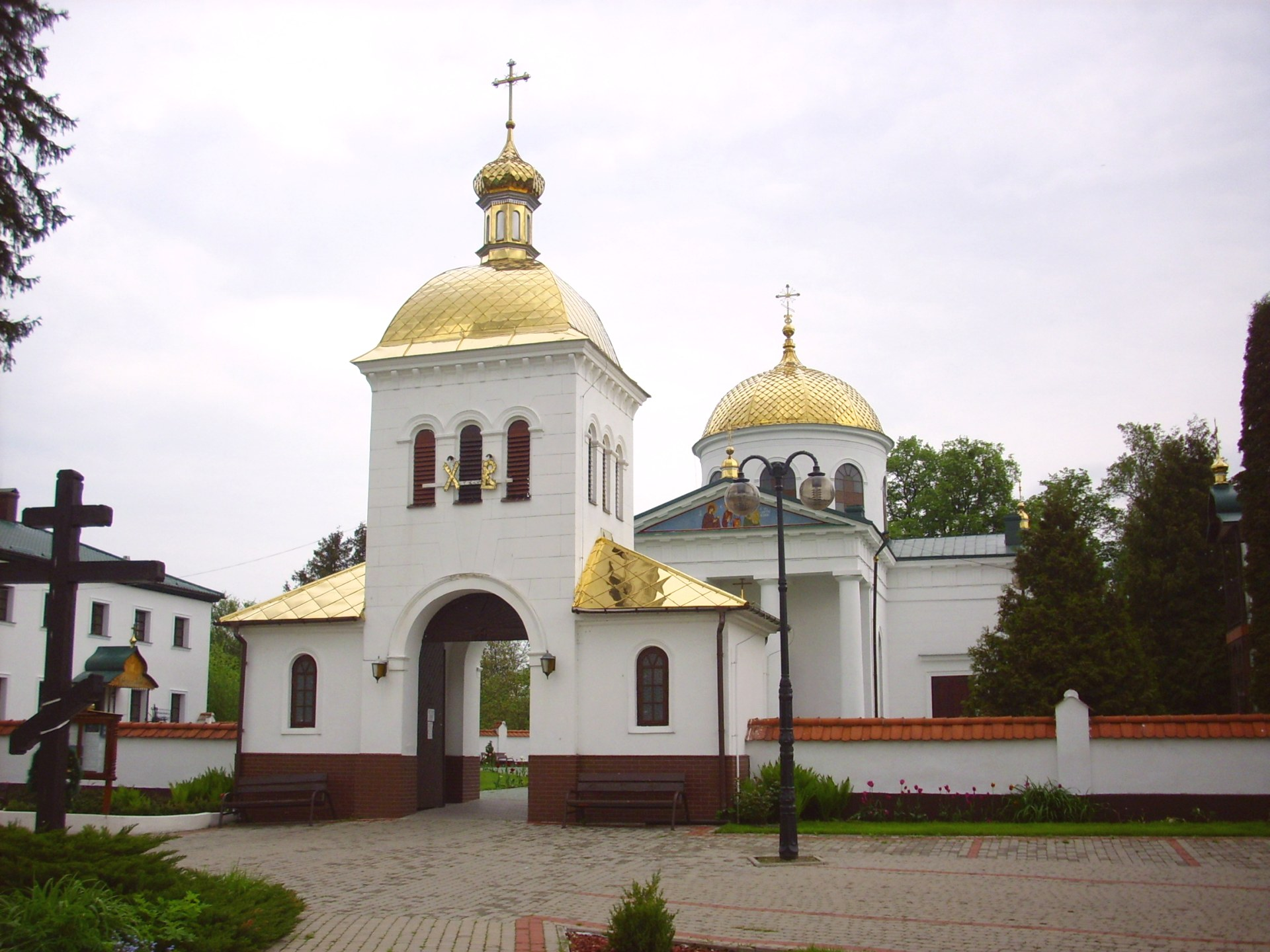
- The orthodox monastery and church complex in Jabłeczna

- Location within Poland
- Coordinates: 51°48′N 23°36′E
- Country: Poland
- Voivodeship: Lublin
- County: Biała
- Gmina: Sławatycze

Population (approx.)
  - Total: 320

Jabłeczna [jaˈbwɛt͡ʂna] is a village in the administrative district of Gmina Sławatycze, within Biała County, Lublin Voivodeship, in eastern Poland, close to the border with Belarus.
