= Martyrs of Pratulin =

Ukrainian Greek Martyrs

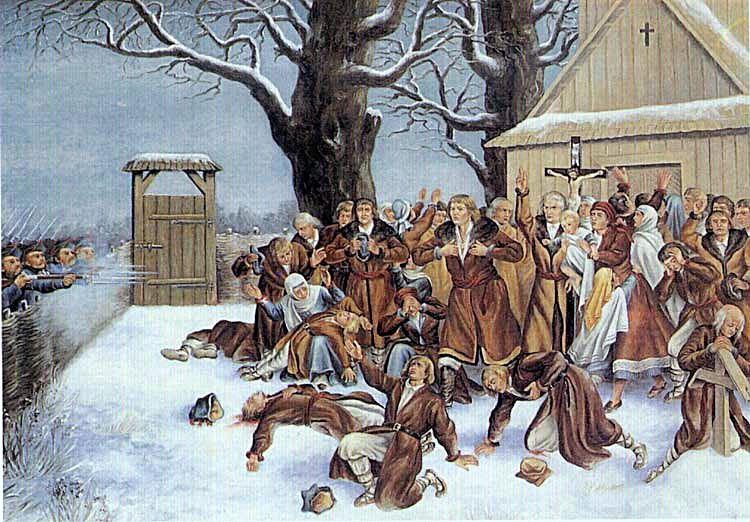
- Martyrs of Pratulin painted by Walery Eljasz Radzikowski, circa 1874

Laymen and Martyrs
- Born: between 1824 - 1855 various
- Died: 24 - 27 January 1874 (aged between 19 and 50) in the village of Pratulin, near Biała Podlaska.
- Venerated in: Roman Catholic Church; Eastern Catholic Churches
- Beatified: October 6, 1996, St. Peter's Square by Pope John Paul II
- Major shrine: St. Nikita Byzantine Catholic Church, Kostomłoty, Poland
- Feast: January 23
- Attributes: crucifix, martyr's palm, bible, defending a church
- Patronage: Lay Apostolate

The Martyrs of Pratulin (or Wincenty Lewoniuk and 12 Companion Martyrs of Pratulin) were a group of 13 Polish Greek Catholic men and boys who were killed by soldiers of the Imperial Russian Army on January 24, 1874, in the village of Pratulin, near Biała Podlaska.

== Historical Context ==
During the forced Conversion of Chelm Eparchy, the Russian authorities forcibly converted all Greek Catholics in Congress Poland and assigned their churches to the Russian Orthodox Church. In a protest against the Russification and confiscation of the church, the Greek Catholic community gathered in front of the church, but were fired upon by the Russian forces, killing 13 of the protesters. The Ruthenian Catholic Church has erected a shrine to their memory there.

== The Thirteen Martyrs ==
Died on 24 January during the shooting:

- Wincenty (Vincent) Lewoniuk, born in Woroblin, Janów Podlaski in 1849, married, aged 25. A pious man of good reputation. He was the first to give his life for the defense of the church and this deserved him to be placed at the head of this group.
- Daniel Karmasz, born in Łęgi, Terespol on 22 December 1826, married, aged 48. From the testimony of his son, we know that he was a man of religious sentiments and God-fearing. President of the parish brotherhood, during the defense of the church he stood at the head of the people carrying a cross that is still kept in Pratulin today.
- Łukasz (Luke) Bojko, born in Zaczopki, Rokitno on 29 October 1852, unmarried, aged 22. His brother testified that he was an honest man, religious and of good reputation. During the defense of the church he rang the bells.
- Konstanty (Constantine) Bojko, born in Derło, Rokitno on 25 August 1826, married, aged 48. Good and pious man. Seriously wounded defending the church, he died at home the next day, leaving his wife Irene and seven children.
- Anicet (Anicetus) Hryciuk, born in Zaczopki, Rokitno in 1855, unmarried, aged 19. Good young man, religious and educated in love towards the church. Leaving home with food for church defenders in Pratulin, he said to his mother: "Perhaps I too will be worthy to give my life for the faith." He was, in fact, killed at the church on January 24 in the afternoon hours.
- Filip (Philip) Geryluk, born in Zaczopki, Rokitno on November 26, 1830, married, aged 44. From the testimony of his nephew, he turned out to be a good family man, pious and honest. At church he encouraged others to persevere and he himself gave his life for the faith.
- Onufry (Onuphrius) Wasyluk, born in Zaczopki, Rokitno on 29 October 1852, aged 21. Good Catholic and just man, respected by all.
- Bartlomiej (Bartholomew) Osypiuk, born in Bohukaly, Terespol on 3 September 1843, aged 30. Married to Natalia, he had two children. Respected by everyone in the village for his honesty, shrewdness and piety. Badly wounded, he was carried home, where he died praying for his persecutors.
- Ignacy (Ignatius) Franczuk, born in Derło, Rokitno in 1824, aged 50. He married Elena with whom he had seven children. From his son, we know that he educated his children in the fear of God. Fidelity to God was for him the most important value of him. Preparing to go to Pratulin to defend the church, he put on a clean suit stating that anything could happen, even if he never returned. After the death of Daniel Karmasz he took up his cross and stood in the front row with the defenders.
- Jan (John) Andrzejuk, born in Derło, Rokitno on 9 April 1848, aged 26. He married Marina with whom he had two children. Esteemed by all as a good and prudent man. While he set out for Pratulin to defend the church, he said goodbye to everyone assuming it could be the last time. Badly wounded he was carried home, where he died during the night.

Died on 26 January of injuries after the shooting:

- Konstanty (Constantine) Łukaszuk, born in Zaczopki, Rokitno in 1829, married, aged 45. He was wounded in the defense of the church and this meant his death.

Died on 27 January of injuries after the shooting:

- Maksym (Maximus) Hawryluk, born in Bohukaly, Terespol on 2 May 1840, aged 34. Married to Domenica, esteemed by the people as a good and honest man.
- Michał (Michael) Wawryszuk, born in Derło, Rokitno in 1853, unmarried, aged 21. He worked on Paolo Pikula's estate in Derło. He enjoyed a good reputation.

== Beatification ==
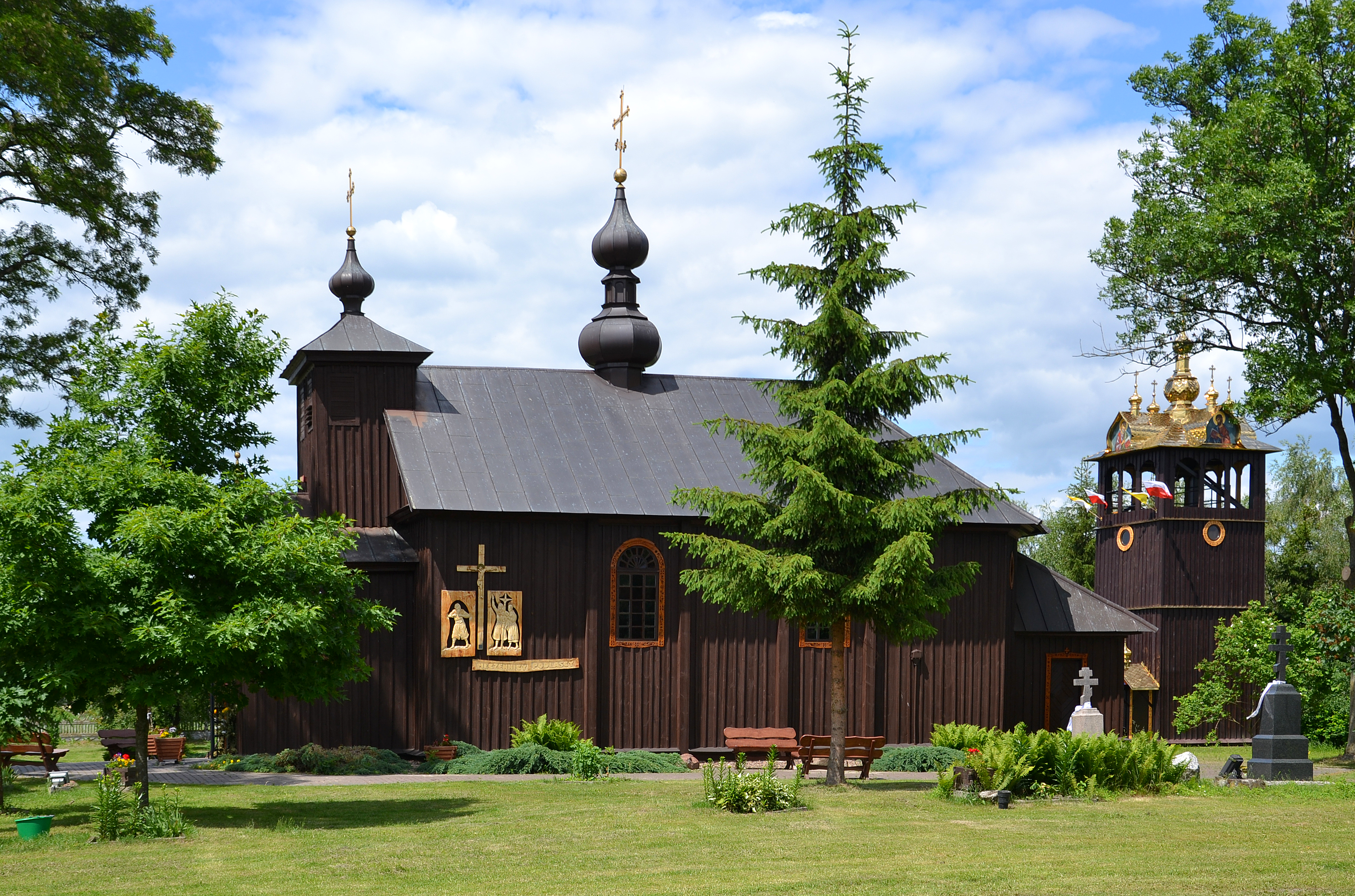
Pilgrimage Shrine of the Martyrs of Pratulin, Kostomłoty, Third Polish Republic.

The massacre at Pratulin remains the best documented of the events that took place in the region of South Podlasie, and thus, to also represent the other martyrs of the region who gave their lives for the independence of the Church from control by the State, the Latin Diocese of Siedlce chose to submit their cause for beatification in 1938. The 13 Martyrs were beatified by Pope John Paul II on October 6, 1996. In 1998, some of their relics were transferred to the Byzantine-Slavonic Rite church in nearby Kostomłoty, where the Shrine of the Martyrs of Pratulin was established.
