= Podolanka =

Podolanka may refer to:

- Podolanka, Czech Republic
- Podolanka, Poland
- Podolanka (book), 1784 novel by Michał Dymitr Krajewski
