= Zuki =

Żuki may refer to:

== Places in Poland ==
- Żuki, Gmina Terespol in Biała County, Lublin Voivodeship (east Poland)
- Żuki, Gmina Tuczna in Biała County, Lublin Voivodeship (east Poland)
- Żuki, Gmina Tykocin in Białystok County, Podlaskie Voivodeship (north-east Poland)
- Żuki, Gmina Zabłudów in Białystok County, Podlaskie Voivodeship (north-east Poland)
- Żuki, Gmina Kleszczele in Hajnówka County, Podlaskie Voivodeship (north-east Poland)
- Żuki, Gmina Sokółka in Sokółka County, Podlaskie Voivodeship (north-east Poland)
- Żuki, Masovian Voivodeship (east-central Poland)
- Żuki, Greater Poland Voivodeship (west-central Poland)

== People ==
- Mohd Zuki Ali (born 1962), 15th Chief Secretary to the Government of Malaysia
- Zuki Lee (born 1977), Hong Kong actress
- Sho Tsukioka, nicknamed "Zuki", a character in the Japanese novel Battle Royale

== See also ==
- Tsuki, term for thrusting techniques in Japanese martial arts, often spelled zuki in compound words
