= Gmina Rokitno =

Gmina Rokitno Rokitno Commune
- Gmina
- Coat of arms
- Interactive map of Gmina Rokitno
- Coordinates (Rokitno): 52°7′N 23°17′E
- Country: Poland
- Voivodeship: Lublin
- County: Biała County
- Seat: Rokitno

Area
  - Total: 140.82 km^{2} (54.37 sq mi)

Population (2014)
  - Total: 3,097
  - Density: 21.99/km^{2} (56.96/sq mi)
- Website: http://www.rokitno.pl

Gmina Rokitno is a rural gmina (administrative district) in Biała County, Lublin Voivodeship, in eastern Poland on the border with Belarus. Its seat is the village of Rokitno which lies approximately 15 kilometres (9 mi) north-east of Biała Podlaska and 109 km (68 mi) north-east of the regional capital Lublin.

The gmina covers an area of 140.82 square kilometres (54.4 sq mi) and its total population was 3,315 in 2006 (3,097 in 2014).

The gmina contains part of the protected area called Podlasie Bug Gorge Landscape Park.

== Villages ==
Gmina Rokitno contains the villages and settlements of Cieleśnica, Cieleśnica PGR, Derło, Hołodnica, Klonownica Duża, Kołczyn, Kołczyn-Kolonia, Lipnica, Michałki, Michałki-Kolonia, Olszyn, Pokinianka, Pratulin, Rokitno, Rokitno-Kolonia, Zaczopki and Zaczopki-Kolonia.

== Neighbouring gminas ==
Gmina Rokitno is bordered by the gminas of Biała Podlaska, Janów Podlaski, Terespol and Zalesie. It also borders Belarus.
