= Conversion of Chełm Eparchy =

1875 forced conversion of the Eparchy of Chełm–Belz

The Conversion of Chełm Eparchy was the forced conversion of the Eparchy of Chełm–Belz that took place between January and May 1875. It was the last eparchy of the Ruthenian Uniate Church that remained on the territory of the Russian Empire following the partitions of Poland. The episcopal seat of the eparchy was in the city of Chełm (Kholm) in Congress Poland. Adherents and clergy were forced to join the Russian Orthodox Church.

== Background ==
In 988 East Slavic state of Kievan Rus' was converted to the Eastern form of Christianity by Vladimir I of Kiev. Following the East-West Schism between the Roman and Byzantine Churches, the form of Christianity that Kievan Rus followed became known as Eastern Orthodox Church. In 1241, Kievan Rus was conquered by the Mongols. Over the centuries, the parts of Rus that would one day become northern Ukraine and Belarus were absorbed by Poland. Within the mostly Roman Catholic Polish state, the appointment of Orthodox bishops by the Polish kings tended to favor lay members of the Ruthenian nobility, often with extremely disastrous results. Meanwhile, the elevation of the Metropolitan See of Moscow to a Patriarchate in 1588 enraged many Orthodox Ukrainians, who saw the move as an insult to the seniority of the See of Kyiv. Meanwhile, the religious and cultural revival caused by the Counter-Reformation in Poland drew admiration from many Orthodox priests, who began to consider a transfer of allegiance from the Ottoman-controlled Patriarch of Constantinople to the Pope of Rome. Between 1595-1596, the Union of Brest saw the creation of the Ukrainian Greek Catholic Church and the 1636 Union of Uzhhorod similarly created the Ruthenian Greek Catholic Church in Ruthenian Transcarpathia. Like all the other Eastern Catholic Churches, the Ruthenian and Ukrainian Churches maintain the liturgical, theological and devotional traditions of the Christian East while in communion with the Holy See and the Latin Church.

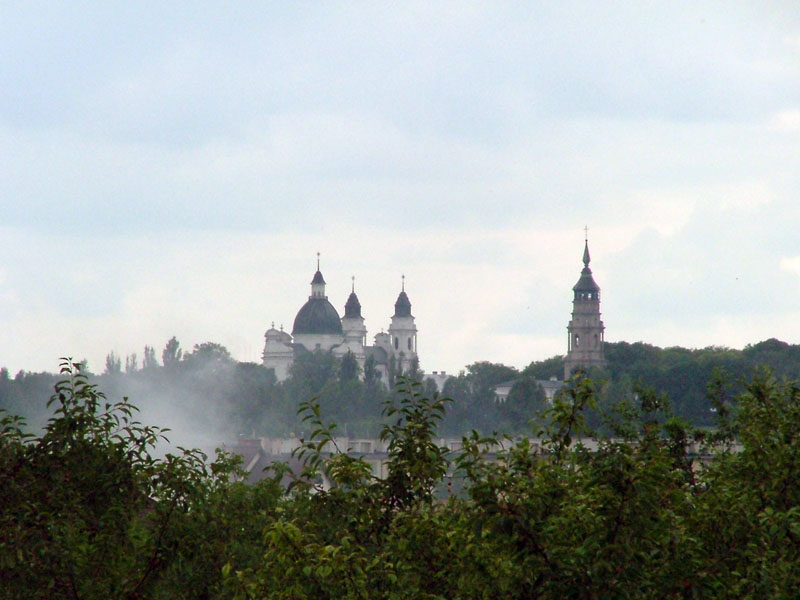
The former Greek Catholic Cathedral on Cathedral Hill in Chełm (currently in the Third Polish Republic).

As the Russian Empire gained the territories along its western frontier through a series of wars and Partitions of Poland that lasted from the seventeenth through the end of the eighteenth centuries, the Greek Catholic Church was deliberately incorporated into the State-controlled Russian Orthodox Church. In 1839, as part of the Tsarist crackdown following the defeat of the November Uprising of 1831, membership in the Eastern Catholic Churches outside Congress Poland was criminalized outright by the Synod of Polotsk. However, this was yet to affect the Eparchy of Chełm.

The longevity of Byzantine Catholicism in this region was attributed to several factors. The eparchy's territory came under Russian control later than did any other Greek Catholic territories ultimately absorbed by Russia (1815 unlike 1795). During the Third Partition of Poland in 1795, it was granted to Austria. Only two decades later, after the Russian victory in the Napoleonic Wars did it become part of Russia. Also, unlike other Greek Catholic regions within the Russian Empire, it had been part of the autonomous Congress Poland. Another factor affecting the Greek Catholic Church's longevity was its deep roots in the local population, which was deeply intermixed between Poles and Ukrainians. Both ethnic groups in the Chełm region viewed the Russian authorities as a mutual enemy. Furthermore, Liturgical Latinisations such as the singing of Polish-language hymns, the playing of organ music, and the reciting of the rosary within the Byzantine Rite were widely considered a matter of national pride, and all attempts to curtail their use were widely ignored.

In contrast to the Polonophilia of Chełm's Greek Catholic parishioners and clergy, during the mid-nineteenth century the Ukrainian Greek Catholic Church in neighboring Galicia was dominated by anti-Polish and pro-Slavophile Ukrainian Russophiles Galician Greek Catholic priests with Tsarist sympathies were routinely recruited by spymasters under Russian Foreign Office cover in Vienna or by Yakiv Holovatsky, the Russophile president of the University, in Lviv. They also often accepted posts in Chełm because the Russian government paid them much higher salaries than they could ever hope to expect in the Austro-Hungarian Empire. These Pro-Tsarist clergymen were often intensely disliked by the population of Chełm, and petitions by the laity to the last Greek Catholic Bishop often referred to them as, "Galician wolves". These Russophile Galician priests would play a major role in the forced conversion of the Chełm Eparchy.

== Conversion ==
By the end of the 1860s, political circumstances had changed. Following the defeat of the 1865 January Uprising against Tsar Alexander II, all the remaining autonomy of Congress Poland was abolished. After having struggled with Tsarist authorities, Greek Catholic Bishop Mikhail Kuzemsky issued a letter of resignation and left Chełm. Even though the Bishop's resignation was rejected by the Vatican, the Russian authorities immediately appointed a Galician Russophile priest, Fr. Markell Popel, who was living in open concubinage, as Exarch of the eparchy.

Forced conversion to Orthodoxy was preceded by the "purification" the Chełm eparchy of all Latin rituals from the Divine Liturgy, ordered by Popel in October 1873. Initially, it was ignored by many priests, until the Russian state ordered them to sign a declaration that they would abide by the new rules by the New Year of 1874. Over twenty priests refused, and were either arrested or escaped to Galicia. Resistance to the changes was widespread among the Laity, particularly in the northern areas of the eparchy. In numerous parishes, the priests attempting to implement the reforms were dragged out of the church or their belongings were packed outside the rectory. Russian police Constables and Cossacks were used to force the parishioners to accept the de-Latinised Rites; and parishioners who refused to agree were routinely beaten or shot. The struggle has often been compared to that of the Old Believer schism of 1666, and at least one case of self-immolation has been recorded.

The "purification" having been completed by the end of 1874, from January and May 1875, all of the parishes officially proclaimed their union with the Orthodox Church. The Eparchy was dissolved and incorporated into the newly created Orthodox eparchy of Chełm and Warsaw, with Bishop Popel becoming suffragan bishop of Lublin residence in Chełm. During the struggle over purification and forced conversion, a total of 600 faithful were deported to Siberia and 108 lost their lives. Sixty-six native Chełm priests who refused to convert to Orthodoxy fled to Galicia, 74 were exiled to Siberia or imprisoned, and seven died as martyrs. Chełm eparchy was purged in the process of most of its native priests, who were replaced by anti-Polish and anti-Catholic Russophile priests recruited from eastern Galicia. In March 1881, out of 291 Orthodox priests in the former eparchy, only 95 were native Chełm priests who had converted, 53 were Orthodox priests assigned to the eparchy from elsewhere, and 143 were Galician Russophiles.

== Aftermath ==
In Galicia, the forced conversion of Chełm was met with support on the part of the Russophiles and indifference among other segments of the Ukrainian Catholic Church. The Russophile priests at the time were very influential and succeeded in preventing many refugee priests from Russian Poland from obtaining positions in Galicia's Greek Catholic parishes.

Despite their opposition to Tsarism, Orthodoxy, and local Russophiles, many Galician Ukrainophiles were equally opposed to Liturgical Latinisations within the Byzantine Rite and felt contempt for those who wished to preserve them. Furthermore, as the Ruthenian nobility of Galicia had been completely Polonized for centuries and was widely disliked. Many Ukrainian intellectuals in Galicia were accordingly anti-Polish to such an extreme that they even looked down upon ethnic Poles who were fellow Byzantine Catholics experiencing both religious persecution and a policy of coercive Russification disturbingly similar to that imposed upon Tsarist ruled Ukrainians since the 1876 Ems Ukaz.

Meanwhile, the local unpopularity of the forced conversion was strong enough that, a generation later, following the religious toleration decree during the Russian Revolution of 1905 which finally allowed Orthodox Christians to legally convert to other religions, 170,000 out of the 450,000 Orthodox in the former Chełm Eparchy had returned to Catholicism by 1908, despite the Russian Government only grudgingly allowing conversion to Catholicism of the Roman Rite.

In 1912 the Imperial authorities created a new Kholm Governorate, split from Congress Poland, to facilitate the continued policy of coercive Russification and the religious conversion of the non-Eastern Orthodox population.

Following World War I, Chełm was incorporated into the Second Polish Republic. In a reversal, the Eastern Orthodox, Eastern Catholic, and non-Polish-speaking population were persecuted, under a policy of coercive Polonization of all minorities by the State. According to Tomaszewski and Gil some of the Ukrainians opposed the conversions and Polonization. After World War II, Chełm was retained by the Polish People's Republic and, by irony, today it is a strong centre for the non-Galician Ukrainian culture and the Polish Orthodox Church.

== Commemoration ==
In 1938, the Roman Catholic Diocese of Siedlce chose, following careful investigation, to submit a cause for the beatification of the Greek Catholic Pratulin Martyrs; 13 men and boys who were fatally shot by soldiers of the Imperial Russian Army on January 24, 1874, while nonviolently resisting the Orthodox confiscation of their parish church in the village of Pratulin, Biała Podlaska. All 13 were beatified by Pope John Paul II on October 6, 1996. In 1998, their relics were transferred to the Ruthenian Greek Catholic Church in nearby Kostomłoty, where the pilgrimage Shrine of the Martyrs of Pratulin has been established.

== See also ==
- Ukrainian Russophiles
