= Markell Popel =

Bishop of the Russian Orthodox Church of Ukrainian origin

- Bishop of Polotsk and Vitebsk
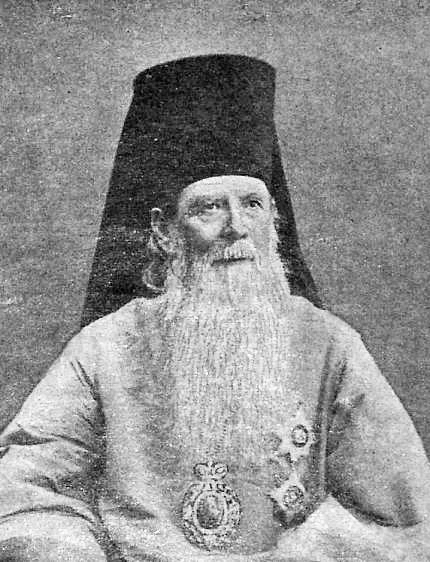
- Church: Russian Orthodox Church
- Installed: 1882
- Term ended: 1889

Orders
- Ordination: January 20, 1850
- Consecration: July 8, 1875

Personal details
- Born: December 31, 1821 or 1825 Halych or Medukha
- Died: September 29, 1903 Saint Petersburg
- Buried: Nikolskoe Cemetery
- Denomination: Eastern Orthodoxy

Markell Popel (born 31 December 1821 or 1825 in Halych or Medukha, died 29 September [O.S. 16 October] 1903 in Saint Petersburg) was a bishop of the Russian Orthodox Church of Ukrainian origin.

He was born into a Greek Catholic family. He completed studies in philosophy and Catholic theology and, after marrying, was ordained a priest in the Uniate rite in 1850. For a year, he engaged in pastoral work in the parish in Buchach, then from 1851 to 1859, he was a catechist at a gymnasium in Ternopil, and until 1866, a catechist at gymnasiums in Lviv. He published textbooks on liturgics and moral theology intended for Greek Catholic seminary students.

From 1854, he was active in the Russophile movement. He was also one of the leaders of the ritual movement in Galicia, which demanded the removal of all Latin elements from the Greek Catholic Church's liturgy. Initially, he only advocated for the purification of the Eastern rite within the Catholic Church, but over time, he came to believe that the Union of Brest had been a negative event for the Rus' people and that their original faith was Orthodoxy. Consequently, in 1866, he moved to Chełm Land, which was under Russian rule, to promote the purification of the Eastern rite from Latin influences. In this way, the Tsarist authorities intended to prepare for the complete abolition of the Union in the Russian Empire.

For his role in the liquidation of the last Uniate administrative unit in the Russian Empire, he was consecrated on 8 June 1875 as an auxiliary bishop of the Eparchy of Chełm and Warsaw with the title of Bishop of Lublin, maintaining personal oversight of the former Uniate parishes. In 1878, after a conflict with Archbishop Leontius of Chełm and Warsaw, he was transferred to the Podolia and Bratslav see, where he served as the ordinary until 1882. He was then the Bishop of Polotsk and Vitebsk from 1882 to 1889. In 1889, he retired but remained a member of the Most Holy Synod and participated in its work until his death in 1903. He died and was buried in Saint Petersburg.

== Early life ==
=== Youth and activities in Galicia ===
Markell Popel was born in Galicia as the son of nobleman Onuphry Popel. He was baptized in the Greek Catholic Church.

He completed a four-year German school in Halych, followed by classical gymnasiums in Stanyslaviv and Buchach. He continued his university studies in Chernivtsi (philosophy) and in Lviv and Vienna (theology). On 20 January 1850, he was ordained a priest and took over the parish in Buchach.

From 1851 to 1859, he was a catechist at a gymnasium in Ternopil. In the early years of his work, he did not show Russophile sympathies; he instructed his students to sing religious songs in German or Latin. However, by 1854, he had radically changed his views and joined a group of gymnasium teachers who, in cooperation with Yakiv Holovatsky, distributed Russophile publications among students. He later worked for three years as a Russian language teacher at an academic gymnasium in Lviv, and from 1862 to 1866, he was a catechist at a German gymnasium in Lviv. He authored the drama Nemira, printed by the magazine Halychka Zoria, and reflections on the bard Boyan, the hero of The Tale of Igor's Campaign. He also published articles on the current situation and identity of the Greek Catholic Church in Galicia.

Father Popel was one of the leaders of the ritual movement advocating for the removal of all Latin elements from the Uniate church's liturgy. He implemented such changes in his pastoral practice. In 1862, Greek Catholic Metropolitan of Lviv, Hryhoriy Yakhymovych, appointed him to a commission to coordinate efforts to purify the Eastern rite, to prevent further grassroots and unauthorized initiatives by parish clergy in the area. The sudden death of the hierarch prevented the commission's work, and his successor, Spyrydon Lytvynovych, significantly curtailed the movement. At this time, Father Popel was not yet an advocate of Orthodoxy. In 1857, he published a textbook on moral theology, and in 1863 he published in Lviv a textbook on liturgics for Greek Catholic seminary students, which included teachings on the primacy of the pope in accordance with Catholic doctrine.

According to Włodzimierz Osadczy:

Markell Popel should be considered an ideological seeker of the purity of the Eastern rite, who, although declaring loyalty and obedience to the pope, as they delved into the intricacies of Eastern church identity, came to the conviction of the Union's shortcomings and secretly leaned toward apostasy.

From 1864 to 1865, he edited the religious magazine Nedelja.

=== Activities in the Uniate Diocese of Chełm ===
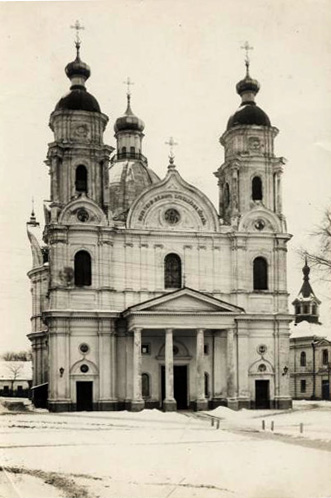
The Uniate Church of the Birth of the Virgin Mary in Chełm after the reconstruction in the 1870s in the Russian Revival style and adaptation to an Orthodox cathedral. Initially, Markell Popel served in this church as a Uniate priest, later as an Orthodox priest

In 1866, together with his sons, he left Galicia and permanently moved to Russia. His arrival in Chełm Land was related to the planned abolition of the Uniate Diocese of Chełm by the Russian authorities. According to the Russian administration, the liquidation of the last Uniate administrative unit in the Empire had to be preceded by the removal of Latin elements (deeply rooted in the diocese) from the liturgy, which was supposed to facilitate the complete Russification of the Rus' population of Chełm. These actions were to be carried out by Uniate clergy with Russophile views, who were to be recruited from among the participants of the ritual movement in Galicia.

According to Witold Kołbuk, Father Popel was one of the few clergy motivated to come to Chełm Land not by material considerations, but by sincere support for the idea of promoting Orthodoxy.

Father Markell Popel arrived in Chełm Land with a recommendation from Slavophile activist and chaplain of the church at the Russian embassy in Vienna, Father Mikhail Rajewski, as one of the first Galicians. In 1867, he began working as a catechist at a gymnasium in Chełm and as a lecturer at the Uniate seminary. He taught catechism, basics of church rites, and biblical history. He was also included among the clergy of the Uniate Church of the Birth of the Virgin Mary in Chełm and was granted the title of protopriest.

The Russian authorities, preparing for the final liquidation of the Uniate Church in the Empire, decided to entrust the administration of the Chełm diocese to a clergyman with Russophile views who would support the plans of the Tsarist administration. In 1868, Father Markell Popel was presented to the pope as a candidate for Bishop of Chełm, but the pope did not agree to his nomination. Eventually, Mykhailo Kuzemski became the Bishop of Chełm. From the beginning of the new ordinary's activity, Father Popel remained in conflict with him. Kuzemski negatively viewed the activities of the Galician clergy who had come to Chełm and were radically combating all Latin elements in the liturgy. In 1869, a conflict arose between Father Popel and the bishop over the former's boycott of the Feast of Corpus Christi. Father Popel was also involved in bringing more Galician Russophiles to Chełm Land. He enjoyed the complete trust of the Russian authorities, whose projects regarding the future of Chełm he carried out with dedication and commitment. Therefore, the Russian authorities unsuccessfully sought his appointment as auxiliary bishop of the Chełm diocese.

In 1869, he received Russian citizenship.

==== Administrator of the Chełm diocese ====
In 1871, Mykhailo Kuzemski resigned from the administration of the Chełm diocese. On 15 April 1871, the Tsar issued a decree appointing Father Markell Popel as the temporary administrator of the diocese. This nomination was poorly received by the clergy of the diocese, as well as by the Orthodox priests of the Eparchy of Chełm and Warsaw. They accused Father Popel of leading a dissolute lifestyle. Additionally, Pope Pius IX regarded the new administrator as a usurper. The pope still considered Mykhailo Kuzemski as the Bishop of Chełm and demanded from him a written condemnation of Father Popel's activities, which Kuzemski did not comply with.

Father Markell Popel continued to bring more priests from Galicia, personally issuing invitations for them. Such documents facilitated obtaining Russian visas and crossing the border. As the administrator of the diocese, he openly began preparing for the mass conversion of Chełm's Uniates to Orthodoxy. In April 1871, he issued a circular mandating the elimination of Latin elements from the Uniate liturgy. In December, he ordered the mandatory celebration of the feasts of St. Nicholas, St. John the Theologian, and St. John the Baptist while omitting the feasts of St. Josaphat, the Immaculate Conception of the Blessed Virgin Mary, and Corpus Christi. His decrees, combined with the anti-Unite policies of the Governor of Siedlce, Stepan Gromieko, caused unrest among some Uniates, leading to riots in parishes in Podlachia. As a result, in June 1872, Tsar Alexander II instructed the Ober-Procurator of the Most Holy Synod to establish a Special Committee for the Affairs of the Chełm Diocese to coordinate the actions of civil and ecclesiastical authorities in the region. Father Popel was appointed as one of its members. The committee drafted instructions for punitive measures against resistant parishes. The administrator of the Chełm diocese was instructed to assess the attitudes of the clergy towards the introduced changes and propose penalties for those opposed. He was also required to inform the faithful that the goal of purifying the rite was not to prepare for mass conversion but to restore the Uniate rite to its original form without Latin elements.

On 12 September 1872, Father Popel reported the results of his survey among the Uniate clergy, stating that 75 out of 262 priests were opposed to the revised liturgy, with another 45 considered uncertain. In October of the same year, the list of "uncertain and disloyal" clergymen in the Lublin Governorate included 47 names. Further actions of the administrator of the Chełm diocese were consulted in January 1873 with the governors of Lublin and Siedlce. It was decided to introduce within three months a liturgy entirely based on Russian models (the so-called Synodal Rite) in the Uniate parishes.

In October 1873, Father Popel issued a special circular ordering the removal of bells, monstrances, confessionals, and side altars from Uniate churches, the introduction of iconostases, the cessation of mentioning the pope, and the administration of Holy Communion only while standing. He supplied Uniate parishes with Orthodox liturgical books printed in Saint Petersburg. The feast of St. Josaphat Kuntsevych and Corpus Christi were removed from the list of holidays celebrated in the diocese. Entire church buildings were being rebuilt in the style typical of Russian ecclesiastical architecture. Due to resistance from the population to these actions, they were carried out with the support of Tsarist troops (significant protests occurred in 29 out of 266 parishes in the diocese). Those opposing the changes were repressed, imprisoned, and exiled to Siberia. In 1874, there were two instances of Russian military aggression against Uniate churches, resulting in fatalities in Pratulin and Drelów. During Father Popel's tenure as administrator, 74 Uniate priests with anti-Orthodox attitudes were exiled or interned, while another 66 fled from Chełm to Galicia.

In his sermons and seminary lectures, Father Popel, while officially remaining a Uniate, taught Orthodox theology. On 13 May 1874, Pope Pius IX condemned Father Popel's activities in the encyclical Omnem sollicitudinem. He declared the liturgical changes introduced by Popel as invalid and referred to him as the unfortunate pseudo-administrator.

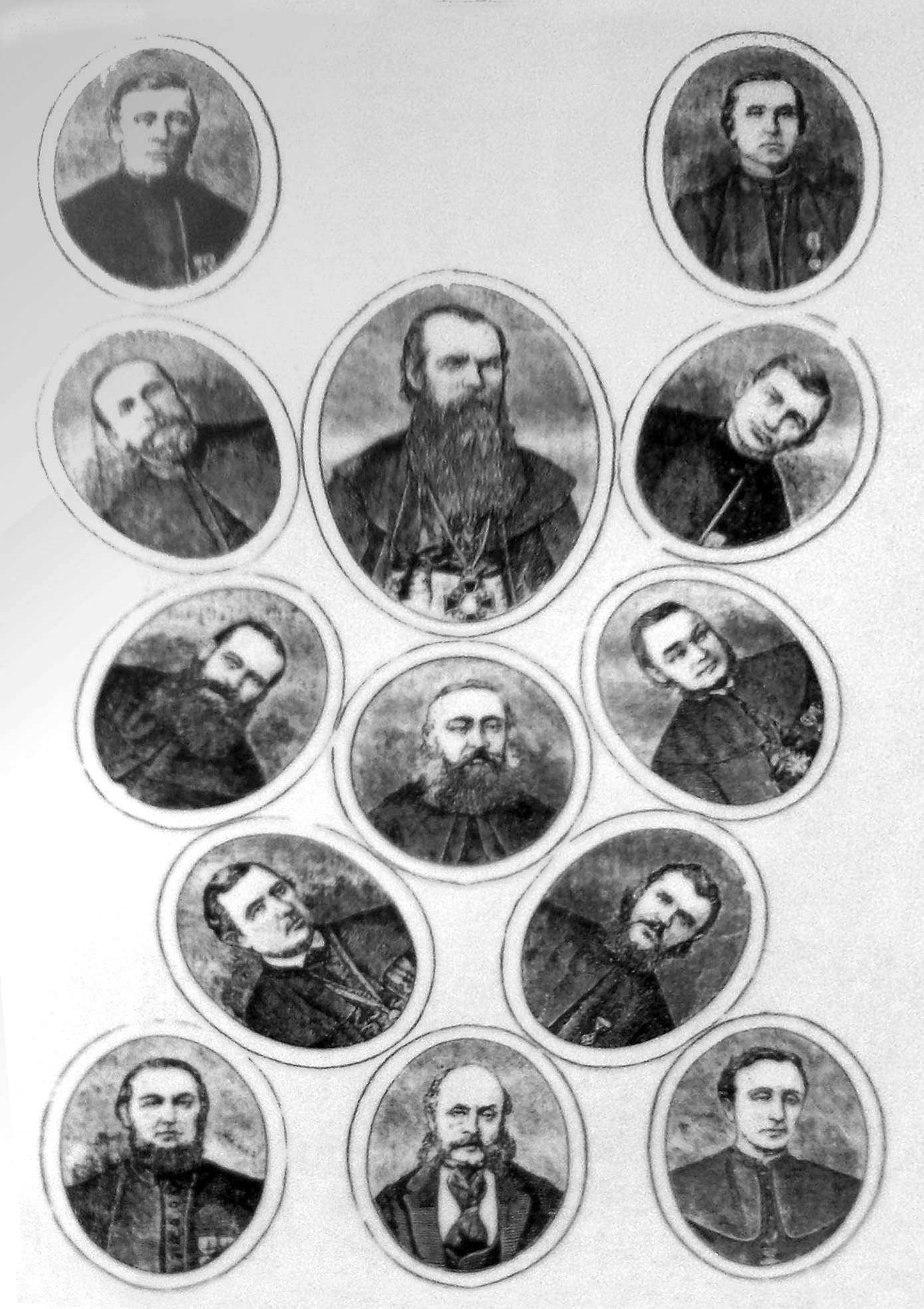
Signatories of the Act of the Chełm Cathedral Clergy. Father Markell Popel is visible in the largest image, in the center of the group

In February 1875, Father Markell Popel, along with other priests serving in the Uniate Cathedral in Chełm, sent a letter to Tsar Alexander II requesting permission to convert to Orthodoxy. This letter, titled the Act of the Chełm Cathedral Clergy, was presented to the Tsar on April 6 of the same year by a delegation that included the administrator of the diocese. The approval of the act and the subsequent decision of the Most Holy Synod on 23 May 1875 marked the dissolution of the Chełm diocese and the incorporation of its pastoral institutions into the Russian Orthodox Church. Following this decision, Father Popel converted along with the vast majority of the Galician clergy who had come to Chełm.

=== Bishop of Lublin ===
For his role in the dissolution of the Chełm diocese, Father Markell Popel was awarded the Order of Saint Anna, First Class. Additionally, on 8 June 1875, he was consecrated as the Bishop of Lublin, auxiliary bishop of the Eparchy of Chełm and Warsaw, in the Saint Isaac's Cathedral in Saint Petersburg. Uniquely, he was not required to take monastic vows before his episcopal consecration, an exceptional occurrence in the history of the Russian Orthodox Church. Furthermore, on 2 February 1876, by special governmental decree, his name was to be commemorated in the former Uniate parishes instead of the ordinary of the Eparchy of Chełm and Warsaw, and he was to have direct control over them. These rights were also granted to subsequent Bishops of Lublin, with Chełm remaining their seat. As a bishop, Markell Popel surrounded himself with clergy from Galicia and initially enjoyed the support of the Ober-Procurator of the Most Holy Synod, Konstantin Pobedonostsev, and the Minister of Education, Dmitry Tolstoy.

Immediately after his consecration, Bishop Markell found himself in conflict with the head of the Eparchy of Chełm and Warsaw, Archbishop Joannicius, who was opposed to the clergy from Galicia. The archbishop also deemed Bishop Markell unworthy of his episcopal office due to his immoral lifestyle. This conflict culminated in Archbishop Joannicius being transferred to the Kherson and Odesa see, likely influenced by Markell’s high-ranking supporters. However, his successor, Archbishop Leontius, also viewed the Galician clergy unfavorably, believing that the mission of promoting Orthodoxy in Chełm Land should be entrusted to local clergy. Due to Leontius' efforts, Markell Popel was reassigned to the Kamianets-Podilskyi diocese and left Chełm. His activities as an Orthodox bishop were also negatively assessed by the Most Holy Synod, including his former supporter Pobedonostsev. After his departure, the previously influential circle of Galician clergy lost their prominence.

=== Bishop of Kamianets-Podilskyi ===
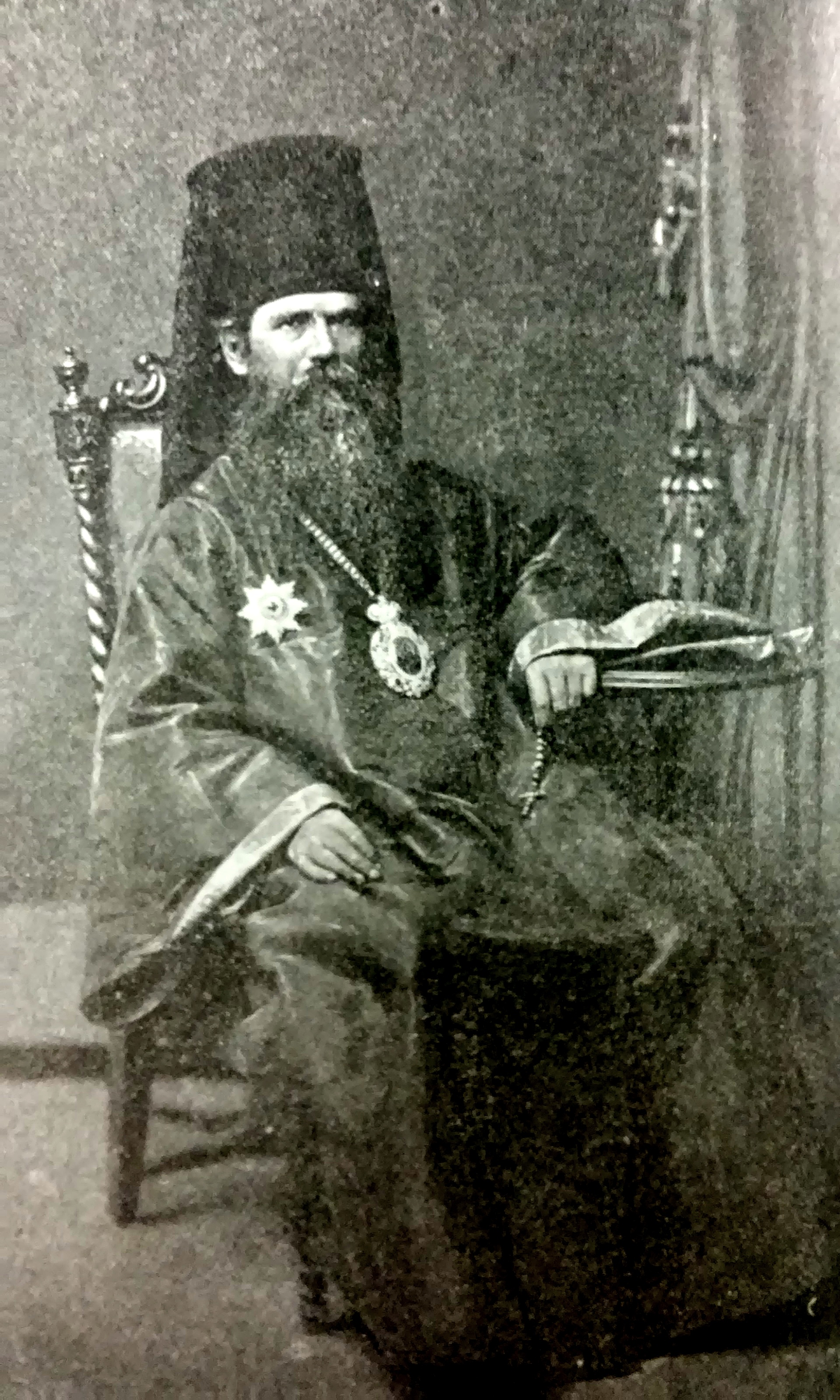
Bishop Markell

On 10 December 1878, the Most Holy Synod appointed Markell Popel as the Bishop of Kamianets-Podilskyi and Bratslav. In this eparchy, he was particularly attentive to the quality of church singing, instructing deans to ensure that parish priests formed choirs composed of parish school students. He awarded those most dedicated to improving the quality of singing. He also emphasized the importance of sermons being comprehensible to all listeners, requiring deans to appoint regular preachers and mandating all clergy to deliver sermons on Sundays and holidays, memorize them, and maintain records for review by the dean and bishop. The bishop himself regularly delivered sermons and published approximately 60 homilies in the eparchial journal, Podolskije Jeparchialnyje Wiedomosti.

=== Bishop of Polotsk ===
On 6 March 1882, Markell Popel was transferred to the Polotsk see. In this eparchy, he focused primarily on organizing parish schools, establishing 172 such institutions. Similar to his efforts in the Kamianets-Podilskyi eparchy, he also prioritized forming high-quality church choirs and the construction and furnishing of churches. In 1887, he founded the Brotherhood of St. Vladimir in Vitebsk.

=== Final years ===
In 1889, Markell Popel retired from the office of Bishop of Polotsk and was placed in retirement. However, he was simultaneously included in the Most Holy Synod and participated in its work until his death. On 16 March 1903, he was elected an honorary member of the Galician-Russian Charity Society.

He died in 1903 in Saint Petersburg and was buried in the Church of St. Isidore in the Alexander Nevsky Lavra complex. In 1932, his remains were transferred to the Nikolskoe Cemetery.

In Polish literature of the late 19th and early 20th centuries, which described the circumstances of the dissolution of the Uniate Chełm diocese and the subsequent tsarist repressions against Uniates resisting forced conversion to Orthodoxy, Bishop Markell Popel, along with Metropolitan Joseph Semashko, is frequently mentioned as one of the greatest enemies of the Uniates and a deceitful perpetrator of their tragedy.

== Family ==
Before 1850, he married Klementyna Ełowiecka (died 1864), with whom he had two sons. One of them, Zinoviev (1850–1889), was ordained as a priest in 1873 and served in the following years at the Cathedral of the Nativity of the Mother of God in Chełm, and also held a teaching position at the theological seminary in Chełm. The other son, Juliyan, also became an Orthodox priest, attained the rank of protopriest, and until World War I, served as the parish priest in the church in Pławanice. He died of cholera in a field hospital in Malaryta during the evacuation into Russia in 1915.

== Bibliography ==
- Osadczy, Włodzimierz (2007). Święta Ruś. Rozwój i oddziaływanie idei prawosławia w Galicji (in Polish). Lublin: Wydawnictwo Uniwersytetu Marii Curie-Skłodowskiej. ISBN 978-83-227-2672-3.
- Kołbuk, Witold (1992). Duchowieństwo unickie w Królestwie Polskim 1835-1875 (in Polish). Lublin: Towarzystwo Naukowe Katolickiego Uniwersytetu Lubelskiego. ISBN 83-85291-09-1.
- Lewandowski, J. (1996). Na pograniczu. Polityka władz państwowych wobec unitów Podlasia i Chełmszczyzny 1772-1875 (in Polish). Lublin: Wydawnictwo Uniwersytetu Marii Curie-Skłodowskiej. ISBN 83-227-0898-X.
