= Pokinianka =

- Village
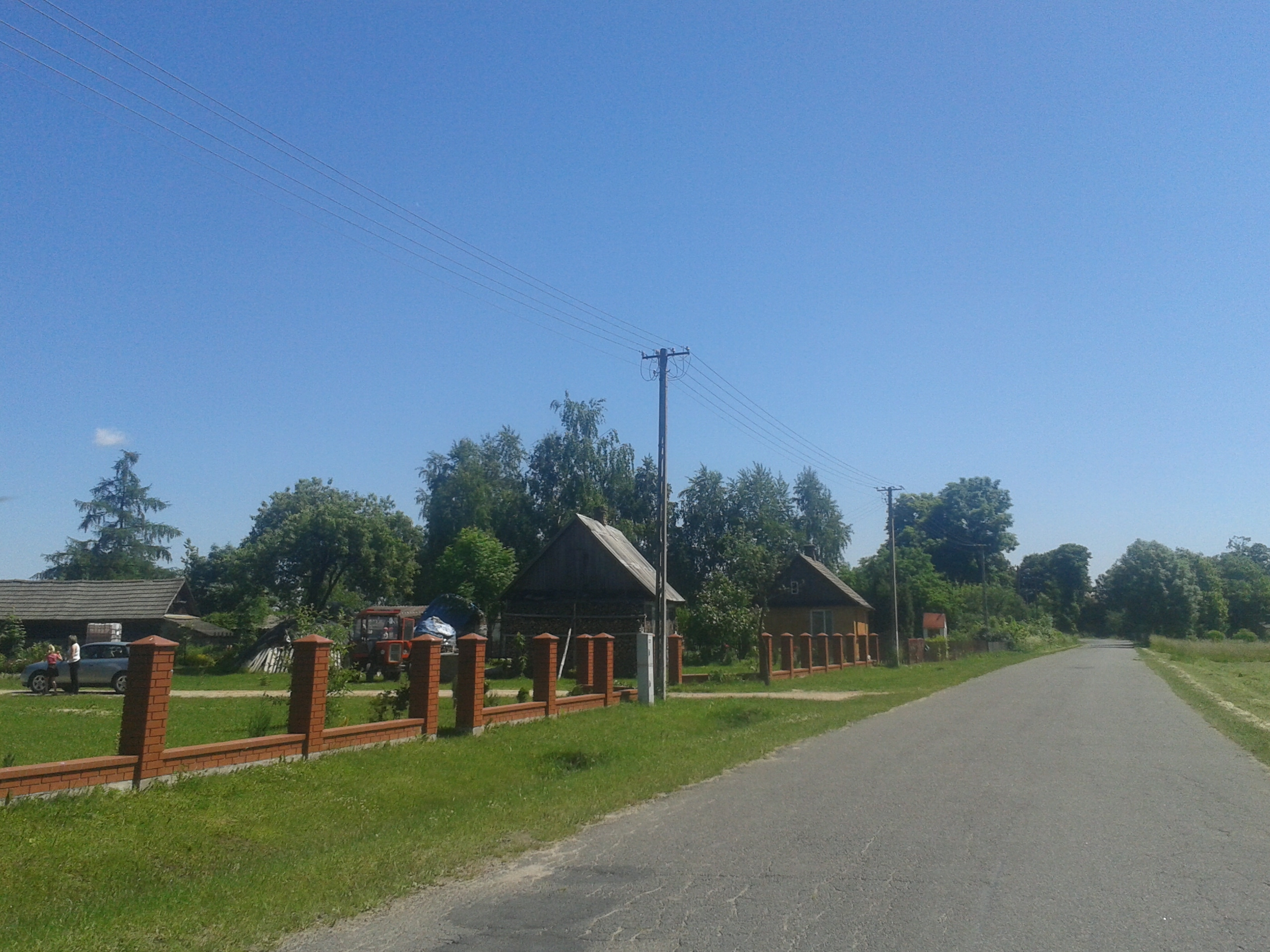

- Location within Poland
- Coordinates: 52°07′45″N 23°19′55″E
- Country: Poland
- Voivodeship: Lublin
- County: Biała
- Gmina: Rokitno

Pokinianka [pɔkʲiˈɲaŋka] is a small village in the administrative district of Gmina Rokitno, within Biała County, Lublin Voivodeship, in eastern Poland, close to the border with Belarus.
