= Cieleśnica =

- Village
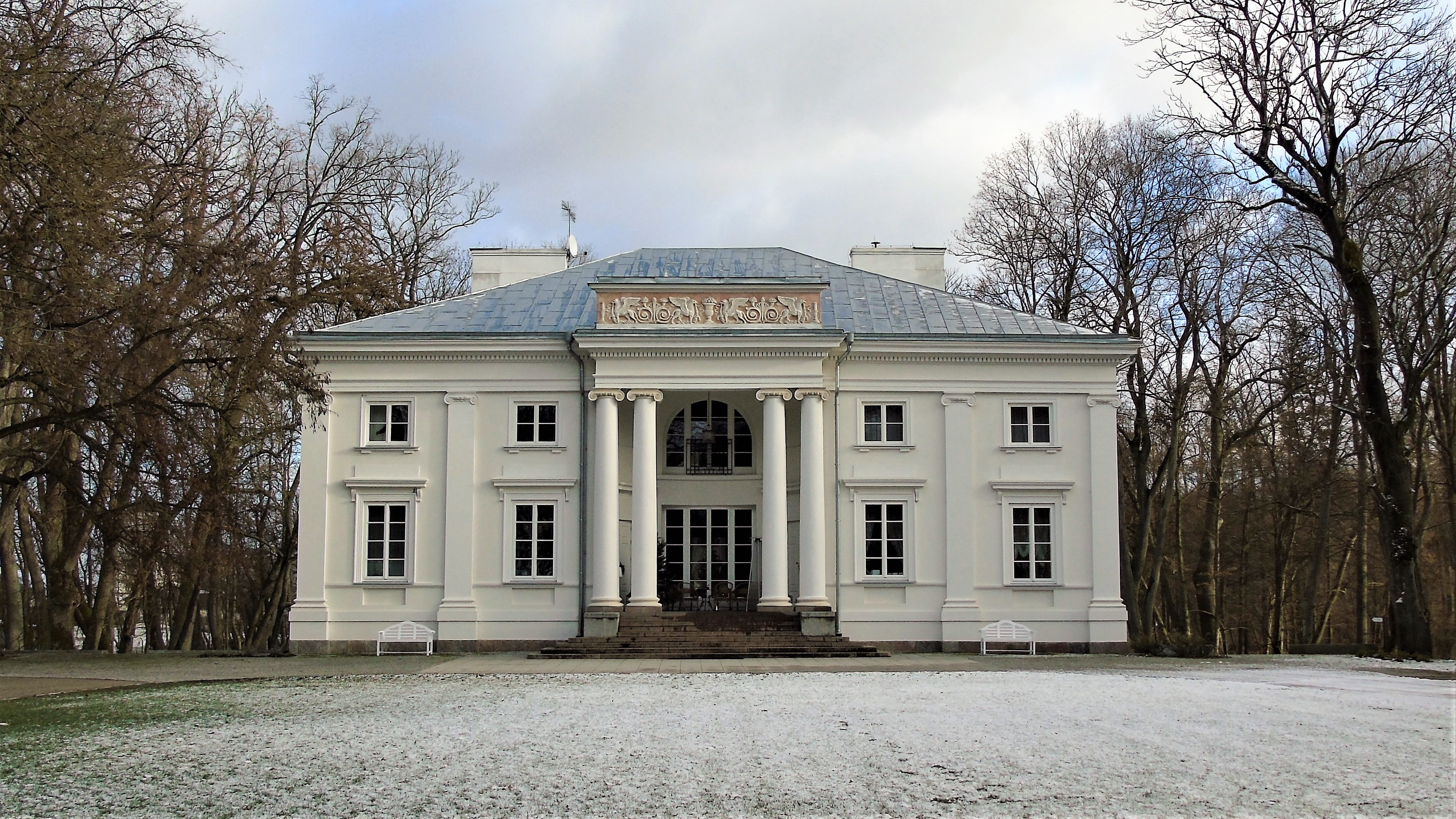
- Cieleśnica Palace

- Location within Poland
- Coordinates: 52°9′N 23°19′E
- Country: Poland
- Voivodeship: Lublin
- County: Biała
- Gmina: Rokitno
- Time zone: UTC+1 (CET)
  - Summer (DST): UTC+2 (CEST)

Cieleśnica [t͡ɕɛlɛɕˈɲit͡sa] is a village in the administrative district of Gmina Rokitno, within Biała County, Lublin Voivodeship, in eastern Poland, close to the border with Belarus. The village is home to Cieleśnica Palace.

== History ==
Seven Polish citizens were murdered by Nazi Germany in the village during World War II.
