= Kołczyn-Kolonia =

- Village
- Location within Poland
- Coordinates: 52°06′51″N 23°24′40″E
- Country: Poland
- Voivodeship: Lublin
- County: Biała
- Gmina: Rokitno

Kołczyn-Kolonia [ˈkɔu̯t͡ʂɨn kɔˈlɔɲa] is a village in the administrative district of Gmina Rokitno, within Biała County, Lublin Voivodeship, in eastern Poland, close to the border with Belarus.
