= Łobaczew Duży =

- Village
- Location within Poland
- Coordinates: 52°04′44″N 23°35′20″E
- Country: Poland
- Voivodeship: Lublin
- County: Biała
- Gmina: Terespol

Population
  - Total: 430

Łobaczew Duży [wɔˈbat͡ʂɛf ˈduʐɨ] is a village in the administrative district of Gmina Terespol, within Biała County, Lublin Voivodeship, in eastern Poland, close to the border with Belarus.
