= Małaszewicze Duże =

- Village
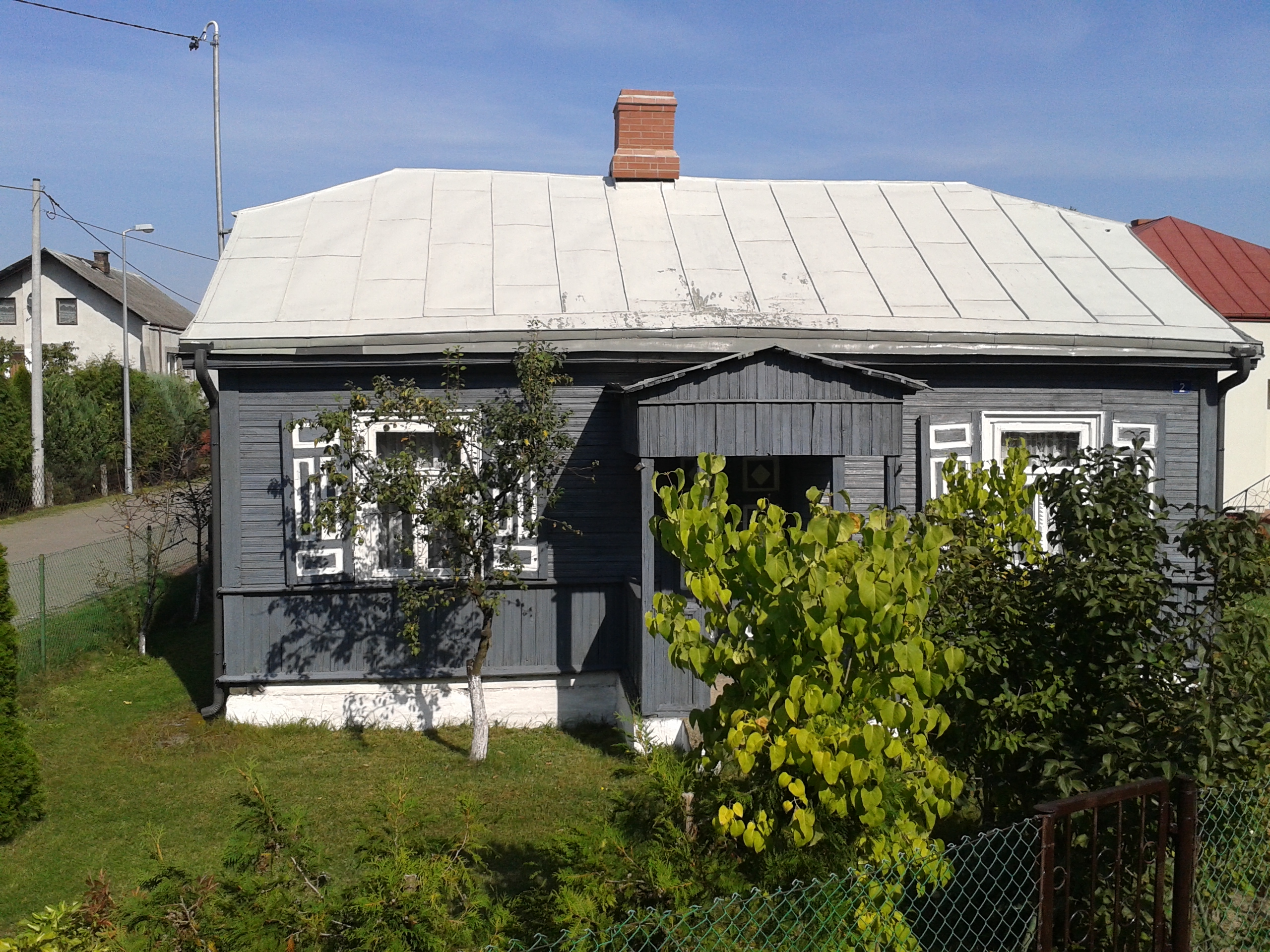
- A residential building in the village of Małaszewicze Duże

- Location within Poland
- Coordinates: 52°2′N 23°31′E
- Country: Poland
- Voivodeship: Lublin
- County: Biała
- Gmina: Terespol

Małaszewicze Duże [mawaʂɛˈvʲit͡ʂɛ ˈduʐɛ] is a village in the administrative district of Gmina Terespol, within Biała County, Lublin Voivodeship, in eastern Poland, close to the border with Belarus.
