= Starzynka, Lublin Voivodeship =

Starzynka
- Village
- Location within Poland
- Coordinates: 52°07′14″N 23°30′53″E
- Country: Poland
- Voivodeship: Lublin
- County: Biała
- Gmina: Terespol

Starzynka [staˈʐɨŋka] is a village in the administrative district of Gmina Terespol, within Biała County, Lublin Voivodeship, in eastern Poland, close to the border with Belarus.
