= Olszyn =

- Village
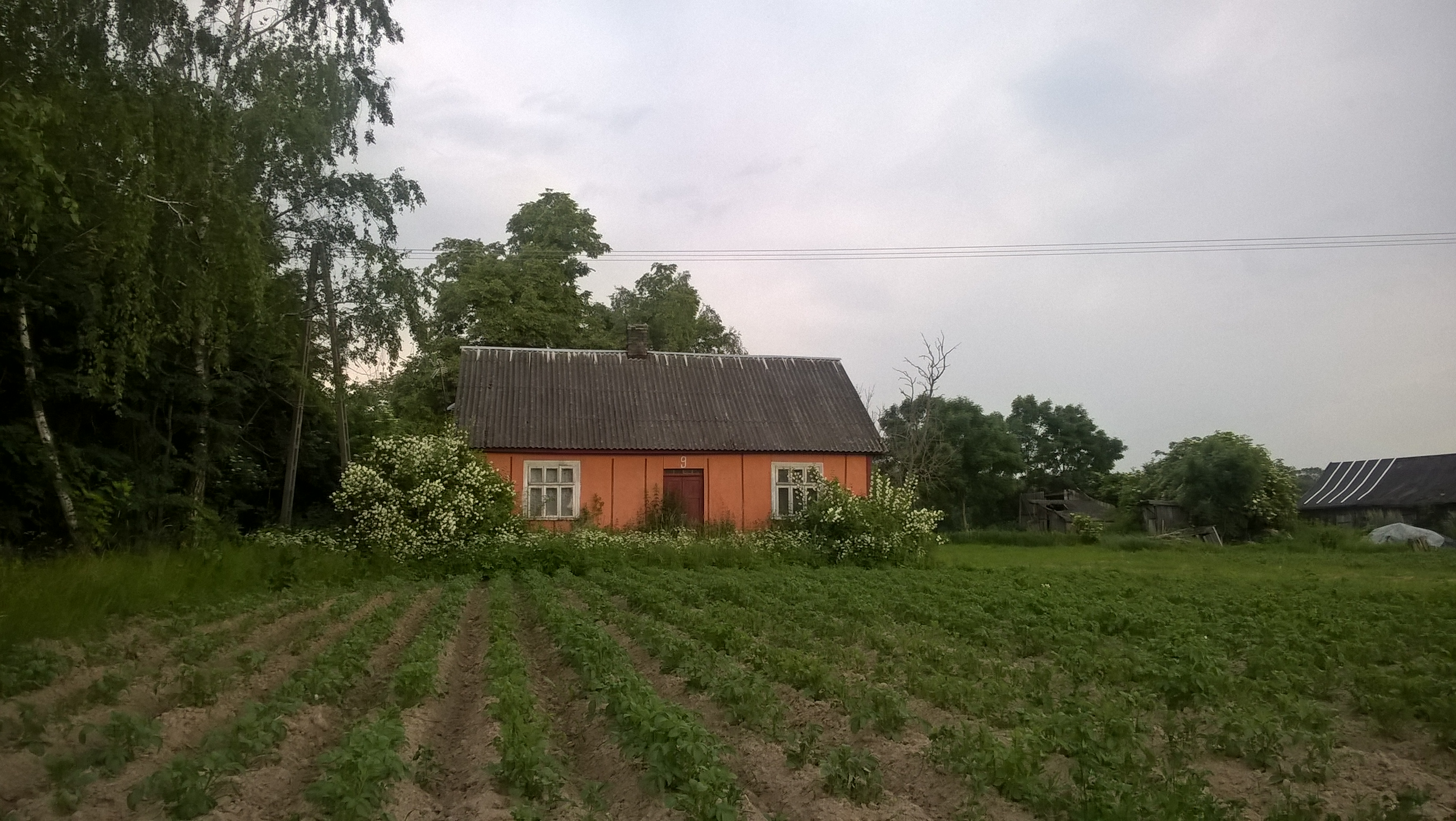

- Location within Poland
- Coordinates: 52°8′N 23°23′E
- Country: Poland
- Voivodeship: Lublin
- County: Biała
- Gmina: Rokitno
- Time zone: UTC+1 (CET)
  - Summer (DST): UTC+2 (CEST)

Olszyn [ˈɔlʂɨn] is a village in the administrative district of Gmina Rokitno, near Biała Podlaska in eastern Poland, close to the border with Belarus.

== History ==
Seven Polish citizens were murdered by Nazi Germany in the village during World War II.
