= Michałki-Kolonia =

- Village
- Location within Poland
- Coordinates: 52°6′16″N 23°17′37″E
- Country: Poland
- Voivodeship: Lublin
- County: Biała
- Gmina: Rokitno

Michałki-Kolonia (Polish pronunciation: [miˈxawkʲi kɔˈlɔɲa]) is a village in the administrative district of Gmina Rokitno, within Biała County, Lublin Voivodeship, in eastern Poland, close to the border with Belarus.
