= Lipnica, Lublin Voivodeship =

Lipnica
- Village
- Location within Poland
- Coordinates: 52°6′N 23°19′E
- Country: Poland
- Voivodeship: Lublin
- County: Biała
- Gmina: Rokitno
- Time zone: UTC+1 (CET)
  - Summer (DST): UTC+2 (CEST)

Lipnica (Polish pronunciation: [lipˈɲit͡sa]) is a village in the administrative district of Gmina Rokitno, within Biała County, Lublin Voivodeship, in eastern Poland, close to the border with Belarus.

== History ==
Three Polish citizens were murdered by Nazi Germany in the village during World War II.
