= Małaszewicze Małe =

- Village
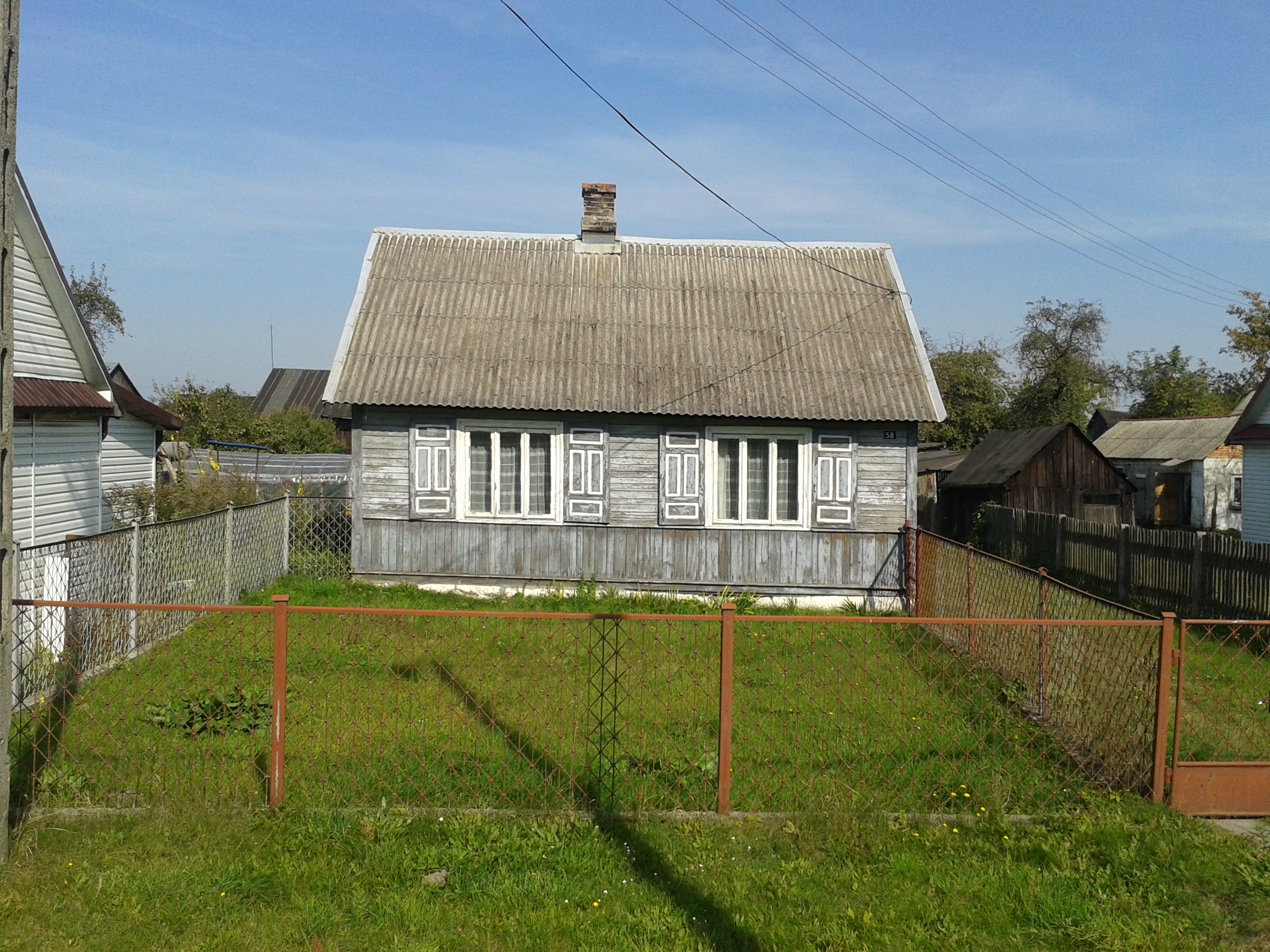
- Building on the main road of Małaszewicz Małe village

- Location within Poland
- Coordinates: 52°2′N 23°32′E
- Country: Poland
- Voivodeship: Lublin
- County: Biała
- Gmina: Terespol

Małaszewicze Małe [mawaʂɛˈvʲit͡ʂɛ ˈmawɛ] is a village in the administrative district of Gmina Terespol, within Biała County, Lublin Voivodeship, in eastern Poland, close to the border with Belarus.
