= Koroszczyn =

- Village
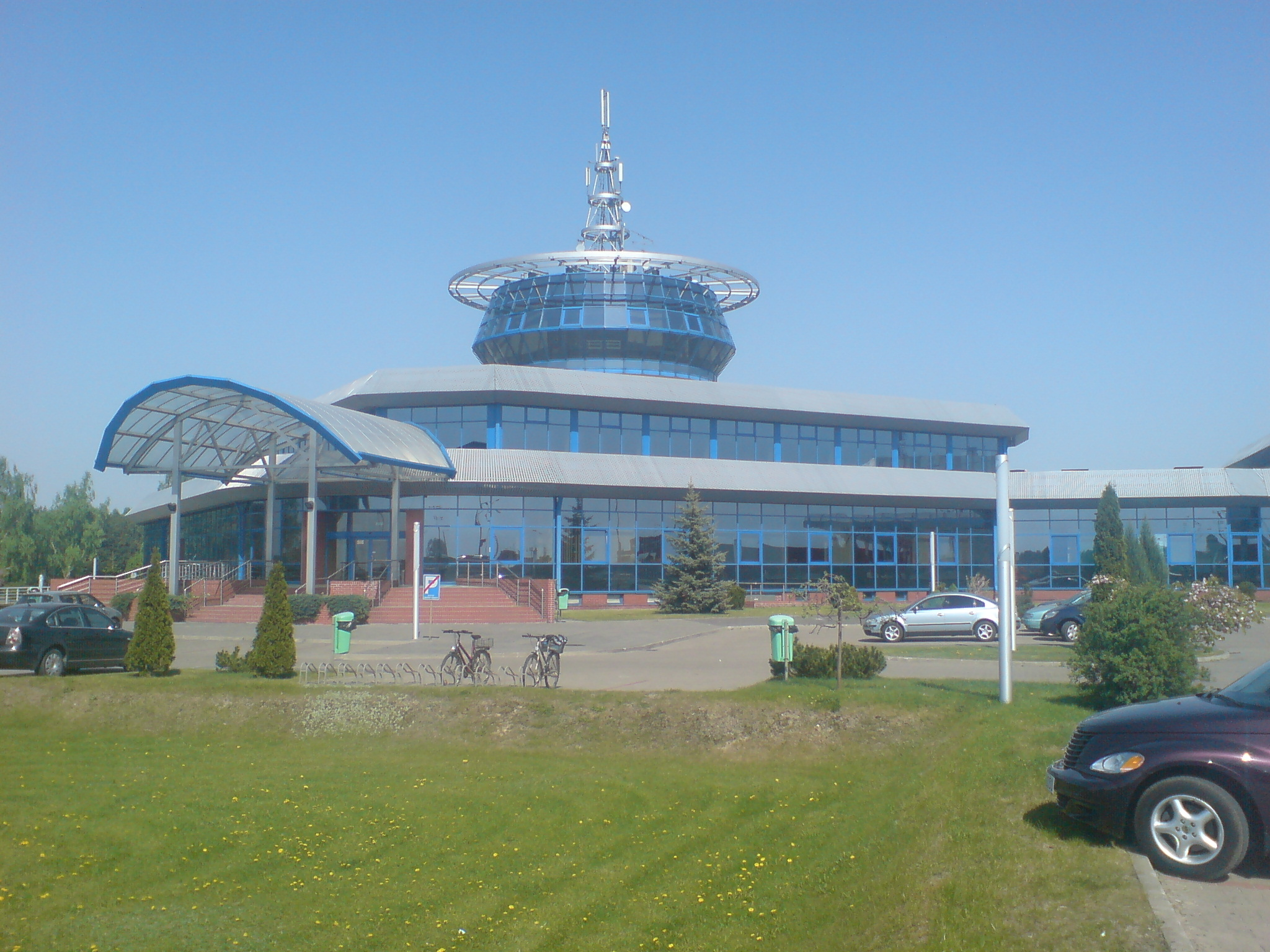
- Koroszczyn Terminal

- Location within Poland
- Coordinates: 52°5′N 23°33′E
- Country: Poland
- Voivodeship: Lublin
- County: Biała
- Gmina: Terespol

Population
  - Total: 660

Koroszczyn [kɔˈrɔʂt͡ʂɨn] is a village in the administrative district of Gmina Terespol, within Biała County, Lublin Voivodeship, in eastern Poland, close to the border with Belarus.
