= Klonownica Duża =

- Village
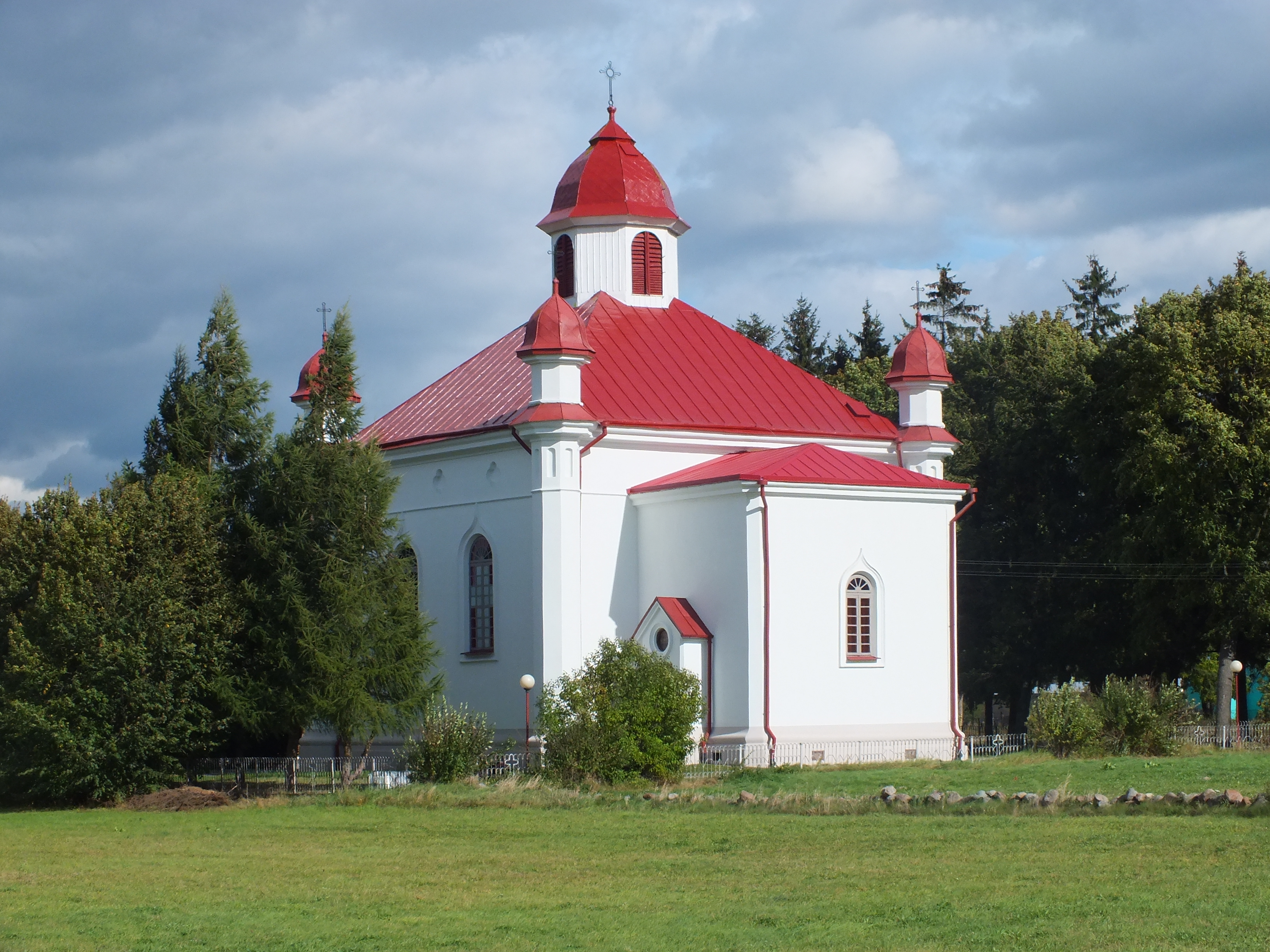
- St. John the Evangelist church in Klonownica Duża

- Location within Poland
- Coordinates: 52°8′23″N 23°12′0″E
- Country: Poland
- Voivodeship: Lublin
- County: Biała
- Gmina: Rokitno
- Time zone: UTC+1 (CET)
  - Summer (DST): UTC+2 (CEST)

Klonownica Duża [klɔnɔvˈɲit͡sa ˈduʐa] is a village in the administrative district of Gmina Rokitno, within Biała County, Lublin Voivodeship, in eastern Poland, close to the border with Belarus.

== History ==
12 Polish citizens were murdered by Nazi Germany in the village during World War II.
