= Hołodnica =

- Village
- Location within Poland
- Coordinates: 52°9′N 23°16′E
- Country: Poland
- Voivodeship: Lublin
- County: Biała
- Gmina: Rokitno

Hołodnica [xɔwɔdˈɲit͡sa] is a village in the administrative district of Gmina Rokitno, within Biała County, Lublin Voivodeship, in eastern Poland, near the border of Belarus.
