= Michalków =

- Village
- Location within Poland
- Coordinates: 52°02′59″N 23°38′39″E
- Country: Poland
- Voivodeship: Lublin
- County: Biała
- Gmina: Terespol

Michalków (Polish pronunciation: [miˈxalkuf]) is a village in the administrative district of Gmina Terespol, within Biała County, Lublin Voivodeship, in eastern Poland, close to the border with Belarus.
