= Kołczyn, Lublin Voivodeship =

Kołczyn
- Village
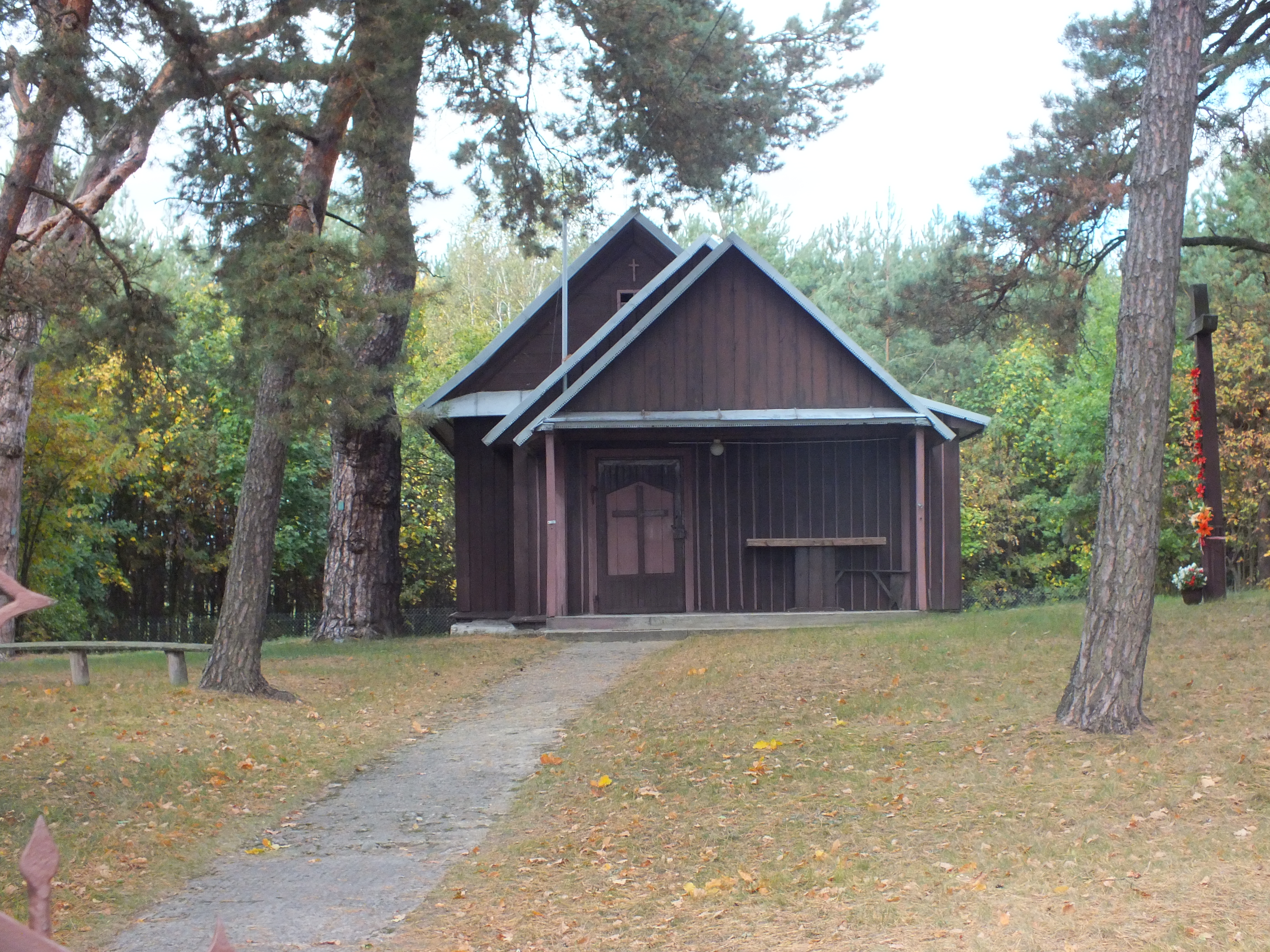
- Chapel of Saint Anne

- Location within Poland
- Coordinates: 52°7′N 23°26′E
- Country: Poland
- Voivodeship: Lublin
- County: Biała
- Gmina: Rokitno

Kołczyn [ˈkɔu̯t͡ʂɨn] is a village in the administrative district of Gmina Rokitno, within Biała County, Lublin Voivodeship, in eastern Poland, close to the border with Belarus.
