= Dobratycze-Kolonia =

- Village
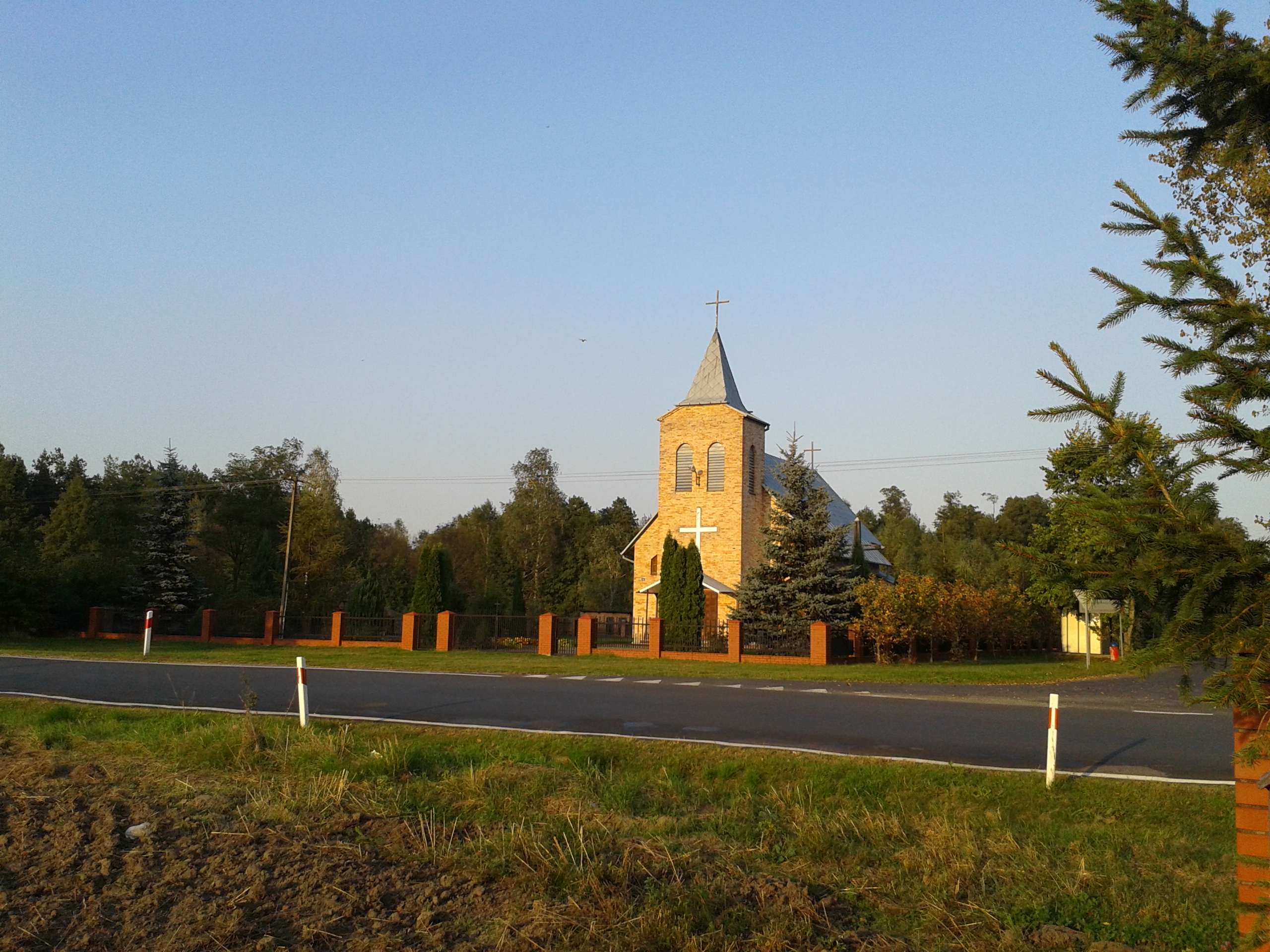

- Location within Poland
- Coordinates: 52°00′52″N 23°38′00″E
- Country: Poland
- Voivodeship: Lublin
- County: Biała
- Gmina: Terespol

Dobratycze-Kolonia [dɔbraˈtɨt͡ʂɛ kɔˈlɔɲa] is a village in the administrative district of Gmina Terespol, within Biała County, Lublin Voivodeship, in eastern Poland, close to the border with Belarus.
