= Gmina Terespol =

Gmina Terespol Terespol Commune
- Gmina
- Flag Coat of arms
- Interactive map of Gmina Terespol
- Coordinates (Terespol): 52°5′N 23°34′E
- Country: Poland
- Voivodeship: Lublin
- County: Biała County
- Seat: Terespol

Area
  - Total: 141.31 km^{2} (54.56 sq mi)

Population (2019)
  - Total: 5,560
  - Density: 39.3/km^{2} (102/sq mi)
- Website: http://www.terespol.ug.gov.pl

Gmina Terespol is a rural gmina (administrative district) in Biała County, Lublin Voivodeship, in eastern Poland, on the border with Belarus. Its seat is the town of Terespol, although the town is not part of the territory of the gmina.

The gmina covers an area of 141.31 square kilometres (54.6 sq mi), and as of 2006 its total population is 7,037 (6,839 in 2014).

The gmina contains part of the protected area called Podlasie Bug Gorge Landscape Park.

== Villages ==
Gmina Terespol contains the villages and settlements of Bohukały, Dobratycze-Kolonia, Kobylany, Kołpin, Koroszczyn, Kukuryki, Kużawka, Lebiedziew, Lechuty Duże, Lechuty Małe, Łęgi, Łobaczew Duży, Łobaczew Mały, Małaszewicze, Małaszewicze Duże, Małaszewicze Małe, Michalków, Murawiec, Neple, Podolanka, Polatycze, Samowicze, Starzynka, Zastawek and Żuki.

== Neighbouring gminas ==
Gmina Terespol is bordered by the town of Terespol and by the gminas of Kodeń, Piszczac, Rokitno and Zalesie. It also borders Belarus.
