= Polatycze =

- Village
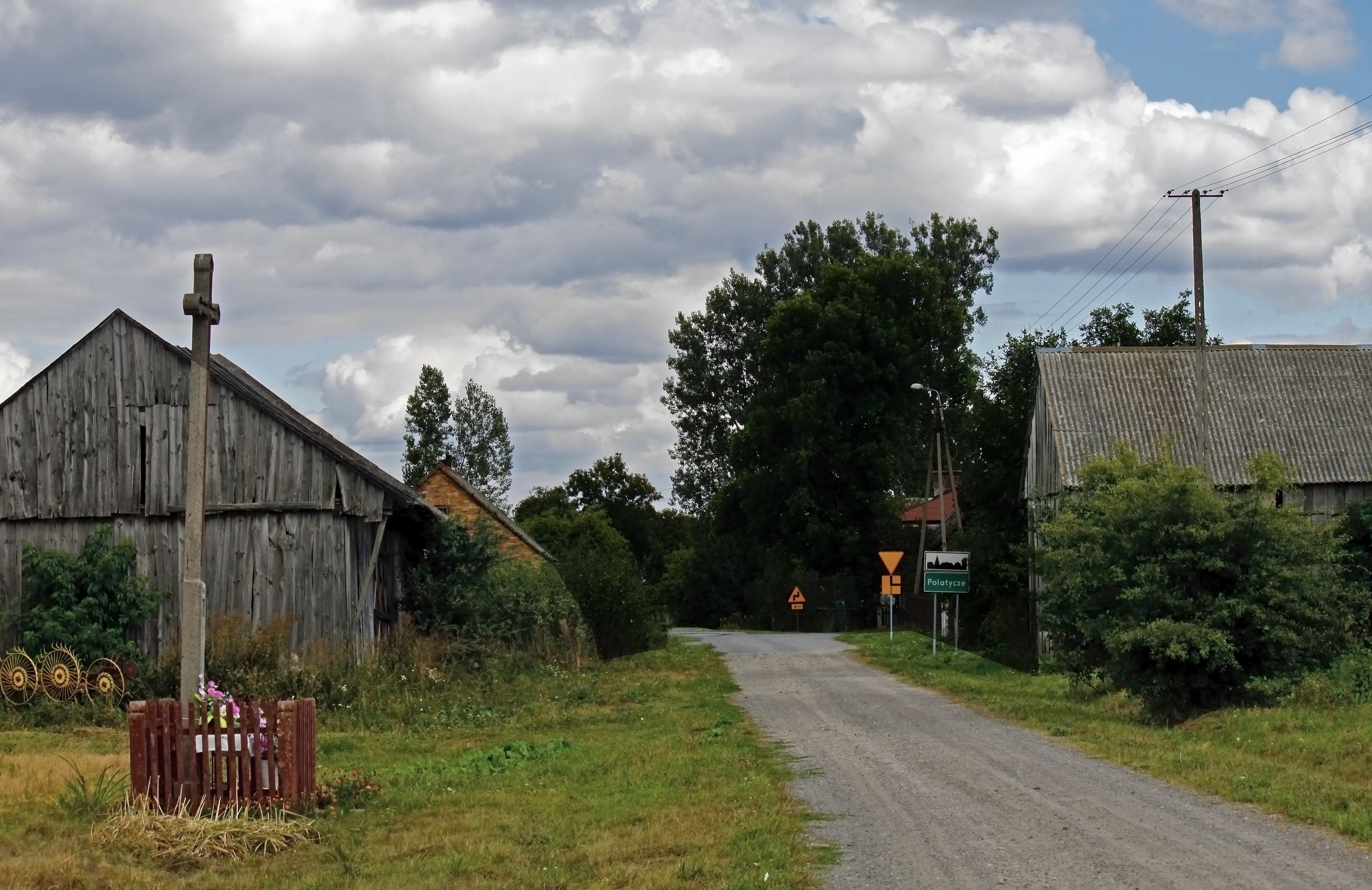

- Location within Poland
- Coordinates: 52°3′N 23°36′E
- Country: Poland
- Voivodeship: Lublin
- County: Biała
- Gmina: Terespol
- Time zone: UTC+1 (CET)
  - Summer (DST): UTC+2 (CEST)
- Vehicle registration: LBI

Polatycze [pɔlaˈtɨt͡ʂɛ] is a village in the administrative district of Gmina Terespol, within Biała County, Lublin Voivodeship, in eastern Poland, close to the border with Belarus.
