= Kużawka =

- Village
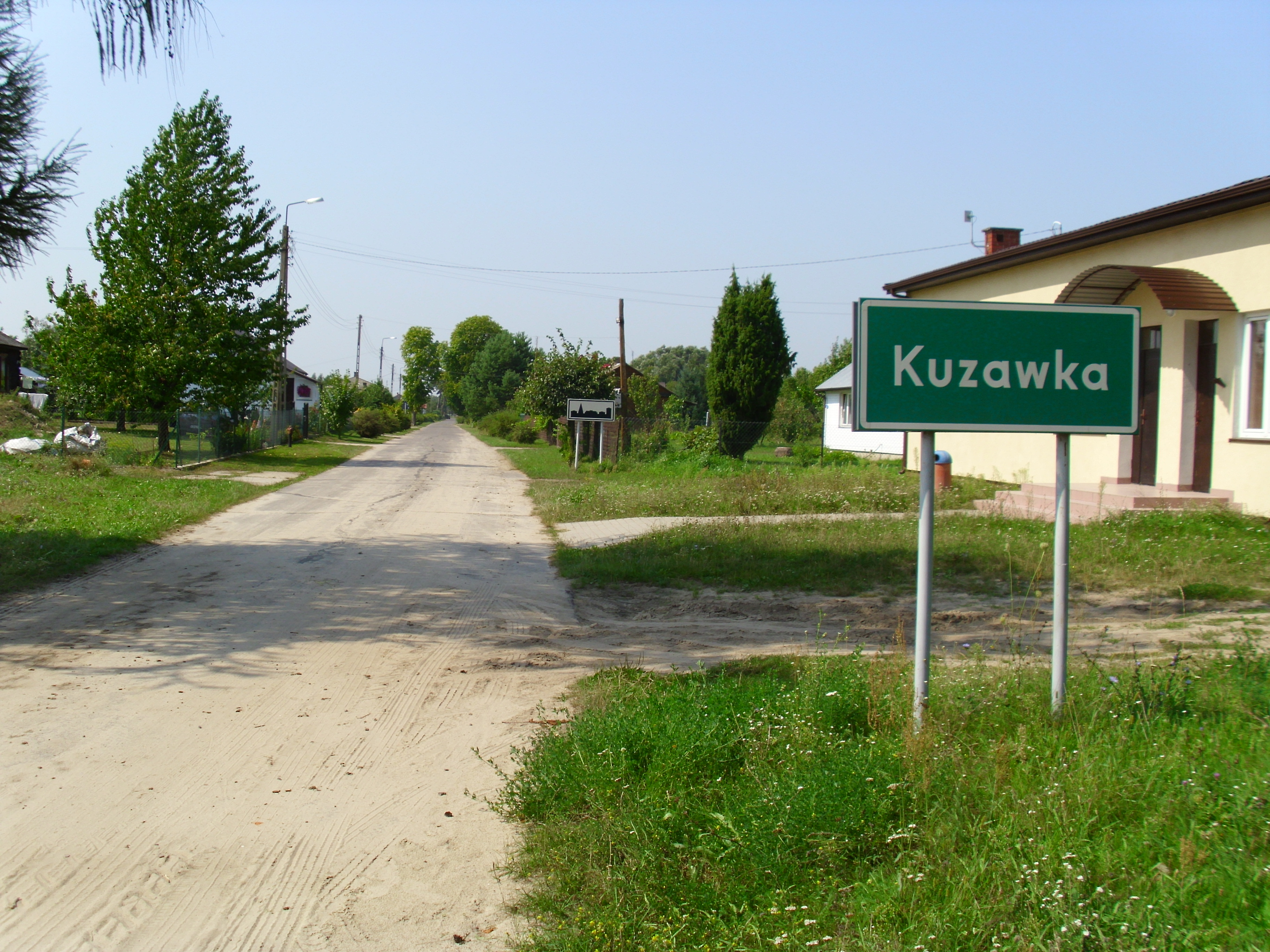
- Kużawka

- Location within Poland
- Coordinates: 52°6′N 23°32′E
- Country: Poland
- Voivodeship: Lublin
- County: Biała
- Gmina: Terespol

Kużawka [kuˈʐafka] is a village in the administrative district of Gmina Terespol, within Biała County, Lublin Voivodeship, in eastern Poland, close to the border with Belarus.
