= Samowicze =

- Village
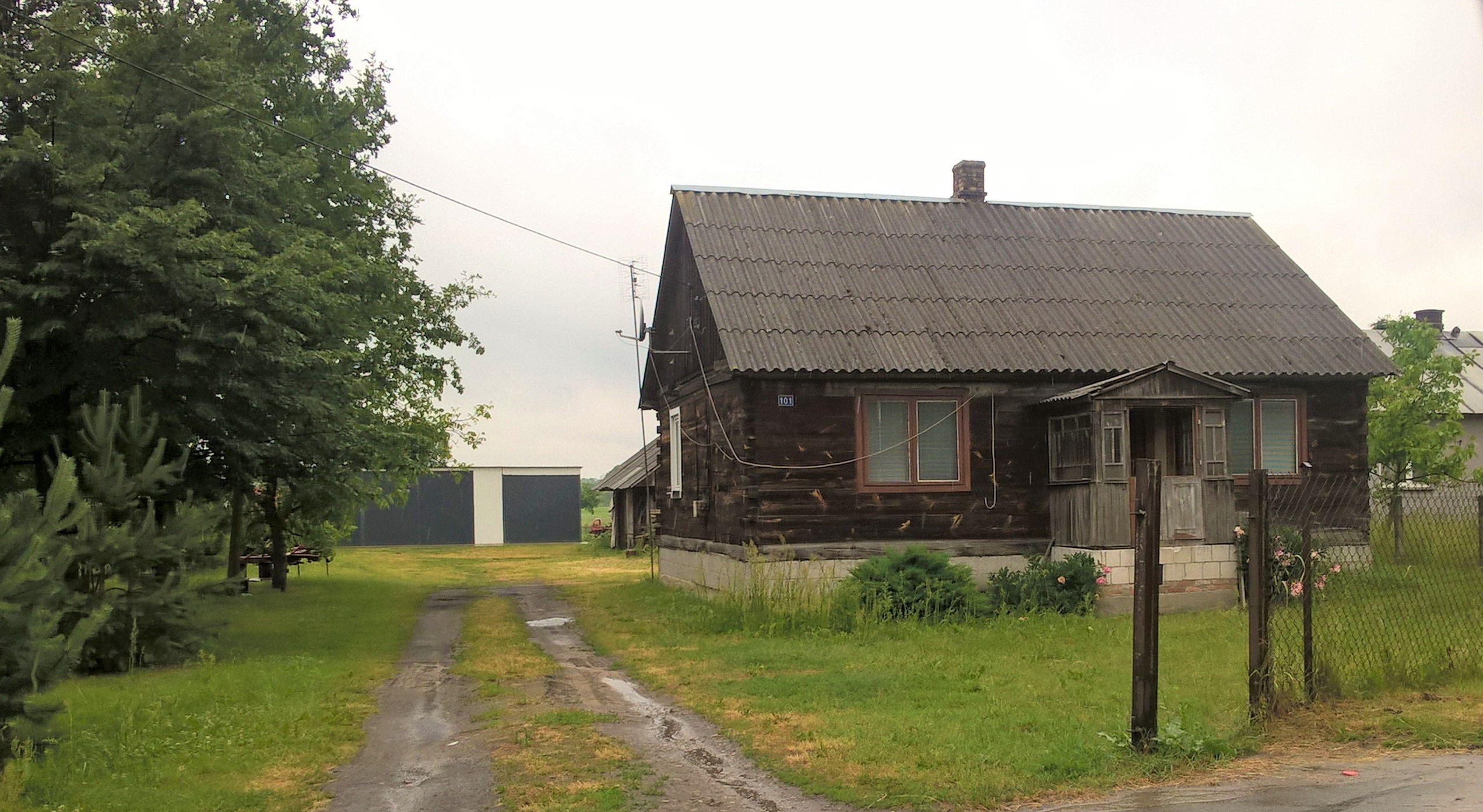
- A wooden house in Samowicze

- Location within Poland
- Coordinates: 52°7′N 23°35′E
- Country: Poland
- Voivodeship: Lublin
- County: Biała
- Gmina: Terespol

Samowicze [samɔˈvʲit͡ʂɛ] is a village in the administrative district of Gmina Terespol, within Biała County, Lublin Voivodeship, in eastern Poland, close to the border with Belarus.
