= Rokitno, Gmina Rokitno =

Rokitno
- Village
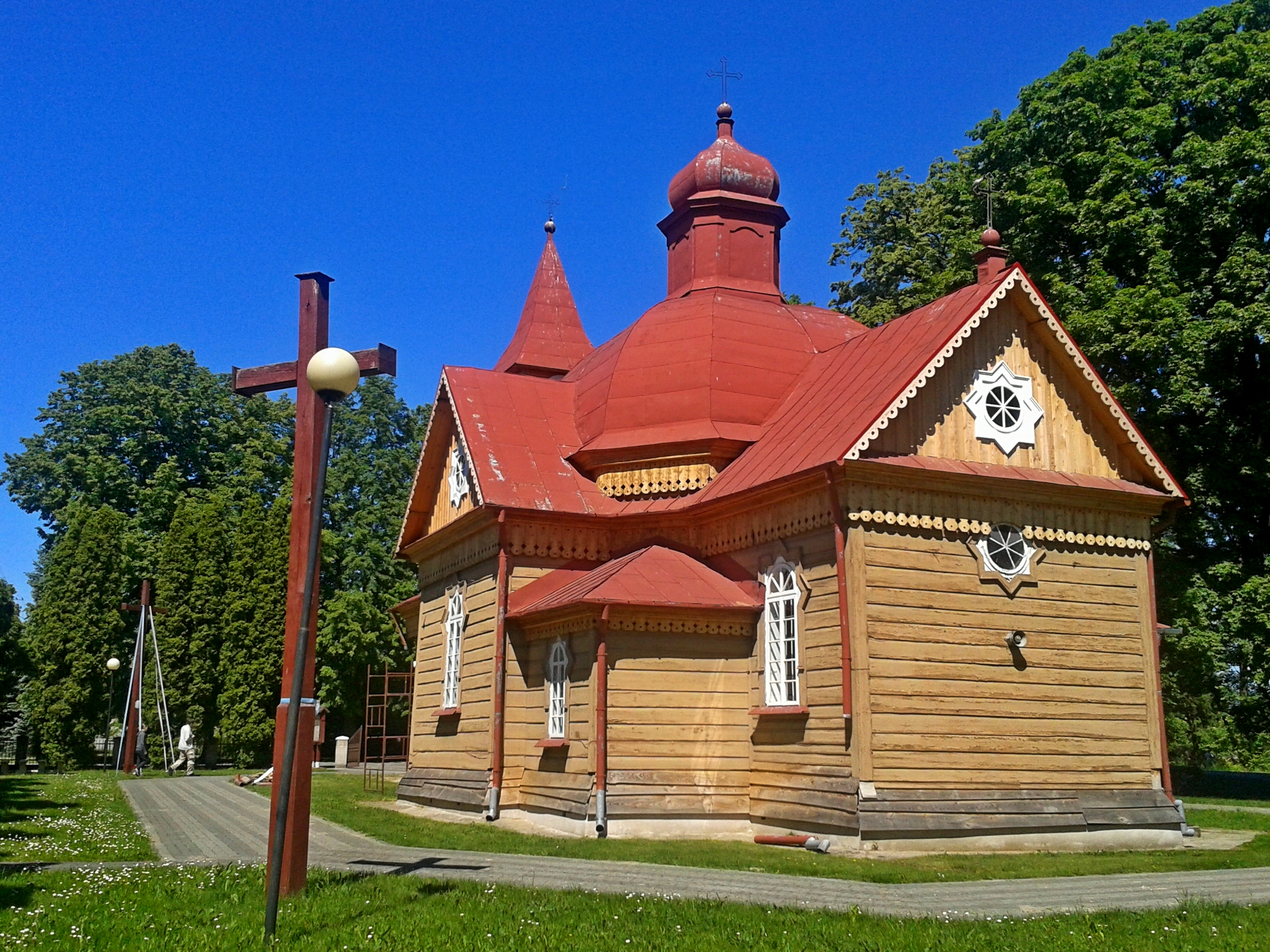
- Church of the Holy Trinity

- Location within Poland
- Coordinates: 52°7′N 23°17′E
- Country: Poland
- Voivodeship: Lublin
- County: Biała
- Gmina: Rokitno

Rokitno [rɔˈkʲitnɔ] is a village in Biała County, Lublin Voivodeship, in eastern Poland, close to the border with Belarus. It is the seat of the gmina (administrative district) called Gmina Rokitno.

== Early history ==
The land of Rokitno was originally owned by Princess Anila Rzyszczewska. Rokitno was once thought to have been a much larger town, extending eastward to the villages of Sohov and Osnitzek, prior to being reduced by decree.

== Films ==
- "Children of the Forest: The Life of Yona Bromberg". In the documentary Yona Bromberg, Holocaust survivor, recalls the German occupation of Rokitno during an interview with filmmaker Eduardo Montes-Bradley.
