= Lechuty Duże =

- Village
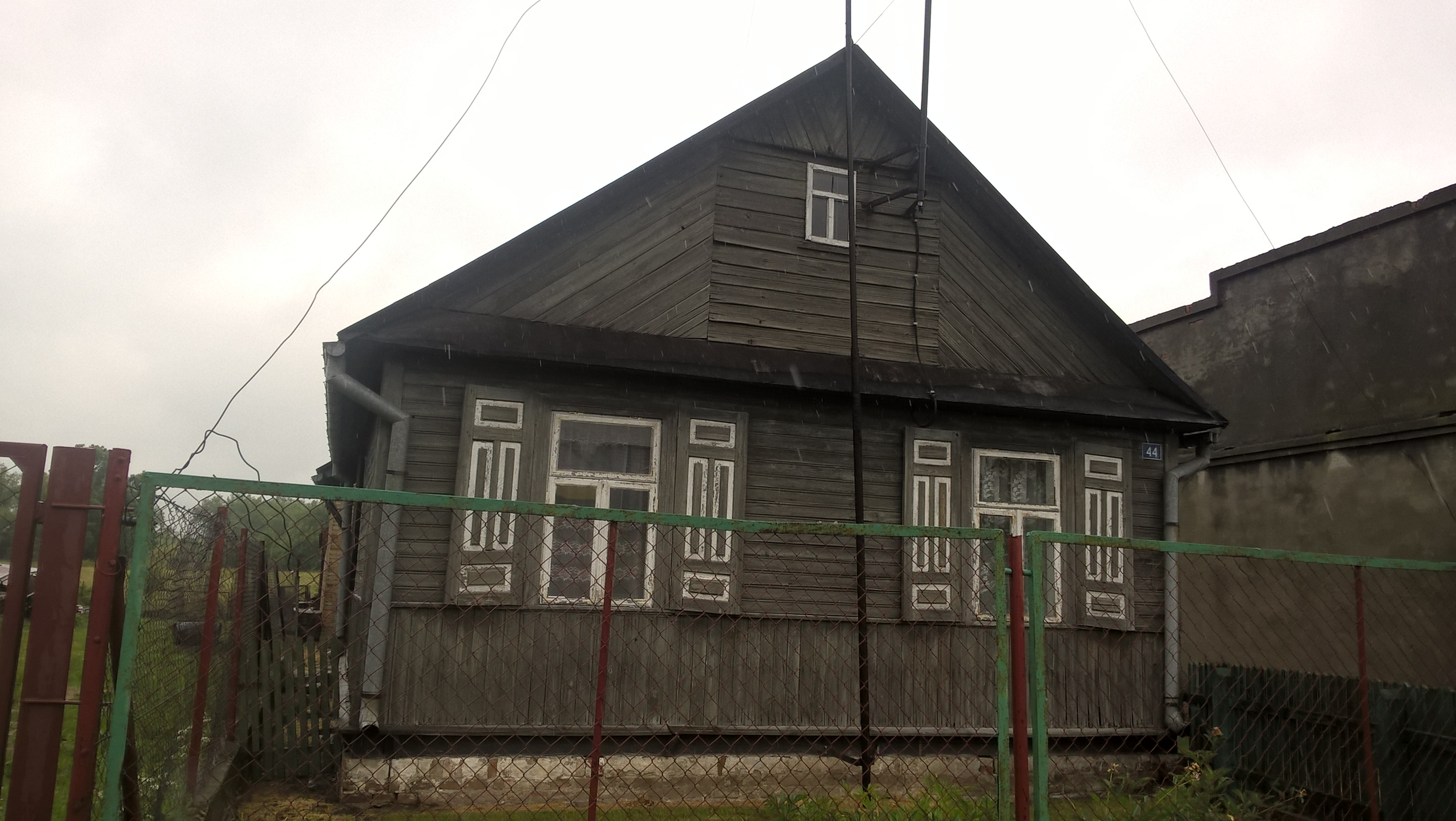

- Location within Poland
- Coordinates: 52°04′40″N 23°34′42″E
- Country: Poland
- Voivodeship: Lublin
- County: Biała
- Gmina: Terespol

Population
  - Total: 68

Lechuty Duże [lɛˈxutɨ ˈduʐɛ] is a village in the administrative district of Gmina Terespol, within Biała County, Lublin Voivodeship, in eastern Poland, close to the border with Belarus.
