= Zaczopki =

- Village
- Location within Poland
- Coordinates: 52°10′N 23°25′E
- Country: Poland
- Voivodeship: Lublin
- County: Biała
- Gmina: Rokitno

Zaczopki [zaˈt͡ʂɔpkʲi] is a village in the administrative district of Gmina Rokitno, within Biała County, Lublin Voivodeship, in eastern Poland, close to the border with Belarus.
