= Rokitno-Kolonia =

- Village
- Location within Poland
- Coordinates: 52°7′35″N 23°19′3″E
- Country: Poland
- Voivodeship: Lublin
- County: Biała
- Gmina: Rokitno

Population
  - Total: 110

Rokitno-Kolonia [rɔˈkʲitnɔ kɔˈlɔɲa] is a village in the administrative district of Gmina Rokitno, within Biała County, Lublin Voivodeship, in eastern Poland, close to the border with Belarus.
