= Podolanka, Czech Republic =

Podolanka
- Municipality
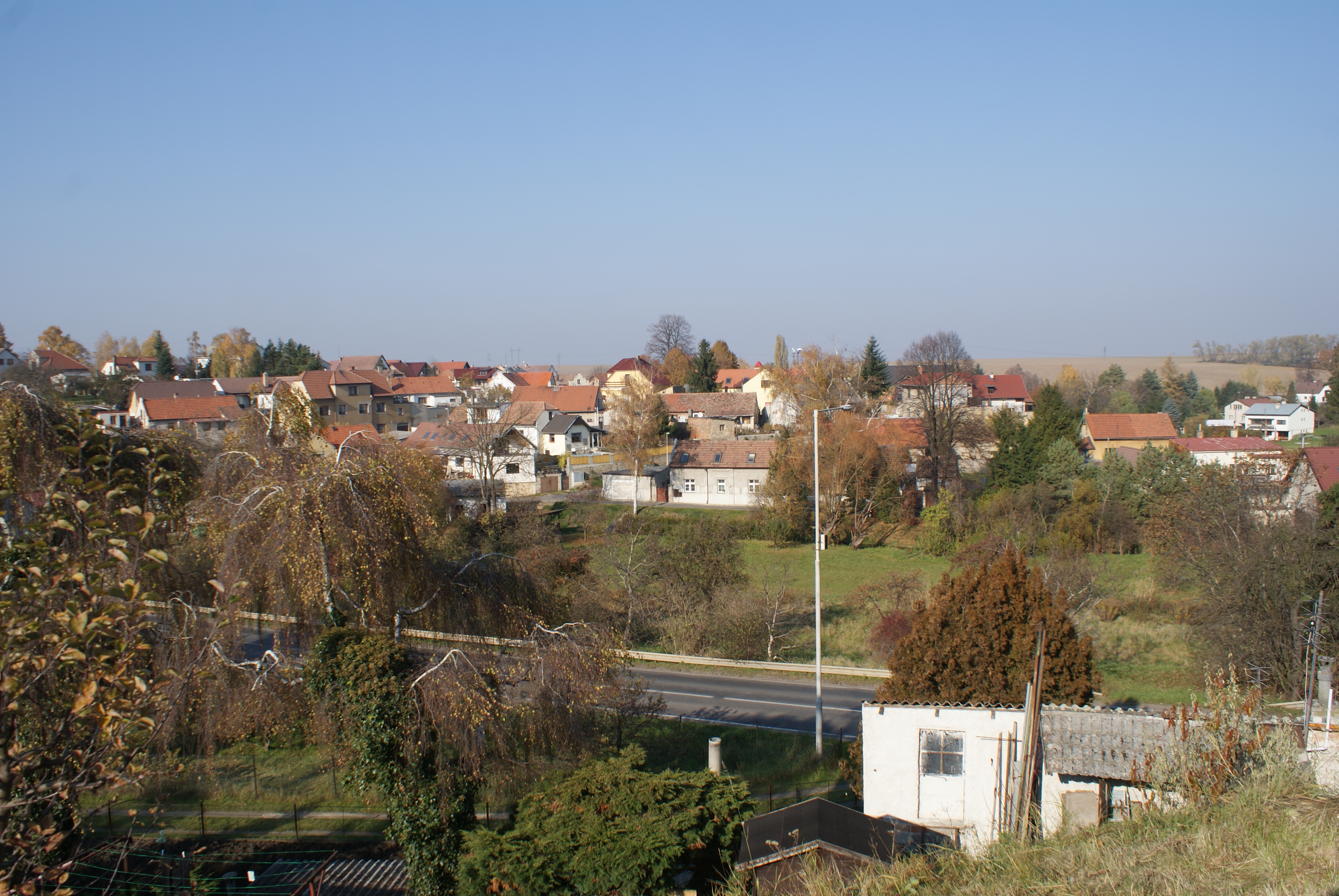
- General view

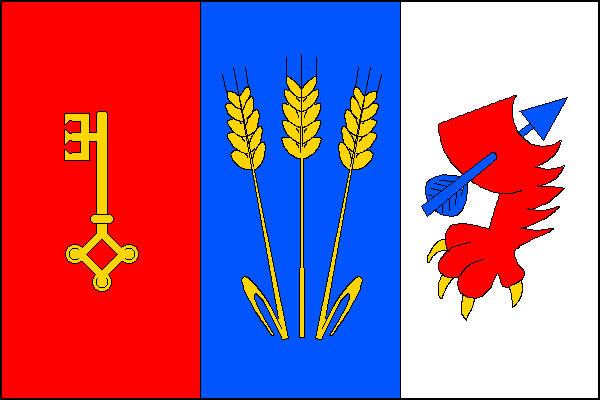
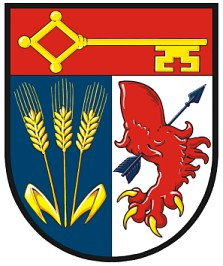
- Flag Coat of arms

- Location in the Czech Republic
- Coordinates: 50°9′33″N 14°36′4″E
- Country: Czech Republic
- Region: Central Bohemian
- District: Prague-East
- First mentioned: 1748

Area
  - Total: 3.30 km^{2} (1.27 sq mi)
- Elevation: 232 m (761 ft)

Population (2026-01-01)
  - Total: 639
  - Density: 194/km^{2} (502/sq mi)
- Time zone: UTC+1 (CET)
  - Summer (DST): UTC+2 (CEST)
- Postal code: 250 73
- Website: www.podolanka.cz

Podolanka is a municipality and village in Prague-East District in the Central Bohemian Region of the Czech Republic. It has about 600 inhabitants.

== Geography ==
Podolanka is located about 7 kilometres (4 mi) northeast of Prague. It lies in a flat agricultural landscape in the Central Elbe Table.

== Demographics ==
Historical population
Year	Pop.	±%
1869	286	—
1880	414	+44.8%
1890	454	+9.7%
1900	467	+2.9%
1910	509	+9.0%
1921	479	−5.9%
1930	521	+8.8%
1950	452	−13.2%
1961	527	+16.6%
1970	546	+3.6%
1980	524	−4.0%
1991	474	−9.5%
2001	488	+3.0%
2011	564	+15.6%
2021	631	+11.9%
Source: Censuses
