= Łęgi, Lublin Voivodeship =

Łęgi
- Village
- Location within Poland
- Coordinates: 52°10′N 23°28′E
- Country: Poland
- Voivodeship: Lublin
- County: Biała
- Gmina: Terespol

Łęgi [ˈwɛŋɡʲi] is a village in the administrative district of Gmina Terespol, within Biała County, Lublin Voivodeship, in eastern Poland, close to the border with Belarus.
