= Cieleśnica Palace =

Palace in Poland

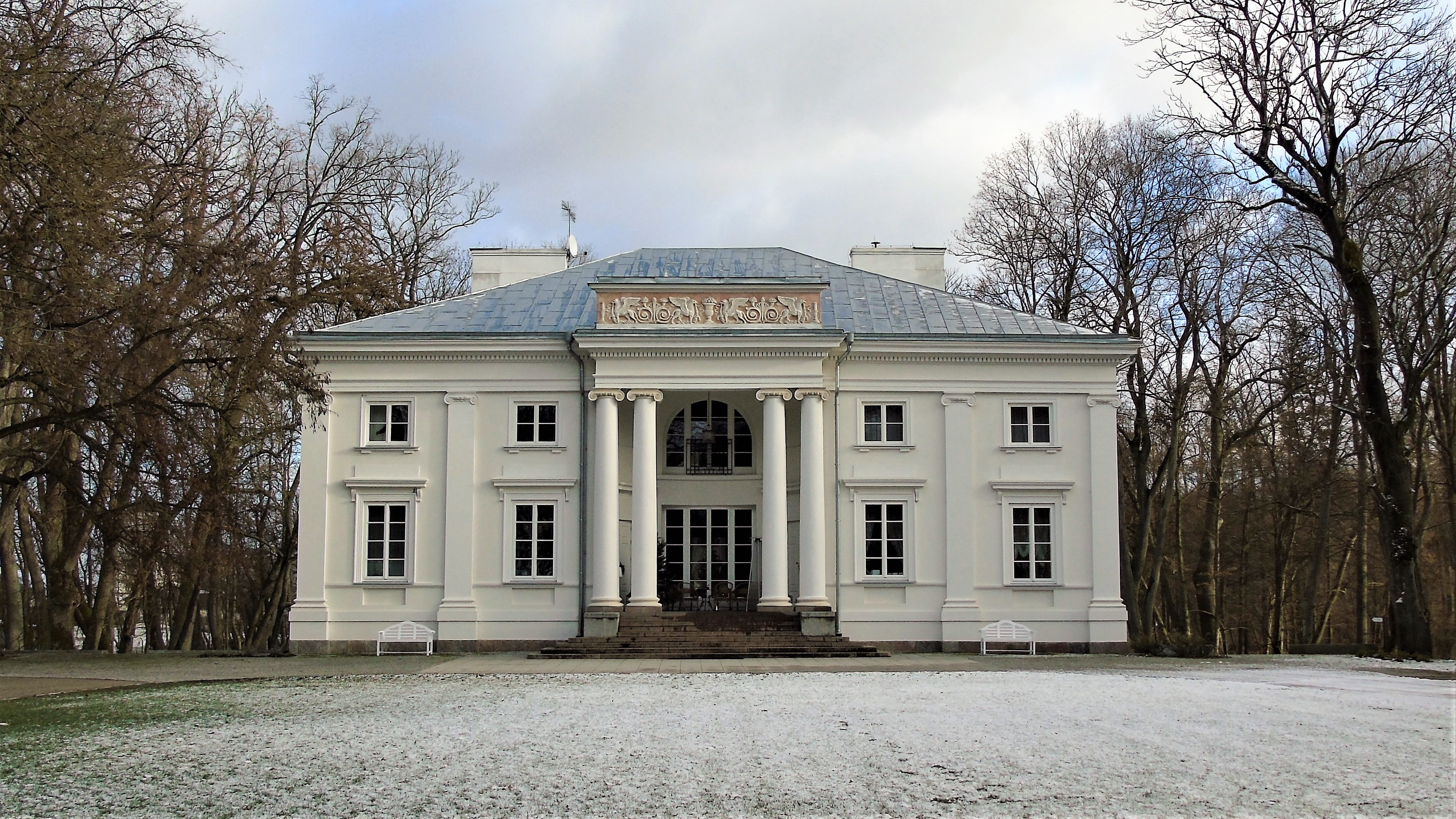

- Location within Poland

General information
- Type: palace
- Architectural style: Italian Renaissance
- Location: Poland
- Coordinates: 52°09′31.25″N 23°21′8.85″E
- Construction started: 1832
- Completed: 1835

Cieleśnica Palace (Polish: Cieleśnica-Pałac) is a palace in the village of Cieleśnica, in Biała County, Lublin Voivodeship, in eastern Poland near the border with Belarus.

== History ==
=== Early history ===
Ownership records show the land on which the palace was eventually constructed were part of an estate owned by the Andruszkiewicz family during the 15th century. In 1526 the estate passed into the hands of the Cieleśnicki family who established a farm at the site and from whose name the present name of the site originates. In 1630 the farm was bought by Aleksander Ludwik Radziwiłł, a Polish-Lithuanian nobleman.

=== Construction of the palace ===
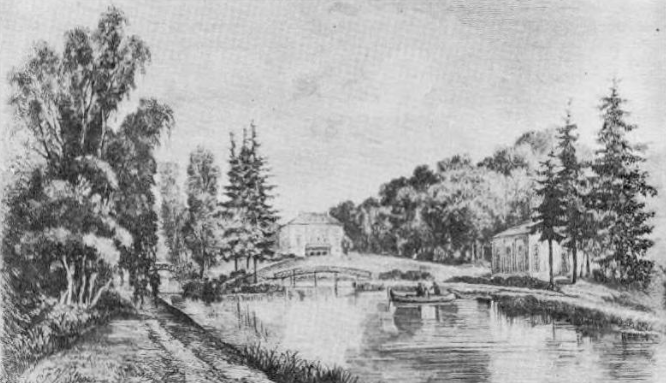
The palace at Cieleśnica, Poland, as it appeared in 1878

In 1810 the farm was sold by the Radziwiłłs to Andrzej Serwiński for 360,000 złoty. Serwiński, had been secretary to Michał Kazimierz Ogiński, the Grand Hetman of Lithuania, and had studied architecture in Italy, had inherited a fortune of 1,500 ducats in Ogiński's will. This, together with profits made from leasing the land of Michał Walicki, an associate from his travels around Europe who had been a functionary of the Polish Kingdom and was known as a researcher and philanthropist, enabled Serwiński to purchase the farm and have a palace constructed there.

The palace was constructed in Italian style, and furnished at the time of construction. An orangery and landscape garden were also created for the palace.

=== Modern history ===
In the 1880s the palace passed through marriage into the hands of the Rosenwerth-Rużyczka family (also called Różyczka de Rosenwerth) through a marriage of Maria Serwiński to Henryk Rosenwerth-Rużyczka, whose son Stanisław Rosenwerth-Rużyczka went on to own it. The palace was looted during the Second World War, and was nationalised under the communist regime in Poland. Under the communists the palace became "a place for creative work for architects and cultural workers" and also as entertainment facilities for the local state farm.

In 2009 the palace was sold by the local authorities to Barbara and Dariusz Chwesiuk, who opened a hotel there in 2013.
