= Żuki, Gmina Terespol =

Żuki
- Village
- Location within Poland
- Coordinates: 52°01′25″N 23°39′23″E
- Country: Poland
- Voivodeship: Lublin
- County: Biała
- Gmina: Terespol
- Time zone: UTC+1 (Central European Time)
- ISO 3166 code: POL

Żuki [ˈʐukʲi] is a village in the administrative district of Gmina Terespol, within Biała County, Lublin Voivodeship, in eastern Poland, close to the border with Belarus.
