= Pratulin =

- Village
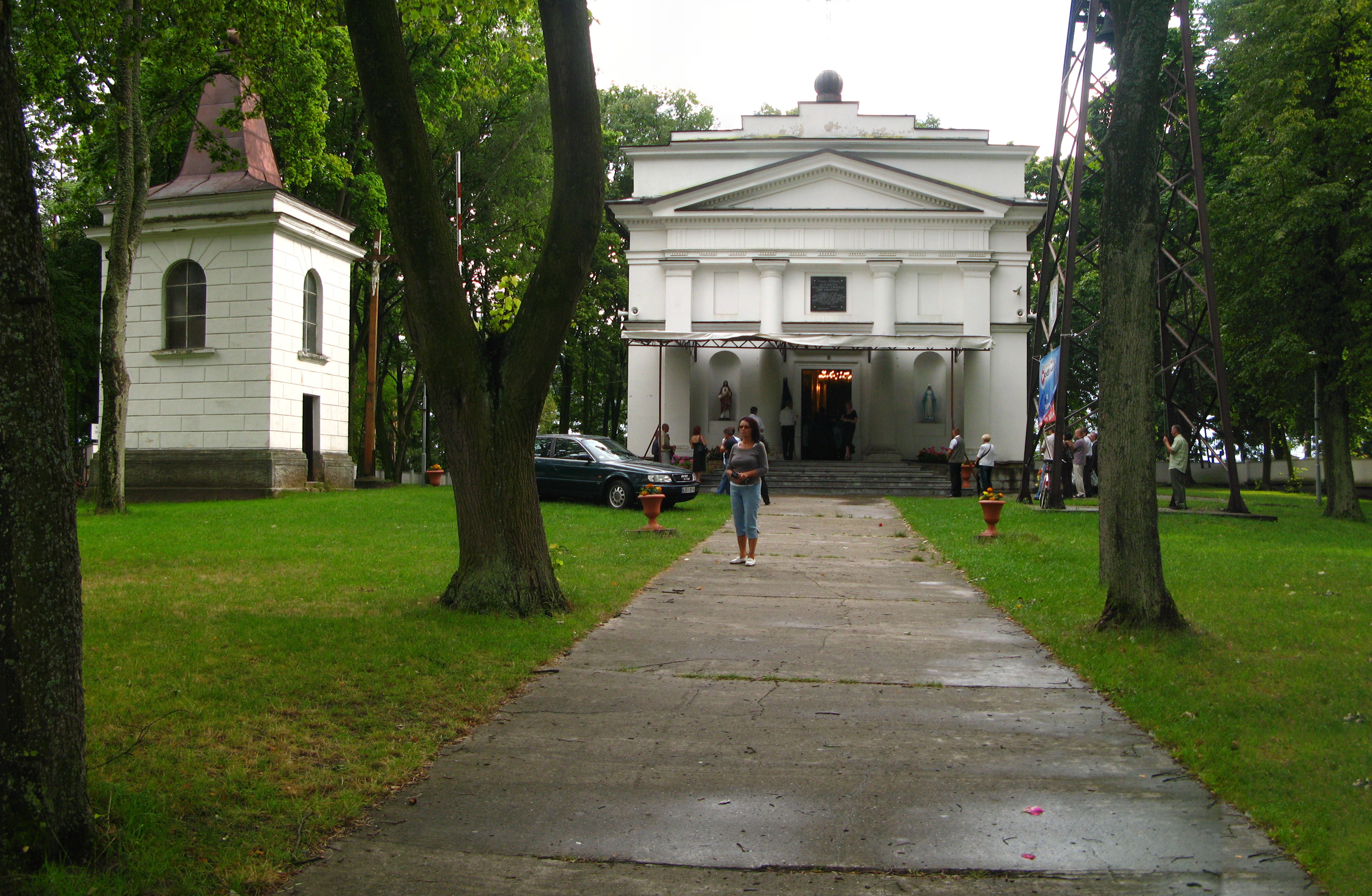
- Church of Saints Peter and Paul

- Location within Poland
- Coordinates: 52°10′N 23°26′E
- Country: Poland
- Voivodeship: Lublin
- County: Biała
- Gmina: Rokitno
- Time zone: UTC+1 (CET)
  - Summer (DST): UTC+2 (CEST)

Pratulin [praˈtulʲin] is a village in the administrative district of Gmina Rokitno, within Biała County, Lublin Voivodeship, in eastern Poland, close to the border with Belarus.

== History ==
On 24 January 1874 the Imperial Russian Army killed a group of 13 Greek Catholics in the village. They later became known as the Pratulin Martyrs.

During "Operation Barbarossa" the forest nearby was a staging point for the German 17th Panzer Division. At 3:30am on 22 June 1941 German Panzer and motorized troops decamped from this area, crossing the Bug River and attacking the Soviet Union. Eight Polish citizens were murdered by Nazi Germany in the village during World War II.
