= Chapel of the Resurrection, Terespol =

Orthodox chapel in Terespol, Poland

Chapel of the Resurrection
- Kaplica Zmartwychwstania Pańskiego
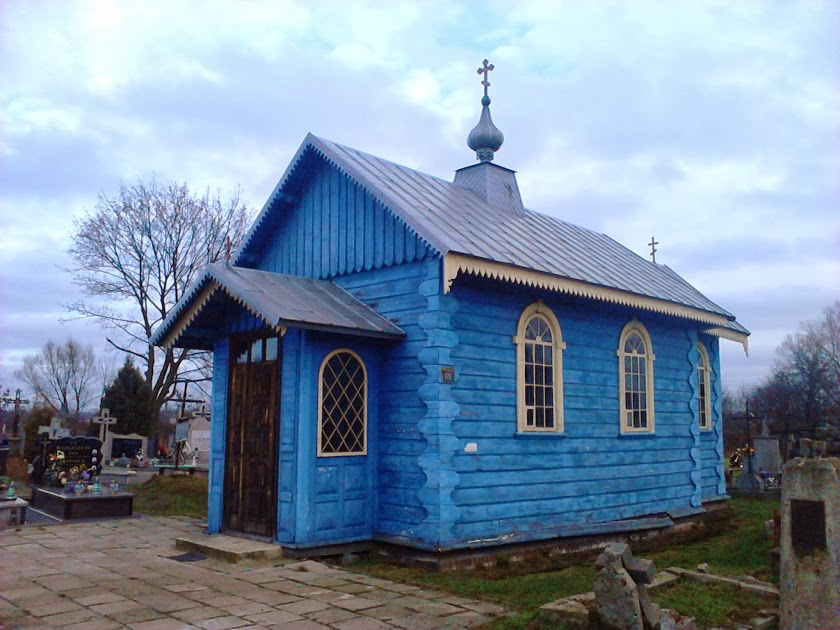
- Chapel of the Resurrection
- 52°04′34.9″N 23°37′25.7″E
- Location: Terespol
- Country: Poland
- Denomination: Eastern Orthodoxy
- Previous denomination: Eastern Orthodoxy (until 1926); Neouniate (1926–1941)
- Churchmanship: Polish Orthodox Church

History
- Status: active Orthodox church
- Dedication: Resurrection of Jesus
- Dedicated: May 31, 1892

Architecture
- Years built: 1892

Specifications
- Materials: wood

Administration
- Diocese: Diocese of Lublin and Chełm

The Chapel of the Resurrection is an Orthodox cemetery chapel (Note: The building is referred to as a chapel due to its small size and lack of parish church status. However, it is not a typical Orthodox Eukterion-chapel, as it contains all the elements necessary for the celebration of the Divine Liturgy (chancel with an altar table, a prothesis table, and an antimension).) in Terespol. It belongs to the Parish of St. John the Theologian in Terespol, which is part of the Terespol Deanery of the Diocese of Lublin and Chełm of the Polish Orthodox Church.

The chapel is located in the central part of the Terespol Orthodox Cemetery, at 176 Wojska Polskiego Street. The church was built in 1892 (some sources incorrectly state 1903). Since its inauguration, it has served as the cemetery chapel.

== History ==
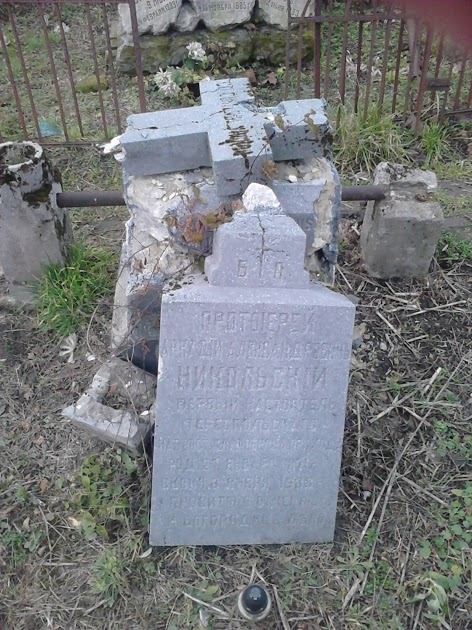
Destroyed grave of Father Arkadiusz Nikolsky

The structure was built in 1892. From its inception, it was intended to serve as an auxiliary church for the parish of St. John the Theologian in Terespol, designated for funeral services and prayers for the deceased. Its construction also played a role in promoting Orthodoxy among the resistant Uniates. Approximately 70% of the parishioners in Terespol did not reconcile with the forced conversion of all Uniates to Orthodoxy. These people, who were formally part of the Russian Orthodox Church since 1875, would not attend services at the church and only came for family funerals at the Terespol cemetery. The chapel's construction aimed to enable the Orthodox clergy to influence the resistant individuals. The investment had been planned since 1885, but it was only made possible by an anonymous Russian donor who contributed 5,121 rubles and 30 kopecks.

The dedication of the completed building took place on May 31 of the same year, presided over by Archbishop Flavian of Chełm and Warsaw, who was making a canonical visit to the Terespol parish. During the Divine Liturgy, the archbishop was assisted by the parish priests of Terespol, Kopytów, Kobylany, Neple, and Krzyczew, as well as clergy from the Basilica of the Birth of the Virgin Mary in Chełm. In the second part of the ceremony, Flavian held a memorial service in the chapel for all those buried in the Terespol cemetery. About 3,000 faithful and stationed Russian soldiers attended the ceremony.

The church was named the Chapel of the Resurrection from the beginning. However, some sources incorrectly state that the patronal feast of the church was initially the Feast of the Ascension. The Polish Art Monuments Catalog also inaccurately claims that the church is younger, having been completed and put into use only in 1903.

From its dedication in 1892 until 1926, the chapel served as an Orthodox church. It was then a Neouniate church for 15 years, and since 1941, it has once again been an Orthodox church. Throughout its history, it has been renovated three times – in 1930, 1970, and 2019.

In the vicinity of the building are the graves of clergy associated with Terespol, including Father Mikołaj Poleszczuk, born in the city and primarily serving in the Diocese of Wrocław and Szczecin, and Father Arkadiusz (Arkadij) Nikolsky, the local parson who converted to Uniates and subsequently led the parish as a Catholic priest of the Slavic rite.

The building was entered into the register of historic monuments on 30 June 2008 under number A/866.

== Architecture ==
The Chapel of the Resurrection is a wooden structure with a log construction and oriented design. The building is divided into three parts: a single rectangular nave, a narrower rectangular chancel, and a small church porch, which is also narrower than the nave. All windows are semi-circular and adorned with wooden frames. Decorative wavy-cut wooden applications are visible at the corners of the building. The chapel features a gabled roof covered with metal. An Orthodox cross is situated over the chancel and the church porch, while the nave is topped with a low octagonal turret and an onion-shaped dome, also crowned with a cross.

Inside the church, there was a single-row iconostasis made in an eclectic style at the turn of the 19th and 20th centuries. After a 2019 renovation, the iconostasis was replaced by two icons, and photographs of the church and cemetery are now on display. The iconostasis structure itself is awaiting further renovation. The 1892 dedication description also notes that the church originally housed four bells, a set of silver liturgical vessels, a large bronze chandelier, processional banners, and six sets of liturgical vestments.
