= Kopytów =

Kopytów may refer to the following places:

- Kopytów, Lublin Voivodeship, a village in Lublin Voivodeship, Poland
- Kopytów, Masovian Voivodeship, a village in Masovian Voivodeship, Poland
- Kopytov (Polish: Kopytów), a village and administrative part of the town of Bohumín, Czech Republic
