= Church of St. Nicholas, Zabłocie =

Orthodox church in Zabłocie, Poland

Church of St. Nicholas
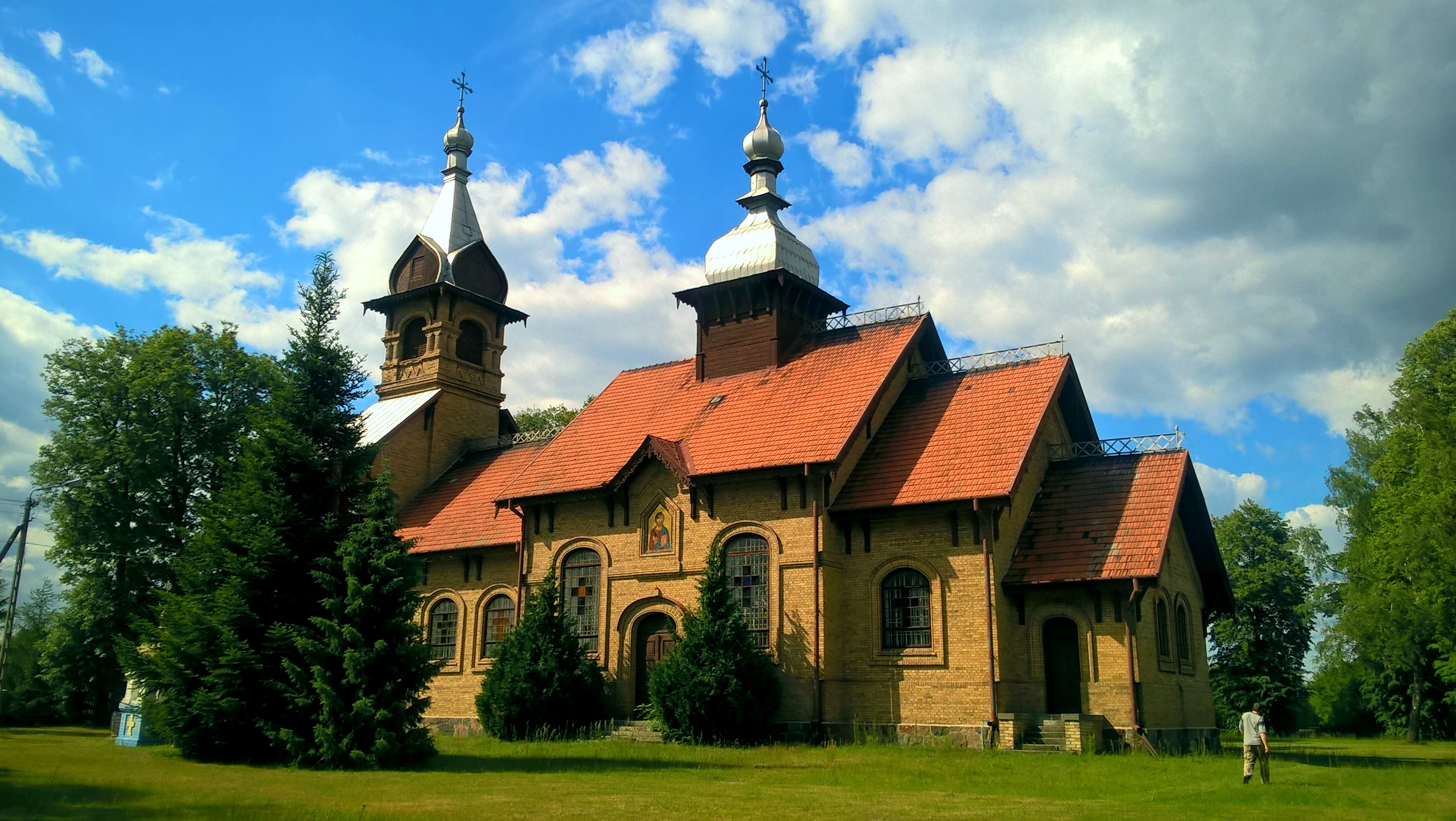
- View of the church from the south-eastern side
- Church of St. Nicholas
- 51°51′01.0″N 23°33′36.0″E
- Location: Zabłocie
- Country: Poland
- Denomination: Eastern Orthodoxy
- Churchmanship: Polish Orthodox Church

History
- Status: active Orthodox church
- Dedication: Saint Nicholas
- Dedicated: August 16, 1907

Architecture
- Architect: Vladimir Pokrowski
- Completed: 1907

Specifications
- Materials: brick

Administration
- Diocese: Diocese of Lublin and Chełm

The Church of St. Nicholas in Zabłocie, Gmina Kodeń is a historic church within the Polish Orthodox St. Nicholas Parish; this parish is part of the Terespol Deanery in the Diocese of Lublin and Chełm.

The first Eastern Orthodox church in Zabłocie existed before 1580. After the Union of Brest (1596), the church passed to the Uniate Church along with the entire Orthodox Eparchy of Chełm. It remained under the control of the Uniate parish until the Conversion of Chełm Eparchy in 1875, when it was handed over to the Russian Orthodox Church. This decision sparked protests from the local population.

From 1904 to 1907, a new brick church was built in Zabłocie, designed by the architect of the Warsaw Eparchy, Vladimir Pokrowski. The church did not serve religious functions between 1915 and 1918, as the Orthodox inhabitants of Zabłocie were sent into exile. During the Second Polish Republic, it became the seat of the parish. The church was closed again after Operation Vistula but resumed its religious activity in 1951 (officially in 1954).

The church is located in the center of the village.

== History ==
=== First church in Zabłocie ===
The first Orthodox church in Zabłocie must have been established before 1580, as it was first mentioned in sources that year. Icons dating from the first half of the 16th century, originating from this very church, have been preserved. The next mention of the parish church in Zabłocie dates back to 1668. By this time, it was already a Uniate church, as Dionysius Zbyruyskyy, the last Orthodox bishop of Chełm under the jurisdiction of the Patriarchate of Constantinople, joined the Uniate Church. This decision was extended to the entire administration, although not all pastoral locations accepted it. The Uniate church existing in the 17th century was built of wood. Nearby, there was a bell tower with a post-and-beam construction.

In 1875, the parish in Zabłocie transitioned to the Russian Orthodox Church as a result of the Conversion of Chełm Eparchy. According to eyewitness accounts, the transfer of the church to the Orthodox clergy was met with protests from the local Uniates, who attempted to prevent the new priests from entering the church. The pacification of the Uniates was carried out by the Russian military – three companies of the 5th Kyiv Grenadier Regiment.

=== Brick church ===
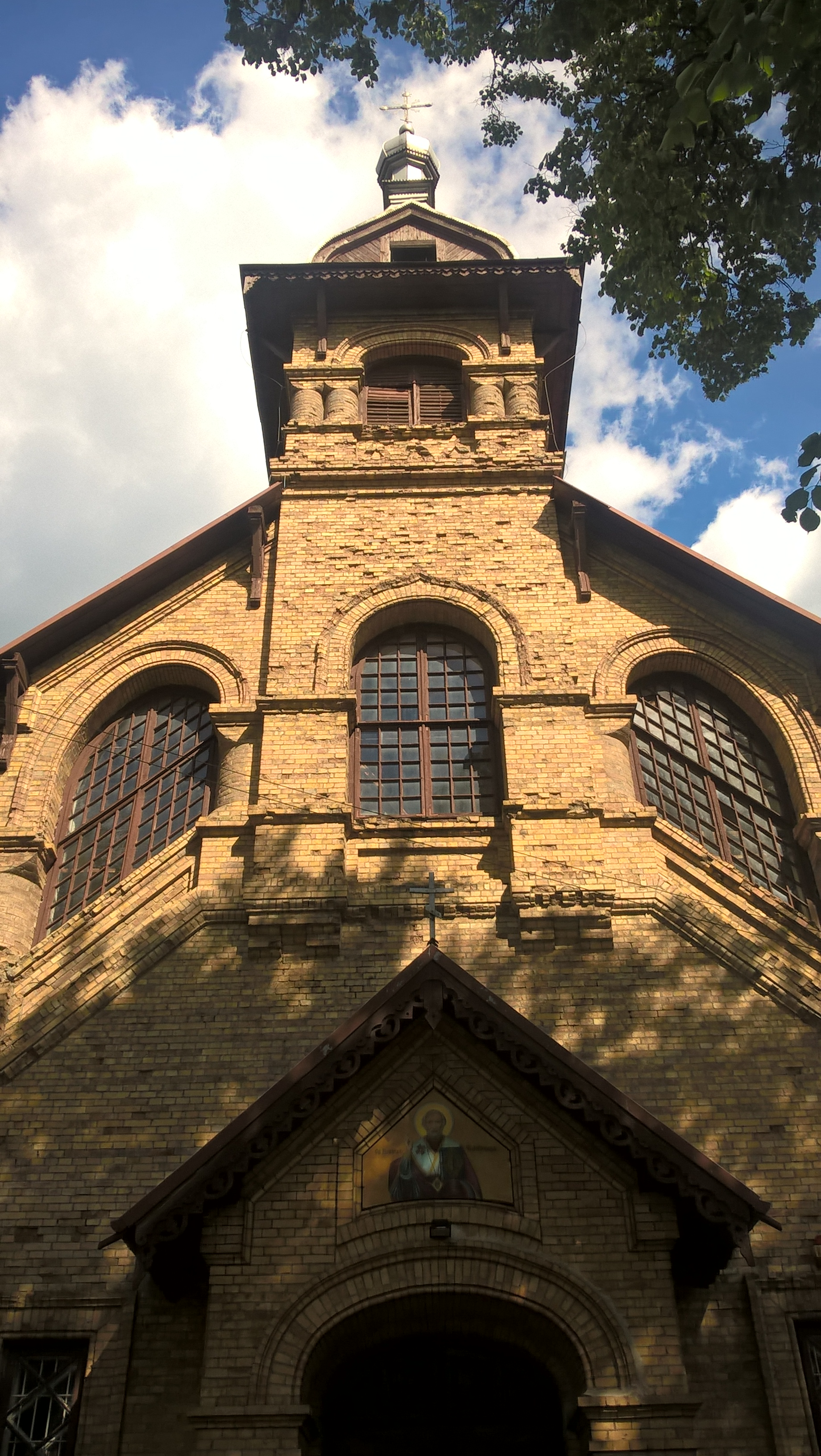
Building façade

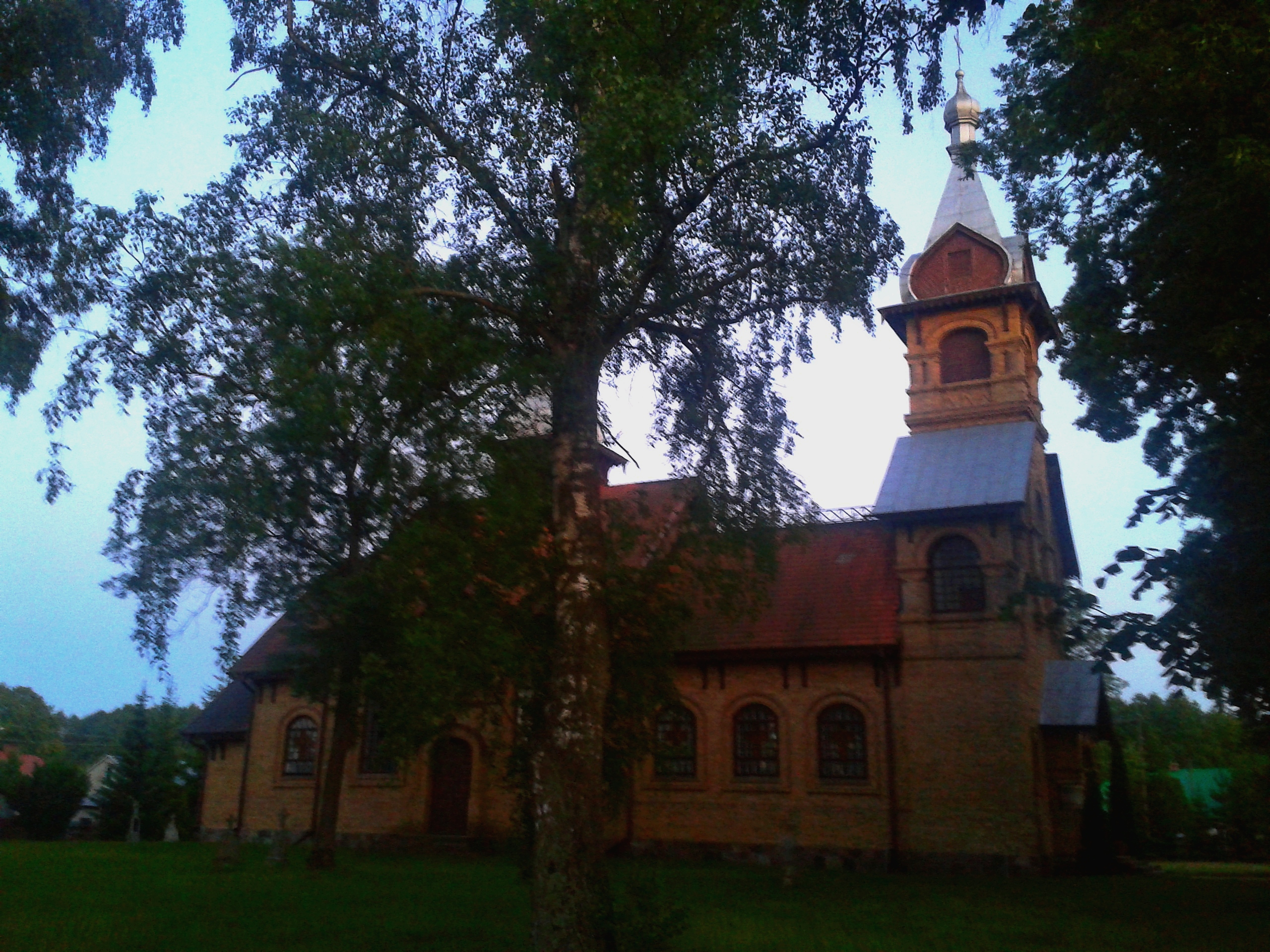
View from the north

Between 1904 and 1907, a new brick church was built for the parish in Zabłocie. The project was designed by the eparchial architect Vladimir Pokrowski, and the dedication of the completed building took place on 16 August 1907, performed by Bishop Eulogius of Chełm. The church was constructed with private donations (from Russian merchants) and contributions from the faithful, with the idea for the building coming from the parson, Father Kucharenko. Some sources suggest that before the construction of the brick church, the older wooden one had been destroyed. Just before World War I, the church in Zabłocie served as the seat of the largest rural parish in the Chełm eparchy, second only to the urban parishes of Chełm and Lublin in terms of the number of believers. It had 7,000 families under its care.

In 1915, when most of the Orthodox residents of Zabłocie fled to the east during the mass exile, the church was closed. It was opened occasionally for religious purposes when monks from the St. Onuphrius Monastery in Jabłeczna arrived to hold services for the few families that had not left. In 1919, the church was still not in regular use, and the Ministry of Religious Affairs and Public Education did not include it on the list of Orthodox churches in the Lublin Land slated to be reopened. However, this decision was later reversed, and in 1921, the building became the seat of a regular parish, part of the Biała Podlaska Deanery of the Diocese of Warsaw and Chełm. It was one of eight active churches in the deanery and one of four Orthodox churches in the Biała Podlaska County. From 1921 to 1923, the church in Zabłocie was a branch of the Church of St. Anna in Międzyleś, which was later closed and re-established as a separate parish in 1929.

In 1925, Bishop Henryk Przeździecki of Siedlce attempted to transfer the church in Zabłocie to a Neo-Uniate parish. He also tried to acquire churches in Kobylany and Kostomłoty. Some parishioners from Zabłocie did indeed join the Neo-Uniate Church, and in 1925, the parson himself joined the movement. To prevent the loss of the church, Bishop Antoni Marcenko visited Zabłocie in November of the same year. Ultimately, a Neo-Uniate parish was established in the village, but it was based in the 18th-century chapel at the local cemetery, not the Church of St. Nicholas.

During World War II, the church in Zabłocie became the seat of one of the 10 parishes that formed the Kodeń Deanery of the Diocese of Chełm and Podlachia. The church remained active until the deportation of the Orthodox Ukrainians during Operation Vistula in 1947. Just before the deportations, 2,788 people attended services at the church and the monastery church of St. Onuphrius in Jabłeczna. The parson at that time was Monk Eulogius from the Jabłeczna Monastery.

The church was reopened in 1951, without official government approval, and was served by monks from the Jabłeczna Monastery. The keys to the inactive church were kept by a parishioner, Anna Szepeluk, who later handed them over to Monk Atanazy Sienkiewicz. In 1954, the parish in Zabłocie was officially restored. In the 1960s, the number of people attending the church was estimated at around 800. At that time, it was one of the seven active churches in the Biała Podlaska County and was part of the Biała Podlaska Deanery of the Diocese of Warsaw and Bielsk.

In the 1970s, extensive renovation work was carried out on the church, including the restoration of the bell tower, which was covered with new metal roofing. In 1974, three new bells were purchased for the church. After the restoration work was completed, the building was re-dedicated by Metropolitan Bazyli of Warsaw and all Poland on 3 May 1980. In 1989, the roof covering was renewed, and four years later, frescoes inside the church were restored.

== Architecture ==
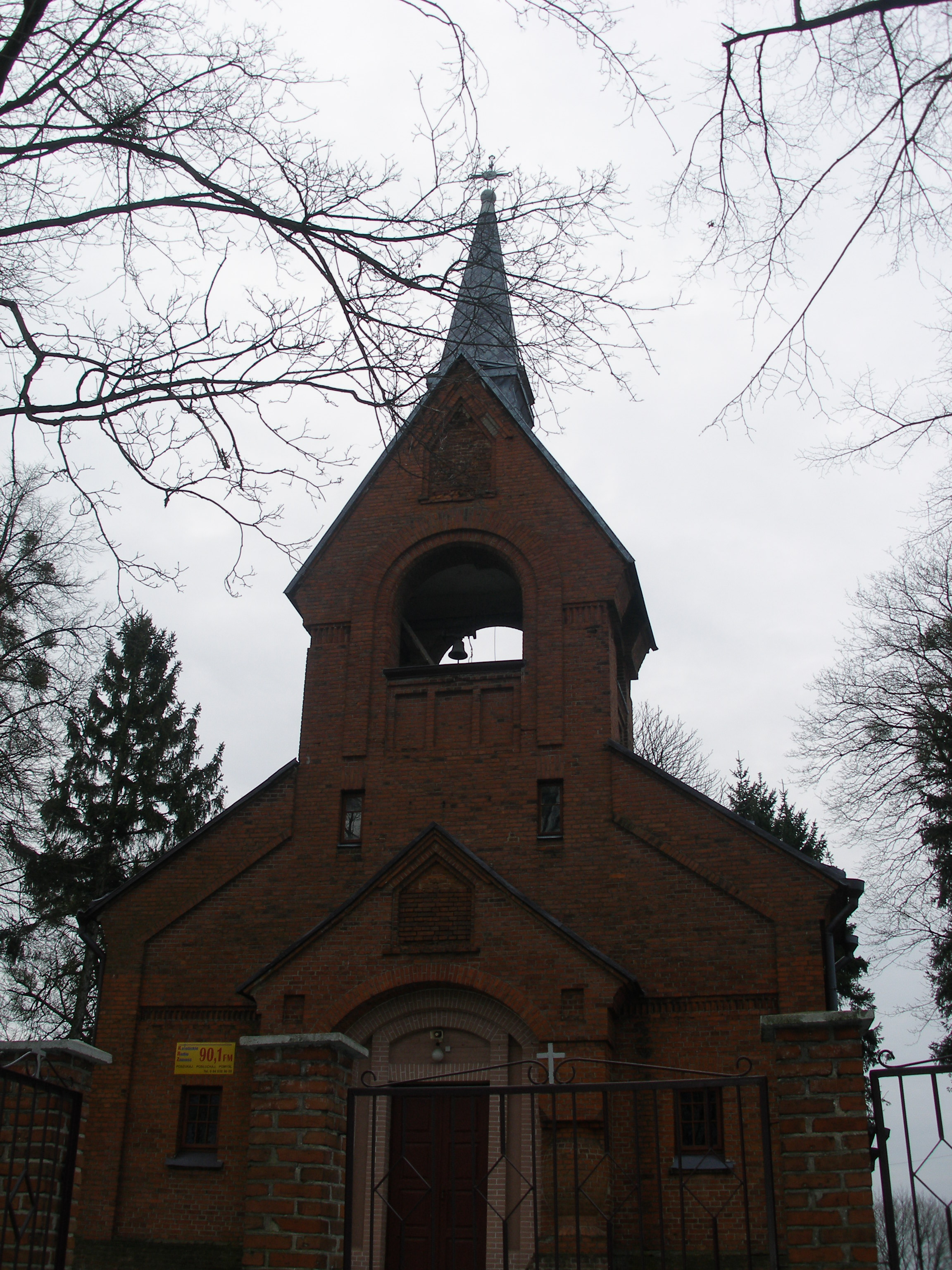
Former church in Łaziska, since 1947 a Catholic church. In the architecture of this temple, especially in the design of the bell tower, there are elements resembling the appearance of the church in Zabłocie

The church in Zabłocie was constructed from brick and follows a rectangular plan. Its architecture bears resemblance to Roman Catholic churches being built around the same period, but it also displays elements typical of Russian Revival architecture, the art of Podlachia, and wooden church buildings from the Russian North. The church is a single-nave, single-dome structure with a bell tower located above the church porch. The roof is covered with tiles. The building is divided into three parts, each placed along the longitudinal axis and covered with separate roofs. The chancel consists of two rectangular sections, the nave is square, and the church porch is rectangular. Above the nave, there is a square belfry topped with an onion dome. The bell tower is also crowned with an onion dome, set on a tented roof. The narrow bell tower, the thick columns at the entrance, and the decorative arch-shaped ornaments are elements borrowed from 19th-century Russian brick church architecture. The church in Zabłocie stands out from other Orthodox churches built in the Chełm Land in the first decade of the 20th century. Some features, such as the narrow bell tower and gabled roofs, can be seen in other regional churches from the same period, such as those in Mszanna, Łaziska, and Drelów.

The interior furnishings of the church date back to the 20th century. The wall paintings that decorate the interior were created in 1977. Inside the church, there is a historic two-tier iconostasis. The icons for the church were made by monks from the Trinity Lavra of St. Sergius. To the right of the royal doors is the Calvary, and to the left, in the iconostasis, is an icon of St. Seraphim of Sarov. Some of the furnishings come from the Church of St. Anna in Międzyleś, which was demolished in 1938 during the Polish Reclaimation and Polonization Action.

The church was entered into the register of monuments on 15 December 1988 under registration number A-171.

== Bibliography ==
- Urban, K. (1996). Kościół prawosławny w Polsce 1945–1970 [The Orthodox Church in Poland 1945–1970] (in Polish). Kraków: Nomos. ISBN 83-85527-35-4.
