= Zabłocie-Kolonia =

- Village
- Location within Poland
- Coordinates: 51°50′26″N 23°34′38″E
- Country: Poland
- Voivodeship: Lublin
- County: Biała
- Gmina: Kodeń

Zabłocie-Kolonia [zaˈbwɔt͡ɕɛ kɔˈlɔɲa] is a village in the administrative district of Gmina Kodeń, within Biała County, Lublin Voivodeship, in eastern Poland, close to the border with Belarus.
