= Kopytów-Kolonia =

- Village
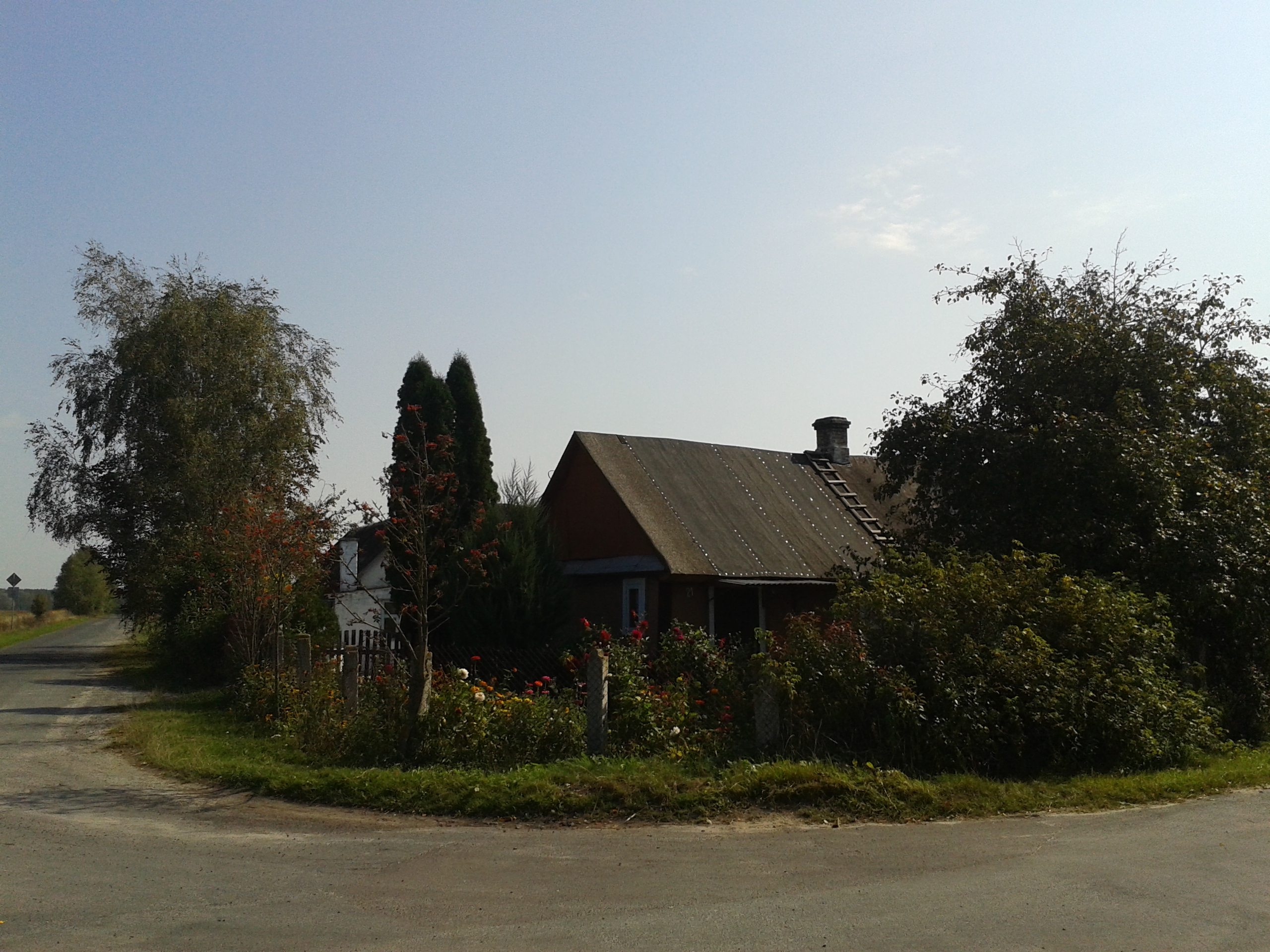

- Location within Poland
- Coordinates: 51°58′05″N 23°34′34″E
- Country: Poland
- Voivodeship: Lublin
- County: Biała
- Gmina: Kodeń

Kopytów-Kolonia [kɔˈpɨtuf kɔˈlɔɲa] is a village in the administrative district of Gmina Kodeń, within Biała County, Lublin Voivodeship, in eastern Poland, close to the border with Belarus.
