= Kąty, Gmina Kodeń =

Kąty
- Village
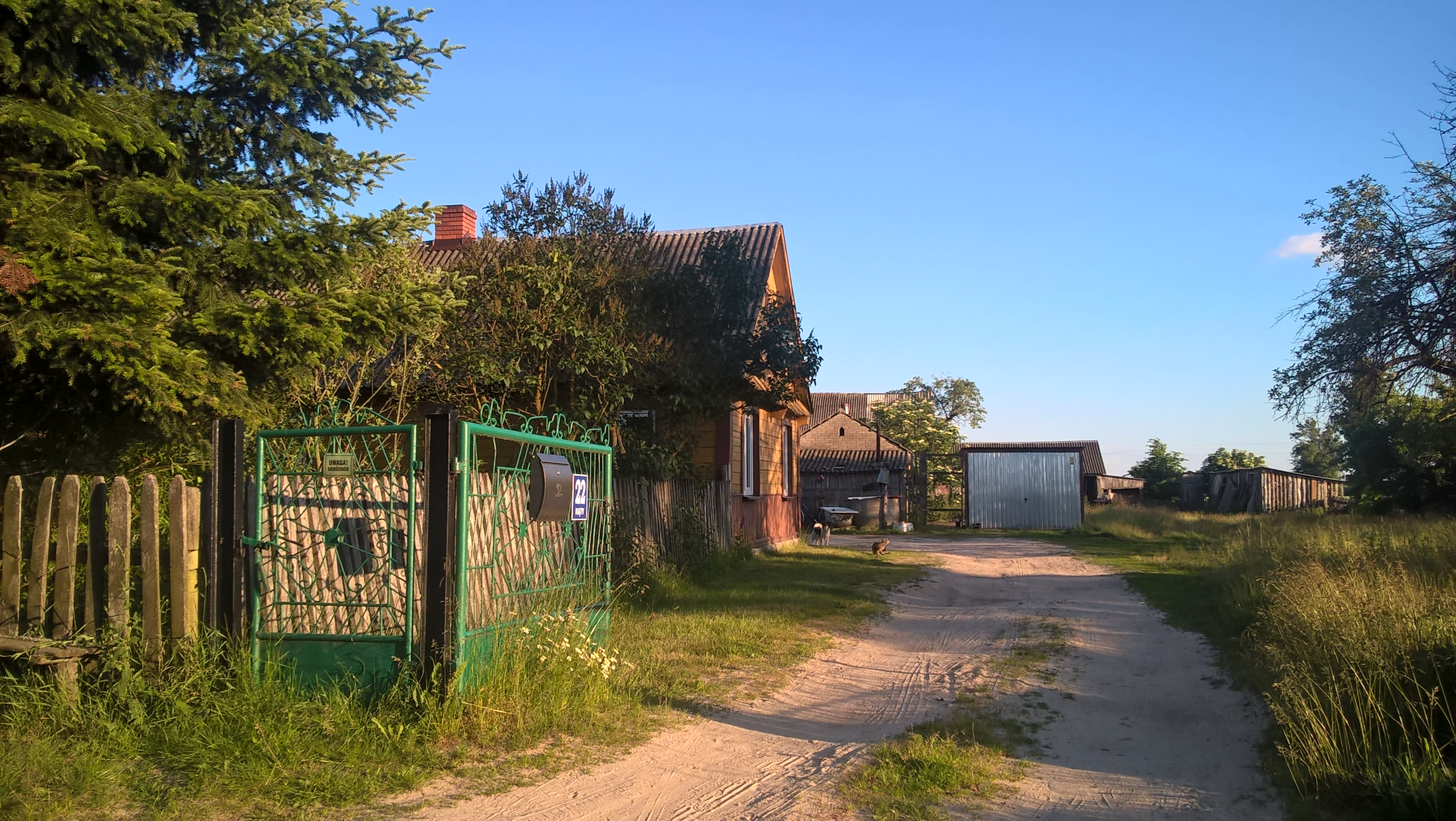

- Location within Poland
- Coordinates: 51°57′N 23°33′E
- Country: Poland
- Voivodeship: Lublin
- County: Biała
- Gmina: Kodeń

Kąty [ˈkɔntɨ] is a village in the administrative district of Gmina Kodeń, within Biała County, Lublin Voivodeship, in eastern Poland, close to the border with Belarus.
