= Church of Intercession of the Theotokos, Kobylany =

Orthodox church in Kobylany, Poland

Church of Intercession of the Theotokos
- Cerkiew Opieki Matki Bożej
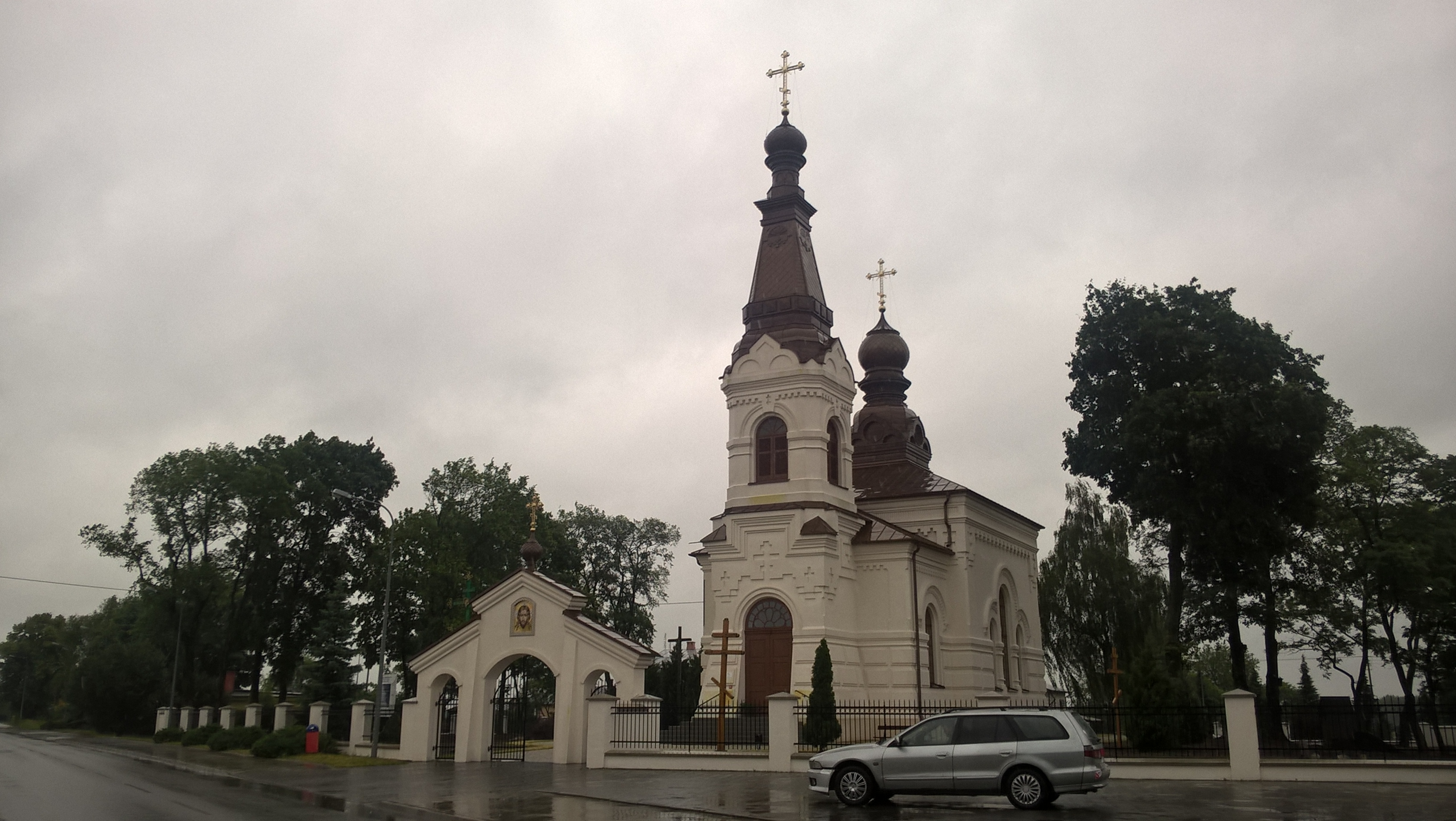
- Church in 2017
- Church of Intercession of the Theotokos
- 52°02′36.9″N 23°33′45.5″E
- Location: Kobylany
- Country: Poland
- Denomination: Eastern Orthodoxy
- Churchmanship: Polish Orthodox Church

History
- Status: active Orthodox church
- Founder: Victor Sychugov
- Dedication: Intercession of the Theotokos
- Dedicated: September 25, 1890; October 14, 2016; July 18, 2021

Architecture
- Style: Russian Revival
- Completed: 1890; 2016

Specifications
- Capacity: 400
- Materials: brick

Administration
- Diocese: Diocese of Lublin and Chełm

The Church of Intercession of the Theotokos is an Orthodox parish church in Kobylany. It belongs to the Terespol Deanery of the Diocese of Lublin and Chełm of the Polish Orthodox Church.

The church is located in the center of the village, at 65 Słoneczna Street.

The first Orthodox church in Kobylany was established before 1519, and by 1539 it had become the seat of a parish within the Chełm Eparchy. Like other pastoral centers of this eparchy, it accepted the Union of Brest, which occurred in 1620. In 1875, following the dissolution of the Uniate Chełm Eparchy, the church in Kobylany once again became an Orthodox place of worship. 15 years later, a new brick church was built on the site of the older religious building, designed by Victor Sychugov.

The church was inactive from 1917 to 1920, during which time its condition partially deteriorated. In the interwar period, the renovated building served as the seat of a registered, state-supported Orthodox parish. In 1927, the church was the subject of a dispute between Orthodox believers and followers of the Neo-Uniate movement but remained under the administration of its original owners, who continue to manage it. The interior of the church features historic 19th-century furnishings, either created for the church in Kobylany or transferred there from churches destroyed during the 1938 reversion campaign.

== History ==
=== First church in Kobylany ===
The earliest mention of the existence of an Orthodox church in Kobylany dates back to 1519. By 1539, this building was recorded as the seat of a parish of that denomination. Although the Chełm Eparchy, to which this church belonged, accepted the Union of Brest in 1596, the Kobylany parish did not recognize the Uniate jurisdiction for another 24 years. It wasn't until 1620 that the local church became Uniate while retaining its parish status.

A visitation protocol by the Uniate Bishop of Chełm in 1726 describes the church as "old", without specifying its exact age. The document notes that the church was built by the parishioners themselves from pine wood. It was a tripartite structure with a bell tower above the church porch, covered with shingles, and topped with two crosses. The building's condition was assessed as poor, with emphasis on the progressing rot of the wood from which the church was constructed. At the beginning of the 19th century, the church served 904 believers.

The church in Kobylany reverted to Orthodox ownership following the dissolution of the Uniate Chełm Eparchy in 1875. It continued to serve as a parish seat and was now part of the Lublin vicariate of the Diocese of Warsaw and Chełm, which included all the pastoral centers taken over by the Russian Orthodox Church from the Uniates. A few years before the dissolution of the Chełm Eparchy, the Uniate church in Kobylany served 817 parishioners. In 1886, the Kobylany church was provisionally renovated by local parishioners. During this renovation, the structure of its walls and roof was reinforced, and modest interior decorations were added. In the 1880s, the church received around 600 rubles from Moscow merchants.

=== Brick church ===
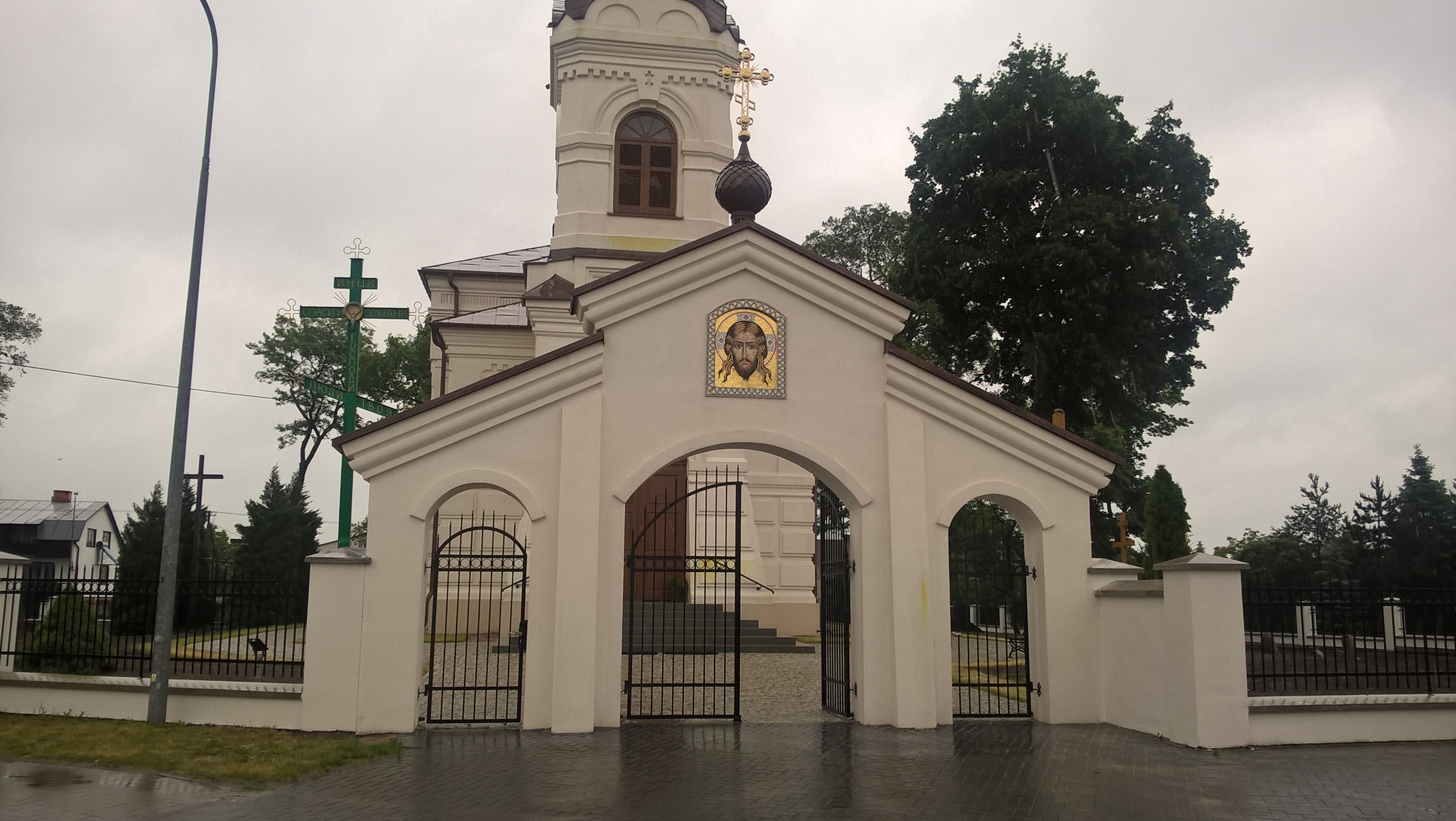
Entrance gate to the church grounds

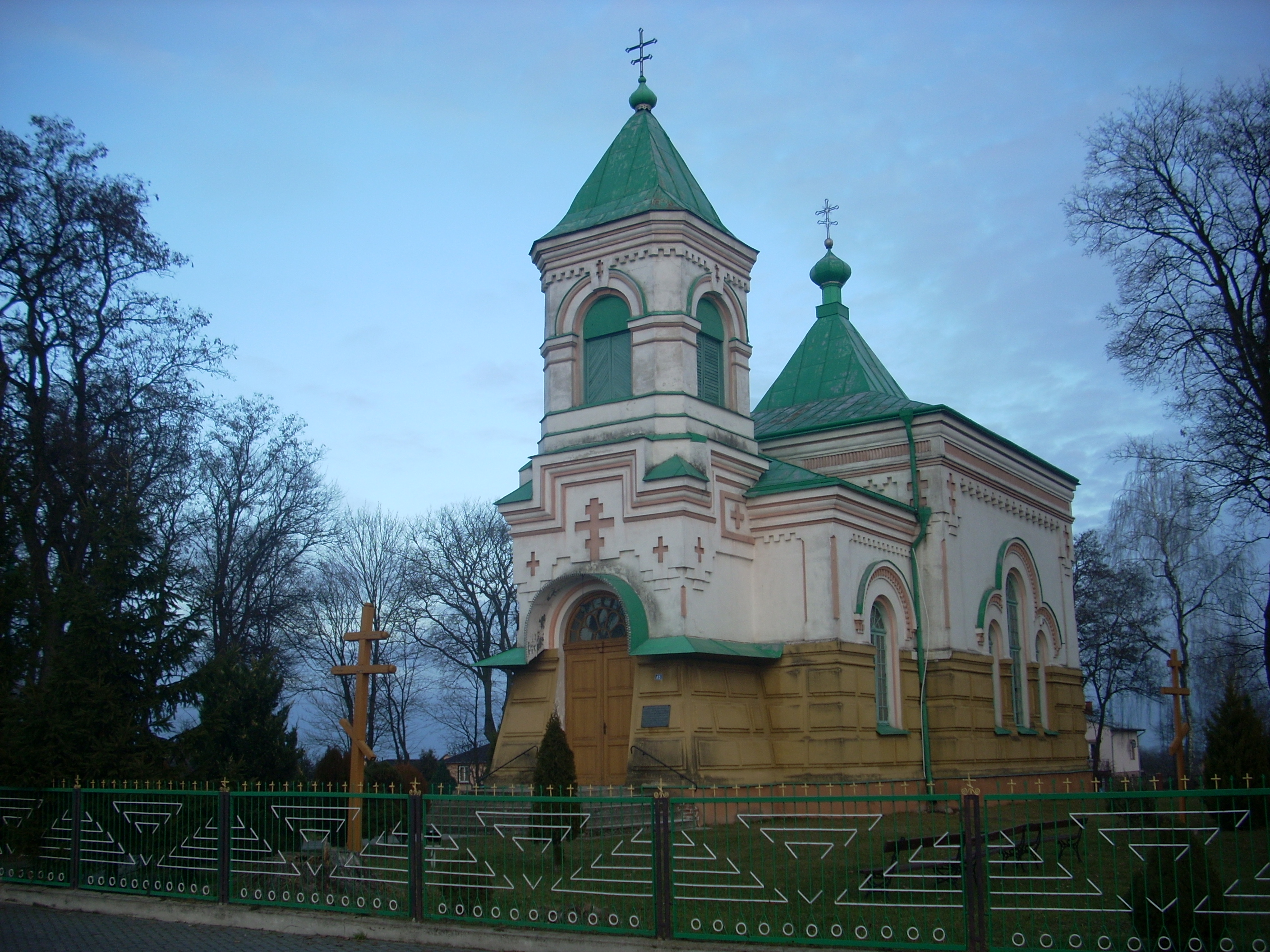
View of the church before renovation

In 1890, a new church was constructed for the Kobylany parish, this time made of brick. The building was designed by architect Victor Sychugov, a member of the Imperial Academy of Arts. Sychugov was also responsible for several other Orthodox church designs erected after the dissolution of the Uniate Chełm Eparchy, replacing older churches. The construction of the church was funded by the state from a fund dedicated to building new churches. The building was dedicated on 25 September 1890 by Bishop Flavian of Lublin. In 1875, a new cemetery was also established adjacent to the church. By 1898, the parish in Kobylany had 1,284 members. In the same year, the church was visited by Bishop Tikhon of Lublin during a canonical visitation; Tikhon later became the Patriarch of Moscow and all Russia.

In 1915, the Orthodox population of Kobylany was listed for evacuation, but ultimately only Russian officials, military personnel, and the local Orthodox priest with his family left. The church remained in operation for two more years, served by a monk from the St. Onuphrius Monastery in Jabłeczna. In 1917, the church was abandoned and converted into a latrine, and during the Polish–Soviet War, a Soviet unit used it as a stable. Despite this, in 1919, the church was registered as the seat of a parish, one of three active Orthodox churches in Biała County. In 1921, the Ministry of Religious Affairs and Public Education of Poland confirmed the legality of the church in Kobylany and its filial church in Horbów. A report by the Biała County governor described the church as being in average technical condition at that time, requiring "refreshing" inside, roof repairs, and the reconstruction of damaged towers. Regular services resumed in the church in 1924. At that time, it was one of four active churches in Biała County and one of eight in the Biała Deanery of the Diocese of Warsaw and Chełm.

The church in Kobylany, alongside the church in Kostomłoty, was planned by Bishop Henryk Przeździecki of Siedlce to become the seat of a Neo-Uniate parish. In both locations, riots broke out as Neo-Uniates sought to take over the churches and their furnishings, while the Orthodox believers resisted. To prevent the loss of the church, Orthodox Metropolitan Dionysius of Warsaw and all Poland personally visited the church in June 1927. During the visit, a preacher accompanying him delivered a sermon in which he severely criticized the state's religious policy, the Catholic hierarchy's attitude toward Orthodoxy, and the Neo-Uniate movement itself. Despite this, the parish priest in Kobylany joined the Neo-Uniate Church (according to Grzegorz Pelica, primarily for material reasons). The ministry then refused to register a new priest appointed by the metropolitan as the administrator of the parish. However, the church remained under Orthodox control. When the authorities refused to register the new parson, Metropolitan Dionysius sent Monk Nifont from the Jabłeczna monastery to Kobylany, and when local authorities deemed his activities illegal (as the priest was not registered as a salaried clergy member), Hieromonk Pancratius from the Pochaiv Lavra was sent. Ultimately, in 1927, the church was once again served by a salaried parish priest.

During the campaign to reclaim Orthodox churches, the church in Kobylany was never at risk of destruction. In 1938, after more than 100 Orthodox churches in the Chełm Land were demolished, parts of the furnishings from the dismantled churches were brought to the Kobylany church (some ended up in private homes).

The church remained continuously active during World War II and the post-war years. The building was renovated in the 1980s (including the restoration of the iconostasis), and again in the early 21st century. In 2013, the Diocese of Lublin and Chełm received a grant for another renovation. The renovation, completed by 2016, included renewing the roof (altering the domes and bell tower), the façade (including the mosaic on the external wall of the chancel depicting the Mother of God), insulating the foundation walls, refurbishing the floors, interior walls, and woodwork, and repainting the entire building in white. After the renovation was completed, the church was solemnly dedicated on 14 October 2016 by Archbishop Abel of Lublin and Chełm. In 2017, the Provincial Conservator of Monuments in Lublin awarded the church the Conservator's Laurel (for the best-restored monument of the year). After the interior renovations were completed, the church was dedicated by Archbishop Abel on 18 July 2021.

== Architecture ==
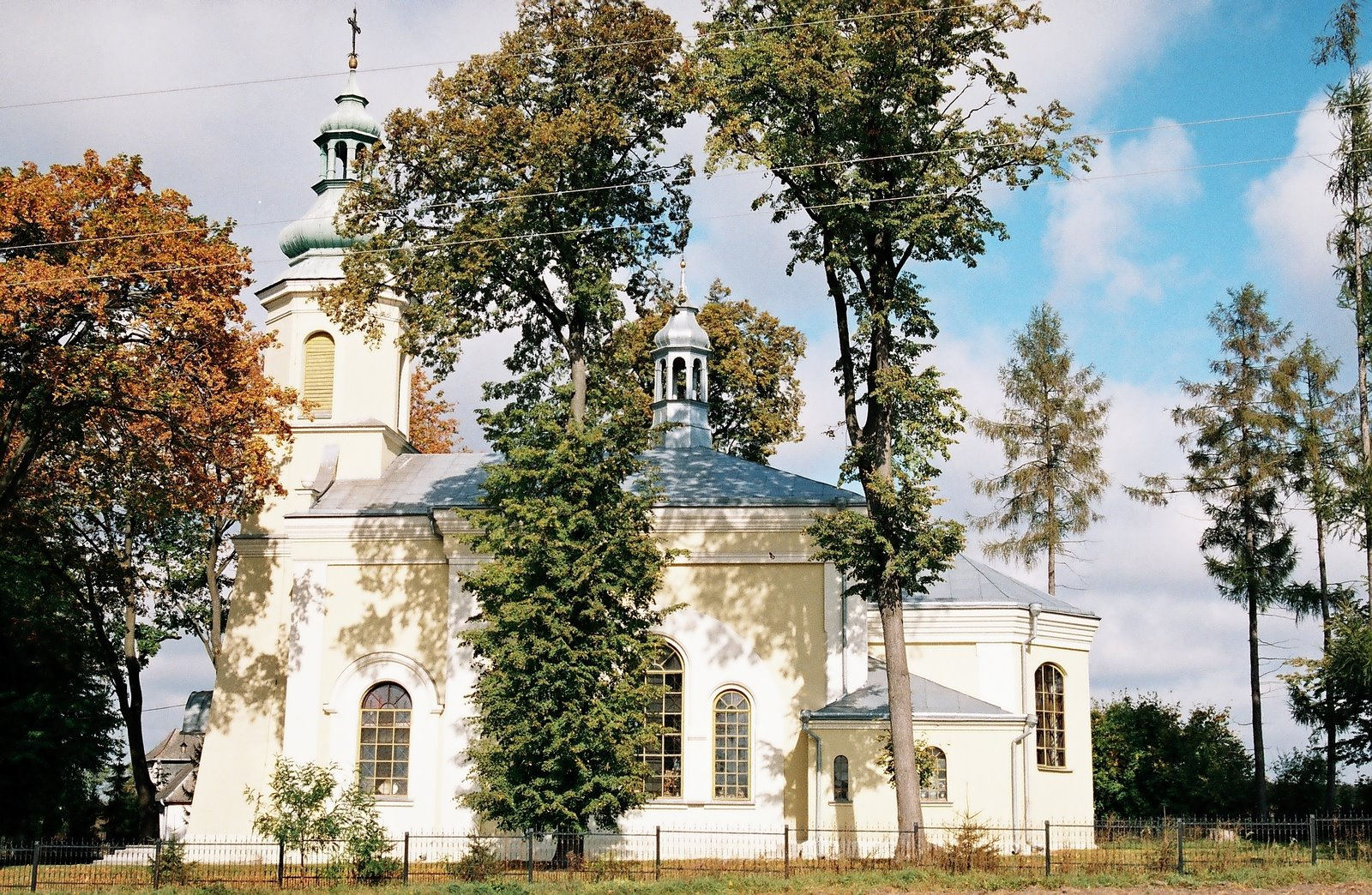
The church in Tarnawatka, which was adapted into a Catholic church after 1915 and underwent significant reconstruction, was originally built according to a plan similar to that of the church in Kobylany

The Kobylany church is an example of Russian Revival style architecture. It is tripartite in structure. The nave is square in plan and is topped with a four-pitched roof, crowned by a single onion-shaped dome. The church porch is rectangular in plan, with a bell tower rising above it, capped with a tented roof topped by a small dome of a similar shape. The chancel of the church is polygonal in shape.

The Kobylany church belongs to a group of 11 churches that were designed by Viktor Sychugov for parishes in the Chełm Land during the 1880s and 1890s. The church in Tarnawatka is the closest in form to the church in Kobylany. Both churches stand out among Sychugov's other designs due to their larger bell towers and church porches, as well as their nearly square naves. To enhance the sense of monumentality, the architect incorporated plastic bossage at the base and decorative cornices. The church is designed to accommodate 400 worshippers simultaneously.

The church's furnishings are mostly from the 19th century. The iconostasis is two-tiered.

Adjacent to the church are two wooden crosses and a metal cross that was knocked off the tower between 1917 and 1920.

The church was listed in the register of historic monuments on 18 November 1997 under the number A-283.

== Bibliography ==
- Pelica, Grzegorz Jacek (2007). Kościół prawosławny w województwie lubelskim (1918–1939) (in Polish). Lublin: Fundacja Dialog Narodów. ISBN 978-83-925882-0-7.
- Cynalewska-Kuczma, K. (2004). Architektura cerkiewna Królestwa Polskiego narzędziem integracji z Imperium Rosyjskim (in Polish). Poznań: Wydawnictwo Naukowe Uniwersytetu Adama Mickiewicza. ISBN 83-232-1463-8.
