= Kodeń =

- Village
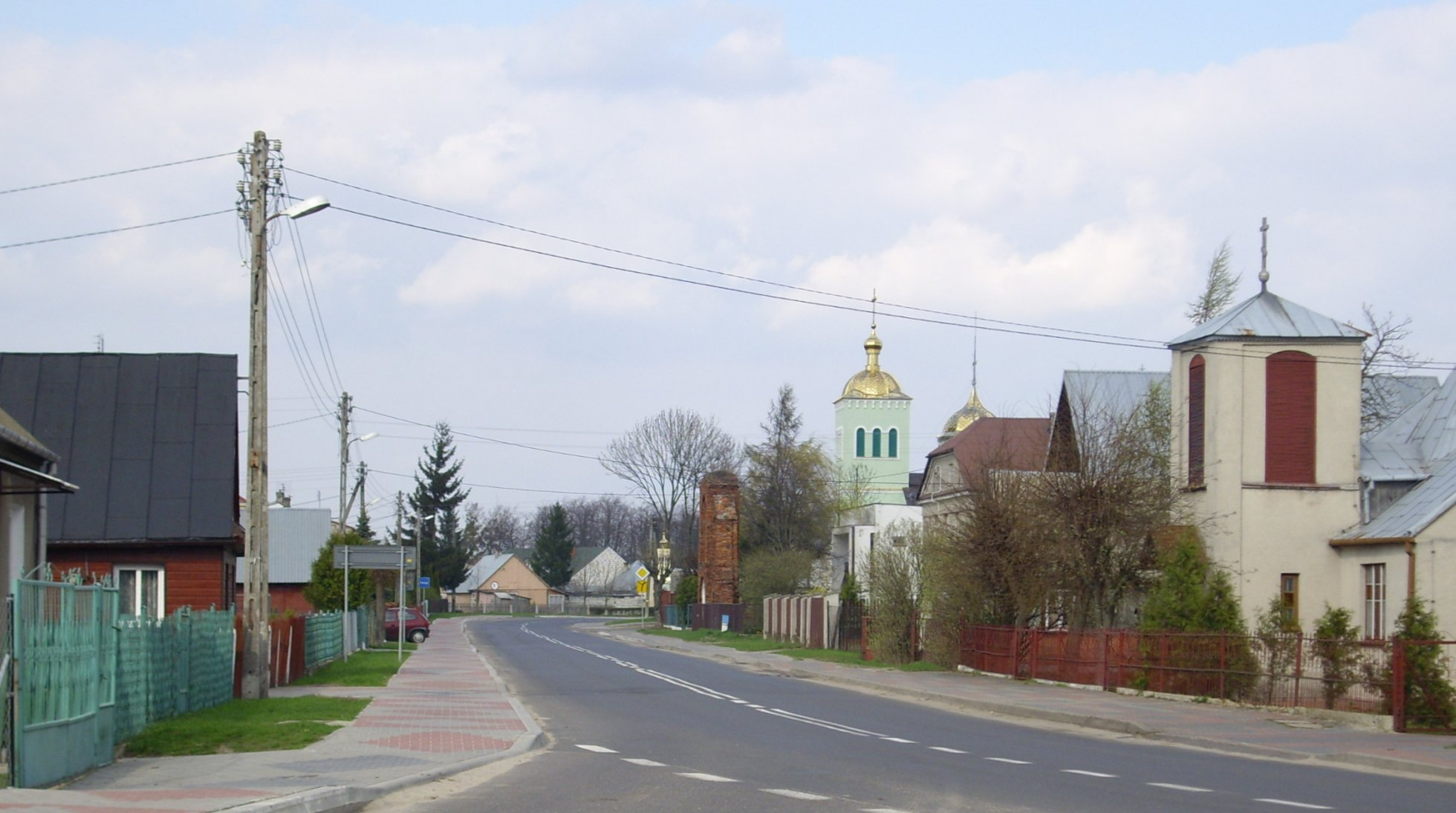

- Location within Poland
- Coordinates: 51°54′N 23°36′E
- Country: Poland
- Voivodeship: Lublin
- County: Biała
- Gmina: Kodeń

Population
  - Total: 1,900

Kodeń [ˈkɔdɛɲ] is a village in eastern Poland on the Bug River, which forms the border between Poland and Belarus. Administratively, it belongs to Biała County in Lublin Voivodeship. It is the seat of the gmina (administrative district) called Gmina Kodeń. It has approximately 1,580 inhabitants (as of 2021). The village is the site of a famous Marian shrine.

== History ==
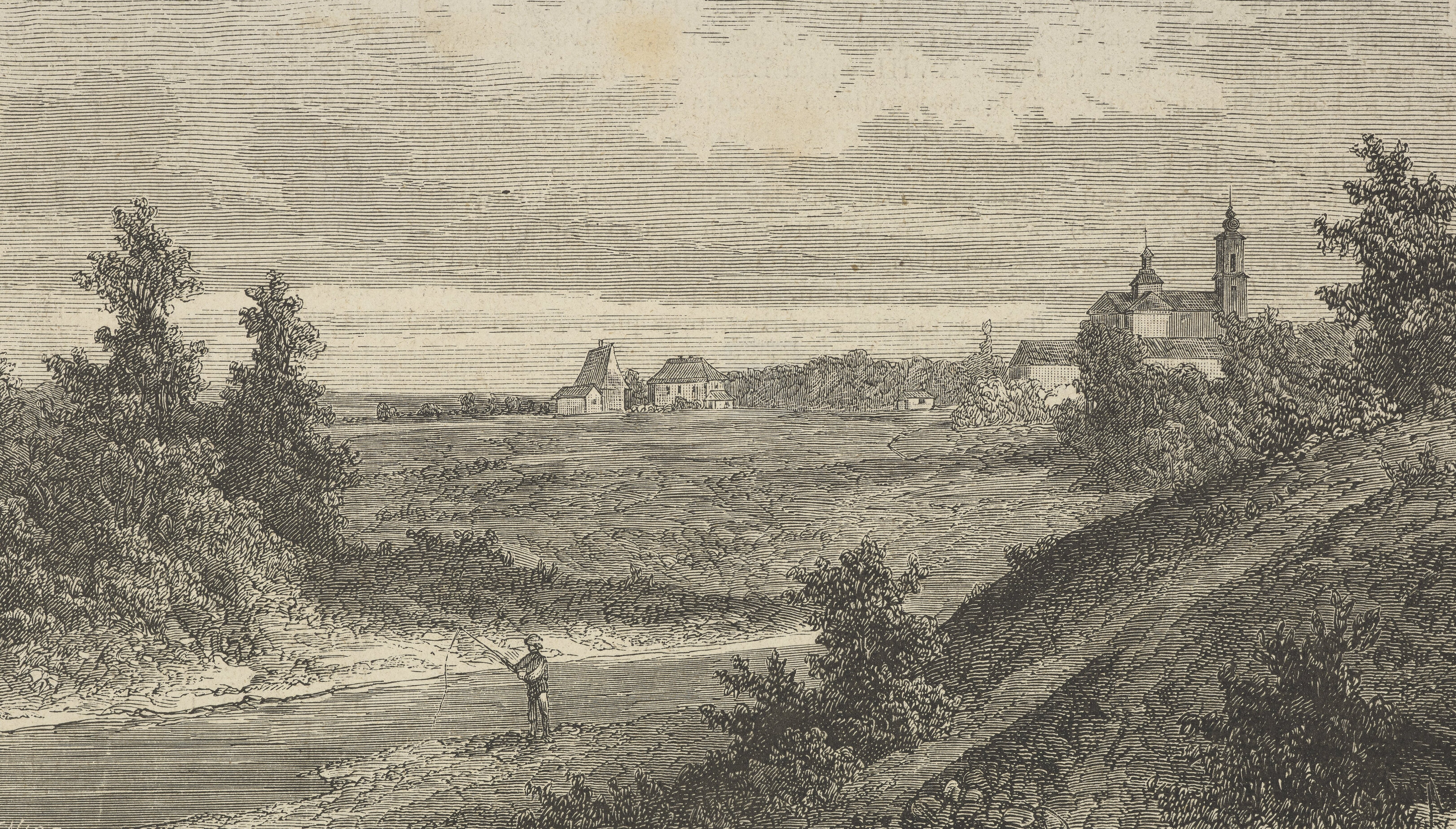
Kodeń, 1872

The first written mention comes from the 16th century, stating a settlement existed at the same site a century earlier. The settlement was purchased by Jan Sapieha, who fortified it and in 1511 established a town of Magdeburg law. In 1513, Jan Sapieha became voivode of the newly founded Lithuanian voivodeship of Podlaskie. In 1569, the Grand Duchy of Lithuania merged with Poland through the Union of Lublin, and by the Union of Brest of 1596, the Orthodox church of Lithuania acknowledged the authority of the pope, that way becoming “Uniate” or Greek Catholic.

With the Third Partition of Poland in 1795, Kodeń came under Austrian rule. During Napoleon's French hegemony, it became part of the Duchy of Warsaw. That way, by the decisions of the Congress of Vienna, it was a place in Congress Poland since 1815, under Russian rule for first in personal union, after 1831 as a part of Russia. In 1869 the town was stripped of its city rights.

After the end of World War I, it lay in the disputed area between the establishing Second Polish Republic and the Ukrainian People's Republic, proclaimed in January 1918, but also claimed by Soviet Russia. With the Peace of Riga in 1921, Kodeń definitively became part of the Polish Republic. During the German occupation in World War II, it lay in the General Government. Most of the Jewish population in Kodeń (pronounced "KUD-na" by the Jewish people) was wiped out by the Nazis in WWII, the Jewish cemeteries were used to create roads for Nazi vehicles.

== Points of interest ==
=== Our Lady of Kodeń in St-Anne Basilica ===
In the 17th century the fourth owner of Kodeń, Mikołaj Sapieha, returned to his home town with a painted icon portraying the Spanish statue of Our Lady of Guadalupe, said to have been painted by Archbishop Augustine of Canterbury at the request of then-Pope Gregory. It was placed in Saint-Anne's Catholic parish Church, built 1629–1635.

According to local legend, Sapieha stole the image from Pope Urban VIII in 1630 and was subsequently excommunicated. However, afterwards the pope lifted the excommunication and gave the icon along with many relics to the basilica in Kodeń in recognition of Sapieha's efforts in opposing the proposed marriage of King Władysław IV Vasa and Princess Elisabeth of the Palatinate. There are no documents confirming those events and most likely the icon was simply purchased during a pilgrimage to Spain. The icon was crowned in 1723 by the bishop Stefan Rupniewski with crowns conferred by Pope Innocent XIII.

Under Russian rule, with the liquidation of the Union of Brest on 6 May 1875, Saint Anne's Church was converted to Orthodox denomination, and Catholic clergy took the icon to Poland's greatest Marian shrine in Jasna Góra. In 1905, following a weakening of the Russian rule, the church was returned to Catholicism. After Poland had regained independence in 1919, the parish was reestablished. In 1927 Missionary Oblates of Mary Immaculate settled in Kodeń and restored the church, and the icon was returned after 52 years. In 1973, the church of St. Anne was granted the status of a minor basilica by Pope Paul VI.

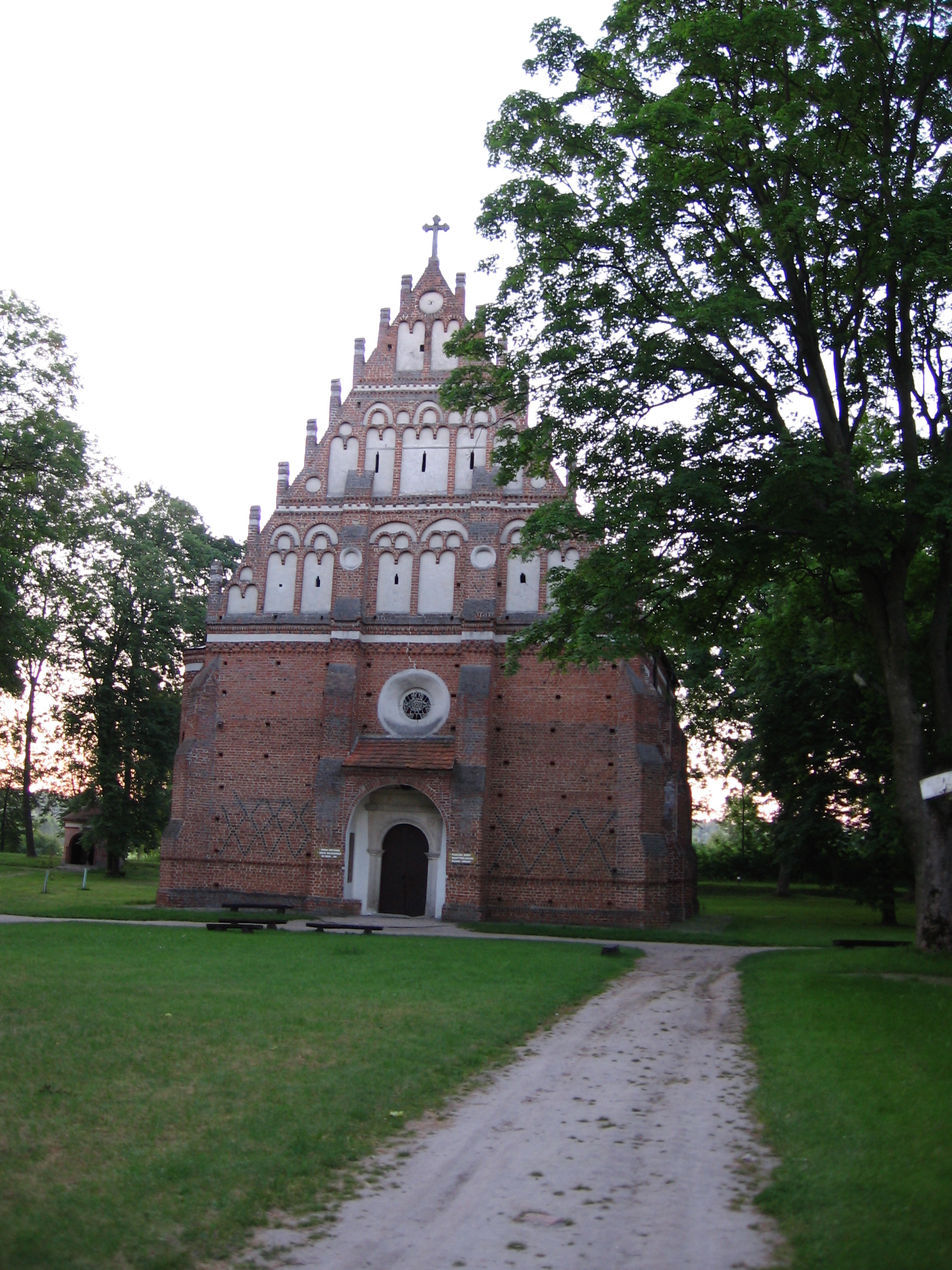
Catholic Church of the Holy Ghost, originally Orthodox

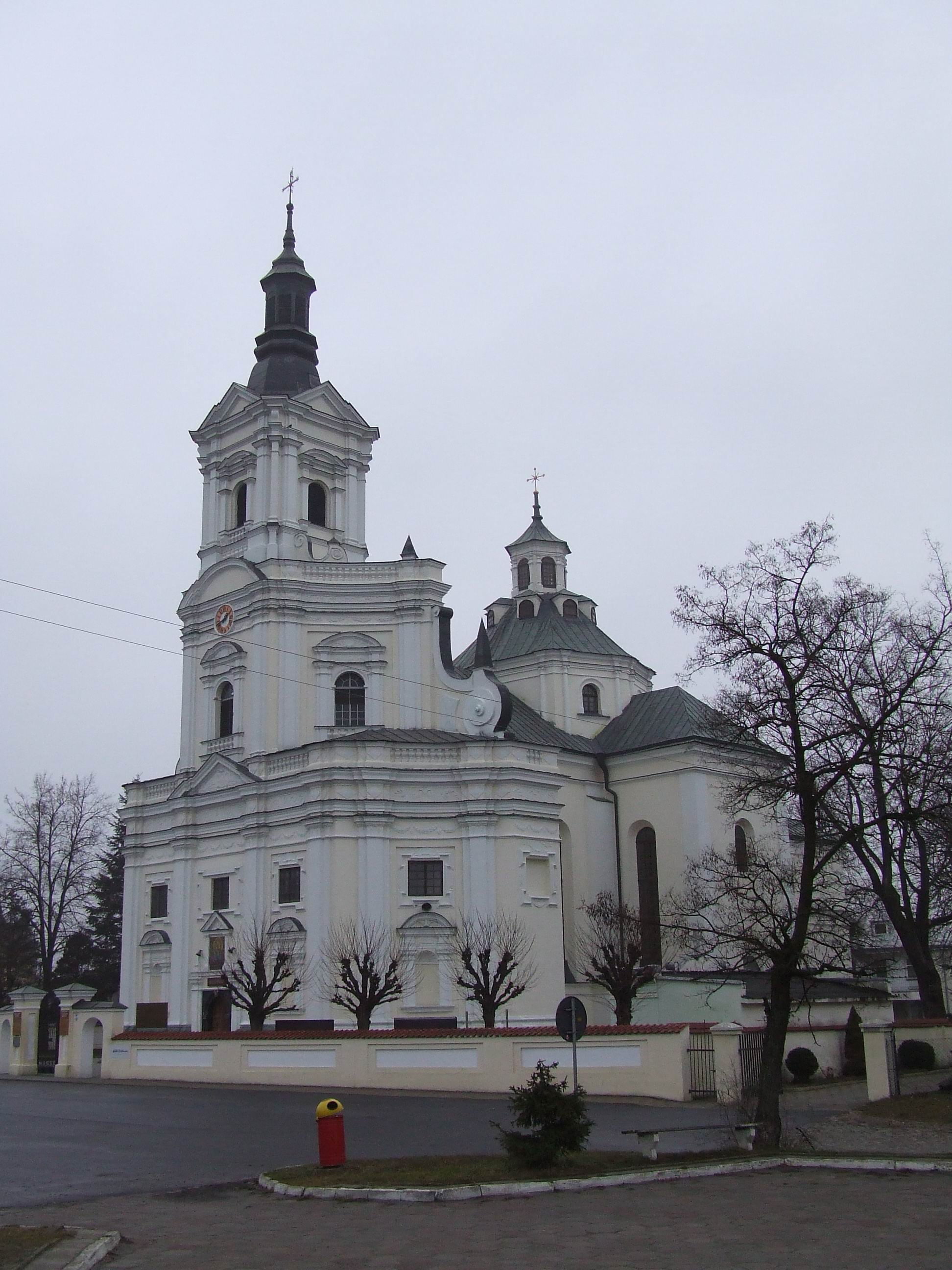
St-Anne's Basilica

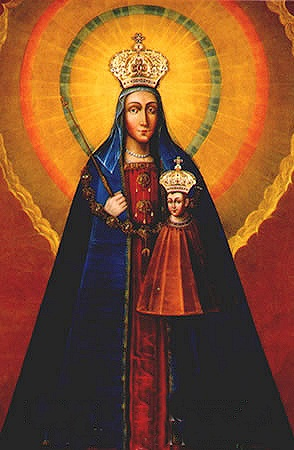
Mother of God of Kodeń

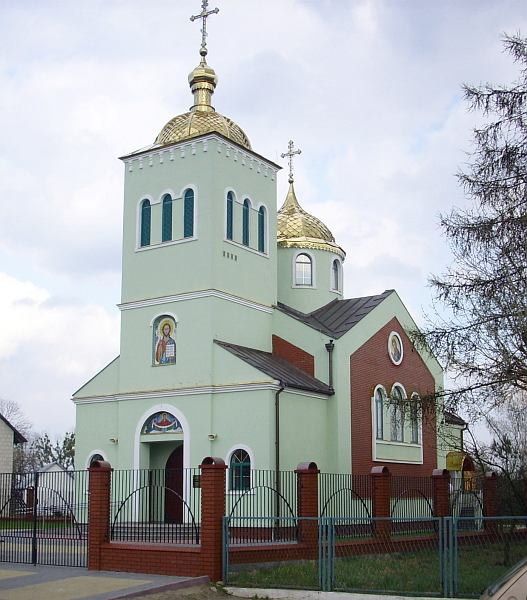
present Orthodox St-Michael's Church

=== Church of the Holy Ghost ===
The Church of the Holy Ghost, built in 1530 as the chapel of Sapieha Palace, is an example of Belarusian Gothic, a style comprising elements of Gothic and Renaissance. Originally it was Orthodox, since 1596Greek Catholic, but in the 1960s it was adopted as a filial church of the Roman Catholic parish.

=== Other sites ===
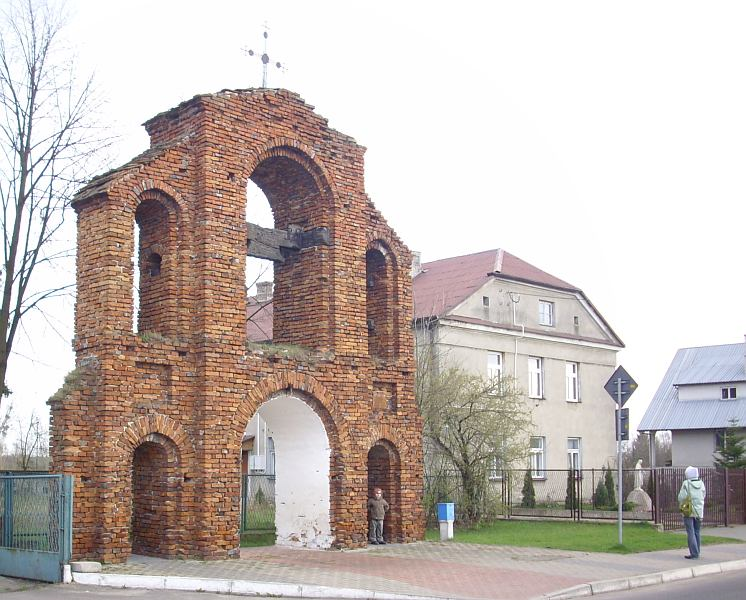
Gable of the ancient Uniate St-Michael's Church

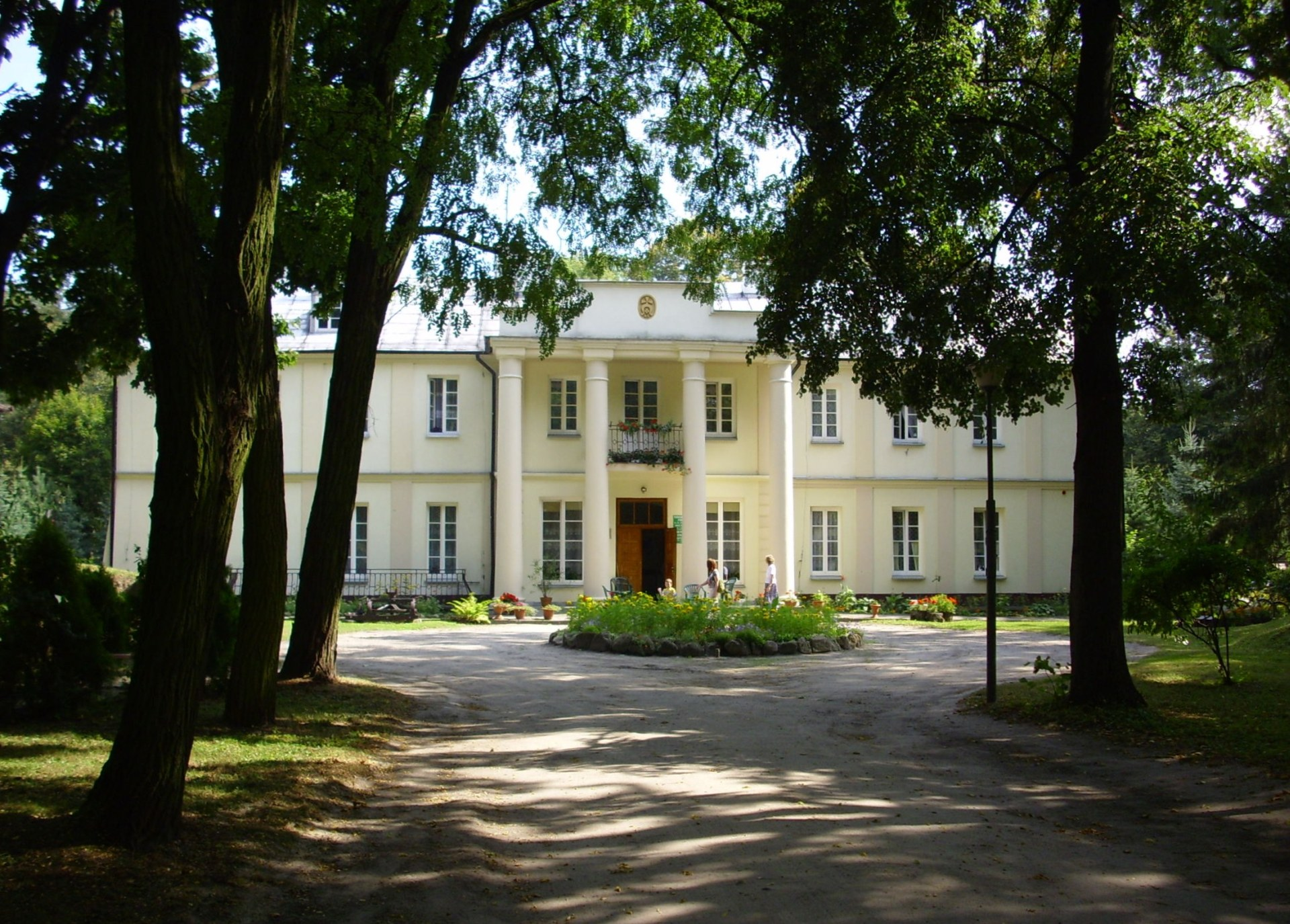
Placencja Palace
- Ruins of Sapieha Palace near the Church of the Holy Ghost
- Placencja Palace, summer residence of the Sapiehas from 18th century
- Cemetery chapel of St. Laurence (1683–1685)
- "Brama Unicka" /brama uni͜tska/ ("Uniate Gate"), the western gable of the Uniate ancient Saint-Michael's Church, burnt down in the 19th century
- Orthodox new Saint-Michael's Church (1910), today the only church for eastern worship in Kodeń
- Calvary with sculptures by Tadeusz Niewiadomski, reminding World War II
- Jewish cemetery
