= Dobromyśl, Gmina Kodeń =

Dobromyśl
- Village
- Location within Poland
- Coordinates: 51°54′N 23°34′E
- Country: Poland
- Voivodeship: Lublin
- County: Biała
- Gmina: Kodeń

Dobromyśl [dɔˈbrɔmɨɕl] is a village in the administrative district of Gmina Kodeń, within Biała County, Lublin Voivodeship, in eastern Poland, close to the border with Belarus.
