= Olszanki =

- Village
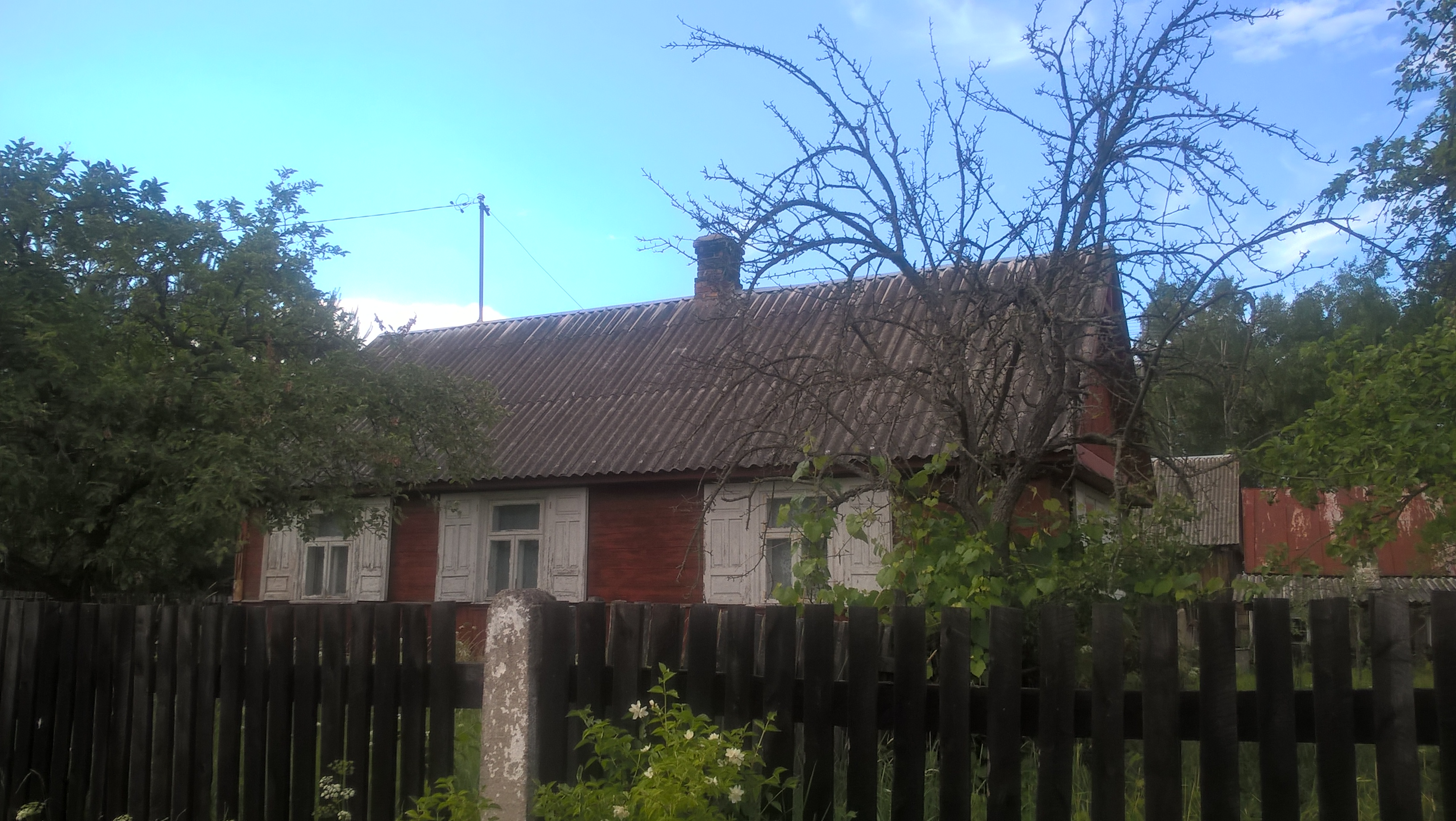

- Location within Poland
- Coordinates: 51°54′N 23°33′E
- Country: Poland
- Voivodeship: Lublin
- County: Biała
- Gmina: Kodeń
- Time zone: UTC+1 (CET)
  - Summer (DST): UTC+2 (CEST)

Olszanki [ɔlˈʂaŋkʲi] is a village in the administrative district of Gmina Kodeń, within Biała County, Lublin Voivodeship, in eastern Poland, close to the border with Belarus.

== History ==
Five Polish citizens were murdered by Nazi Germany in the village during World War II.
