= Szostaki, Gmina Kodeń =

Szostaki
- Village
- Location within Poland
- Coordinates: 51°50′N 23°35′E
- Country: Poland
- Voivodeship: Lublin
- County: Biała
- Gmina: Kodeń

Szostaki [ʂɔsˈtakʲi] is a village in the administrative district of Gmina Kodeń, within Biała County, Lublin Voivodeship, in eastern Poland, close to the border with Belarus. The population is 160.
