= Zagacie, Lublin Voivodeship =

Zagacie
- Village
- Location within Poland
- Coordinates: 51°56′54″N 23°34′35″E
- Country: Poland
- Voivodeship: Lublin
- County: Biała
- Gmina: Kodeń

Zagacie [zaˈɡat͡ɕɛ] is a village in the administrative district of Gmina Kodeń, within Biała County, Lublin Voivodeship, in eastern Poland, close to the border with Belarus.
