= Zalewsze =

- Village
- Location within Poland
- Coordinates: 51°52′N 23°36′E
- Country: Poland
- Voivodeship: Lublin
- County: Biała
- Gmina: Kodeń

Population
  - Total: 17

Zalewsze [zaˈlɛfʂɛ] is a village in the administrative district of Gmina Kodeń, within Biała County, Lublin Voivodeship, in eastern Poland, close to the border with Belarus.
