= Elżbiecin, Gmina Kodeń =

Elżbiecin
- Village
- Location within Poland
- Coordinates: 51°55′42″N 23°35′28″E
- Country: Poland
- Voivodeship: Lublin
- County: Biała
- Gmina: Kodeń

Elżbiecin [ɛlʐˈbʲɛt͡ɕin] is a border village in the administrative district of Gmina Kodeń, within Biała County, Lublin Voivodeship, in eastern Poland, close to the border with Belarus.
