= Zabłocie, Gmina Kodeń =

Zabłocie
- Village
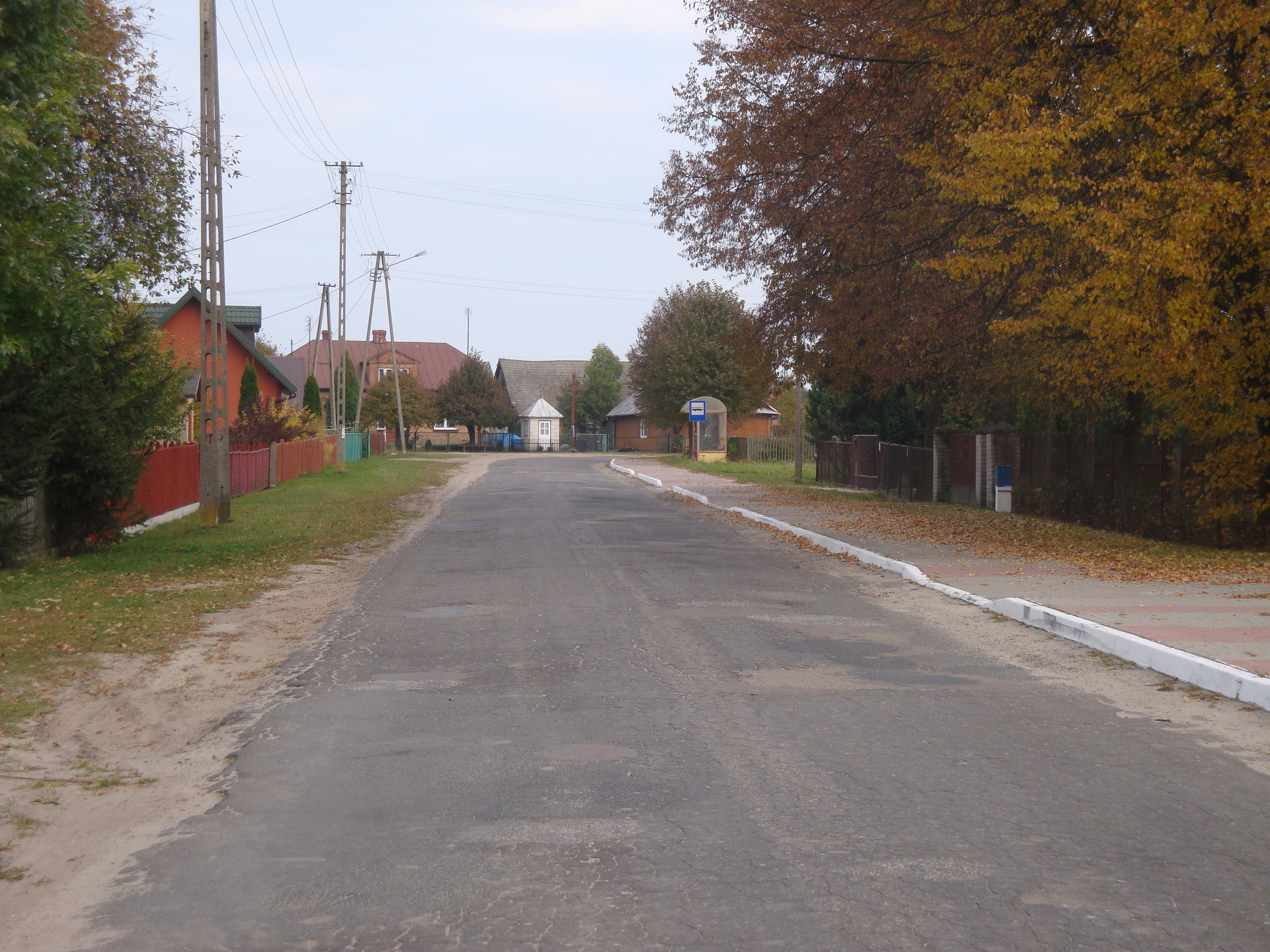

- Location within Poland
- Coordinates: 51°50′52″N 23°33′24″E
- Country: Poland
- Voivodeship: Lublin
- County: Biała
- Gmina: Kodeń

Zabłocie [zaˈbwɔt͡ɕɛ] is a village in the administrative district of Gmina Kodeń, within Biała County, Lublin Voivodeship, in eastern Poland, close to the border with Belarus.

From 1904 to 1907, an Orthodox Church of St. Nicholas was built in Zabłocie, designed by the architect of the Warsaw Eparchy, Vladimir Pokrowski. The church did not serve religious functions between 1915 and 1918, as the Orthodox inhabitants of Zabłocie were sent into exile. During the Second Polish Republic, it became the seat of the parish. The church was closed again after Operation Vistula but resumed its religious activity in 1951 (officially in 1954). The church is located in the center of the village.
