= Gmina Kodeń =

Gmina Kodeń Kodeń Commune
- Gmina
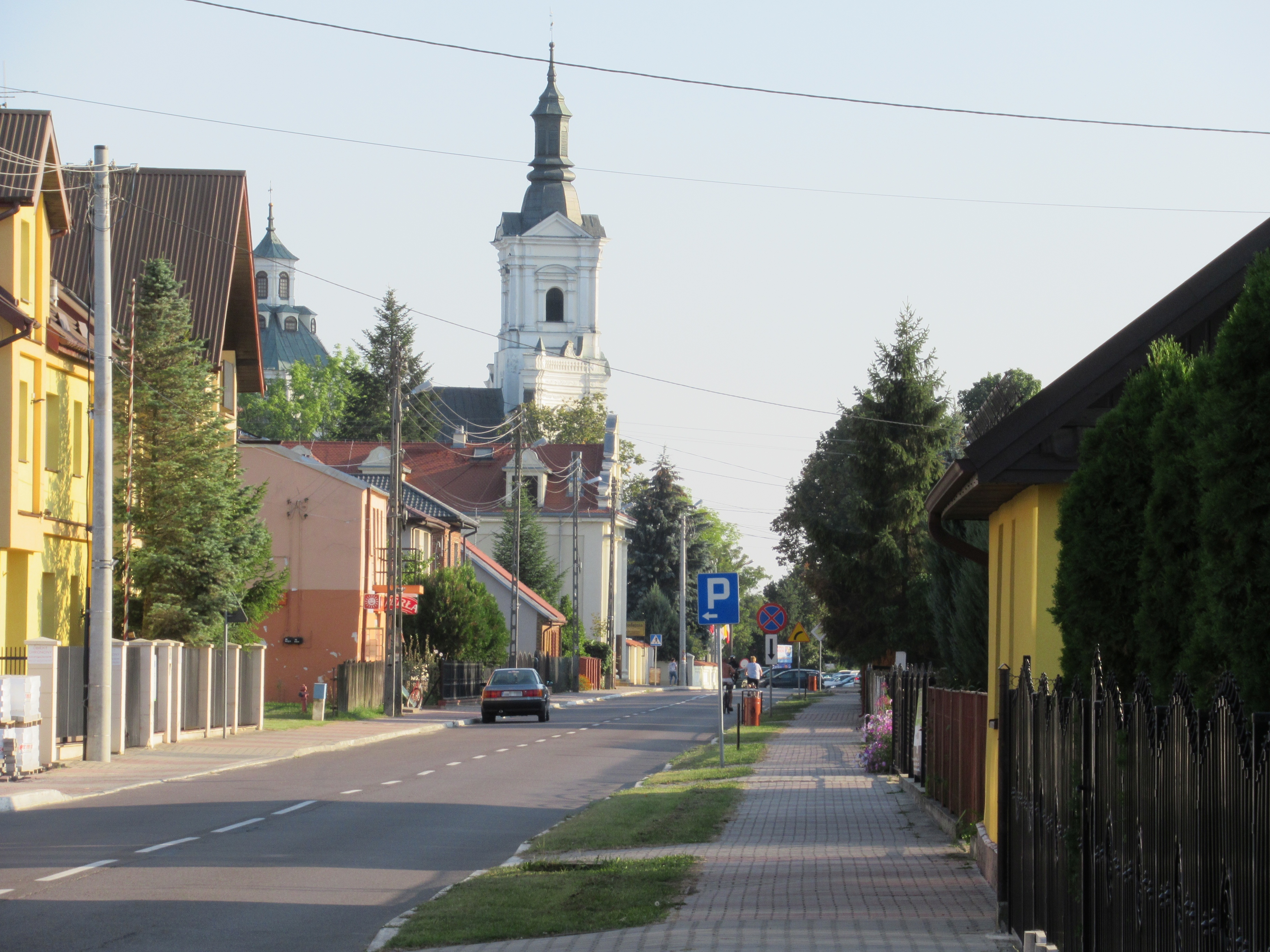

- Coat of arms

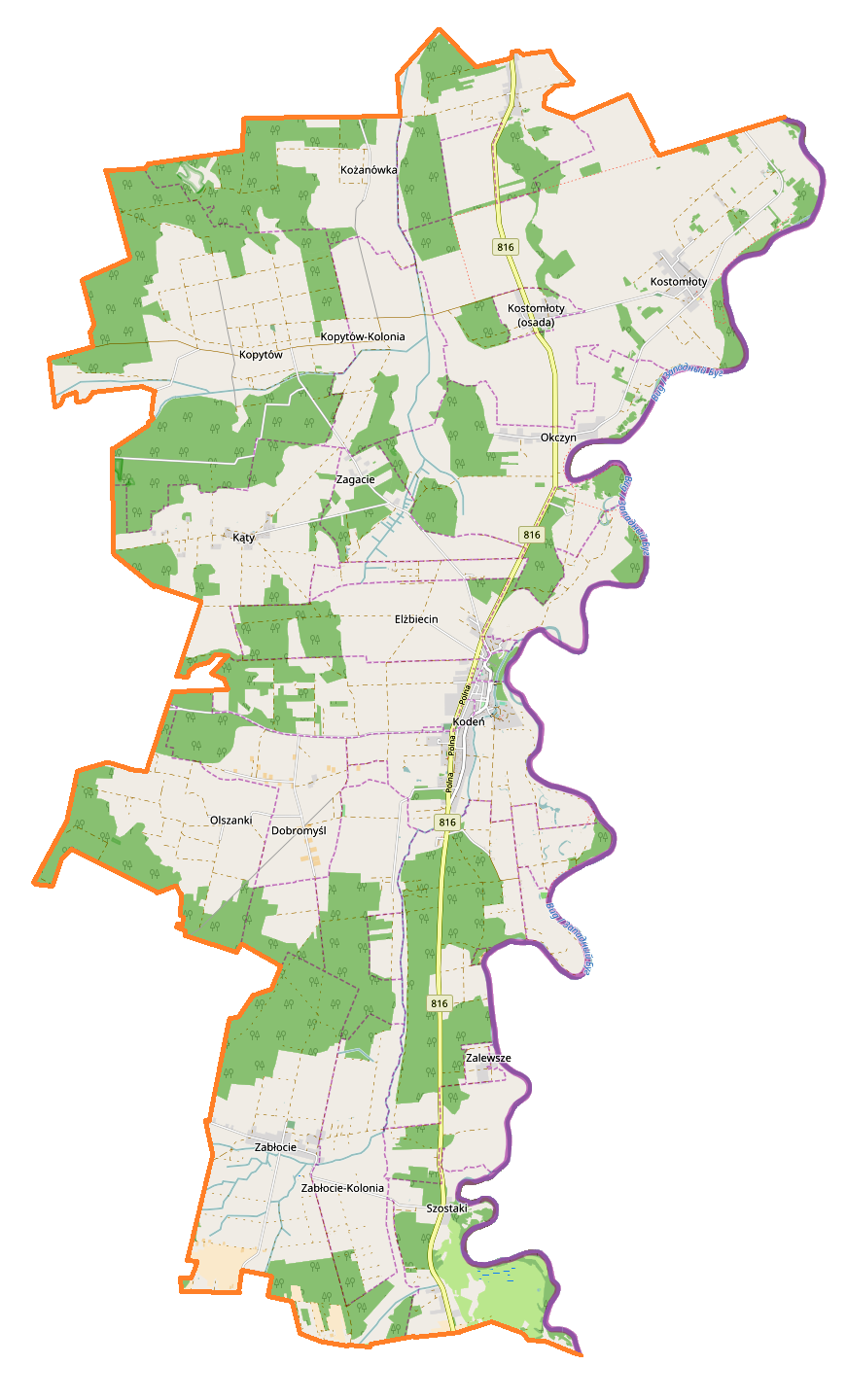

- Location within Poland
- Coordinates (Kodeń): 51°54′43″N 23°36′22″E
- Country: Poland
- Voivodeship: Lublin
- County: Biała County
- Seat: Kodeń

Area
  - Total: 150.33 km^{2} (58.04 sq mi)

Population (2014)
  - Total: 3,742
  - Density: 24.89/km^{2} (64.47/sq mi)
- Website: www.koden.gmina.woi.lublin.pl

Gmina Kodeń is a rural gmina (administrative district) in Biała County, Lublin Voivodeship, in eastern Poland, on the border with Belarus. Its seat is the village of Kodeń, which lies approximately 37 kilometres (23 mi) east of Biała Podlaska and 103 km (64 mi) north-east of the regional capital Lublin.

The gmina covers an area of 150.33 square kilometres (58.0 sq mi), and as of 2006 its total population is 3,998 (3,742 in 2014).

== Villages ==
Gmina Kodeń contains the villages and settlements of:

- Dobratycze
- Dobromyśl
- Elżbiecin
- Kąty
- Kodeń
- Kopytów
- Kopytów-Kolonia
- Kostomłoty
- Kożanówka
- Okczyn
- Olszanki
- Szostaki
- Zabłocie
- Zabłocie-Kolonia
- Zagacie
- Zalewsze

== Neighbouring gminas ==
Gmina Kodeń is bordered by the gminas of Piszczac, Sławatycze, Terespol and Tuczna. It also borders Belarus.
