= Kożanówka, Gmina Kodeń =

Kożanówka
- Village
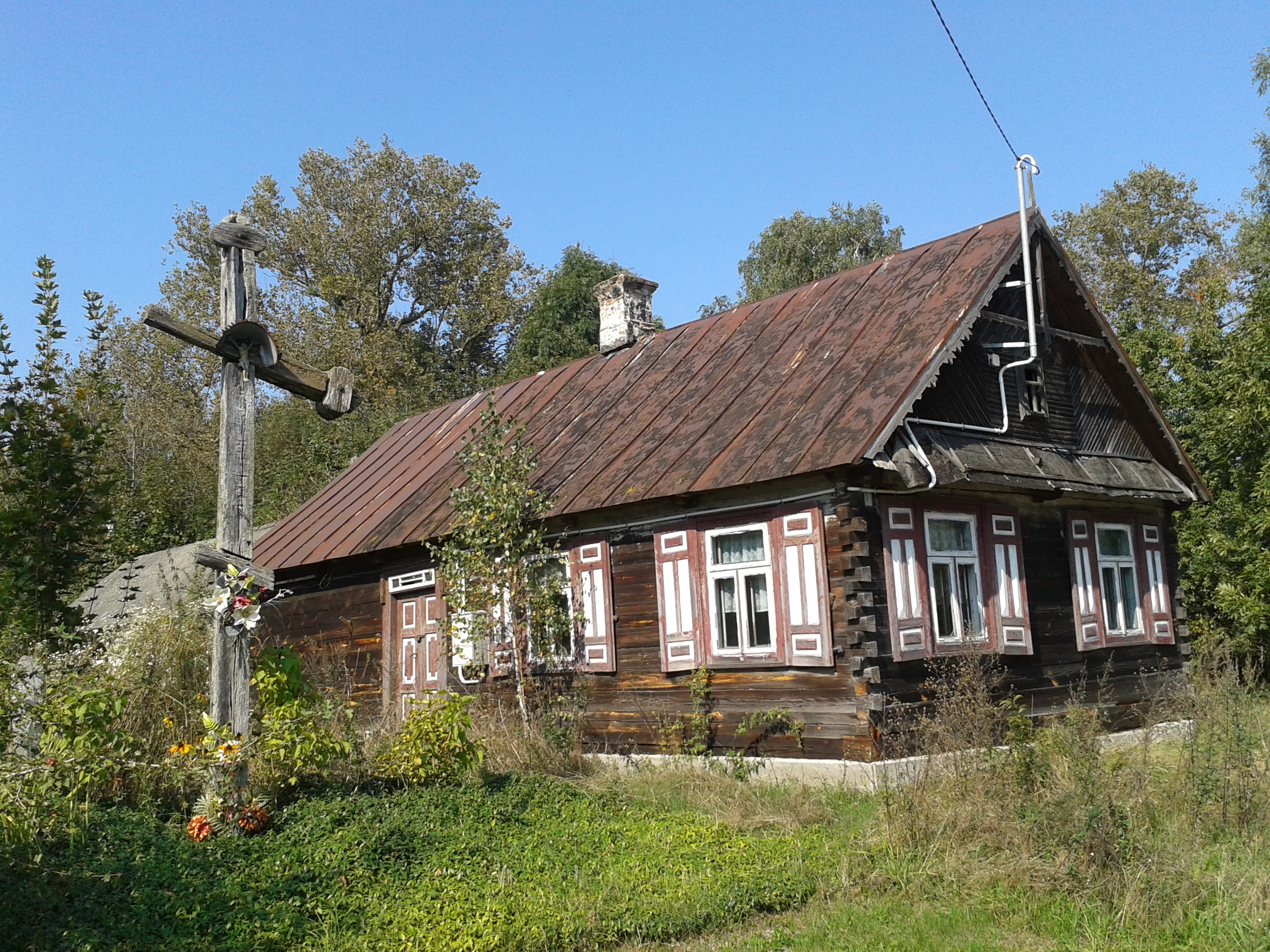

- Location within Poland
- Coordinates: 51°59′36″N 23°34′42″E
- Country: Poland
- Voivodeship: Lublin
- County: Biała
- Gmina: Kodeń
- Time zone: UTC+1 (CET)
  - Summer (DST): UTC+2 (CEST)

Kożanówka [kɔʐaˈnufka] is a village in the administrative district of Gmina Kodeń, within Biała County, Lublin Voivodeship, in eastern Poland, close to the border with Belarus.

== History ==
Seven Polish citizens were murdered by Nazi Germany in the village during World War II.
