= Church of the Exaltation of the Holy Cross, Dobratycze =

Orthodox church in Dobratycze, Poland

Church of the Exaltation of the Holy Cross
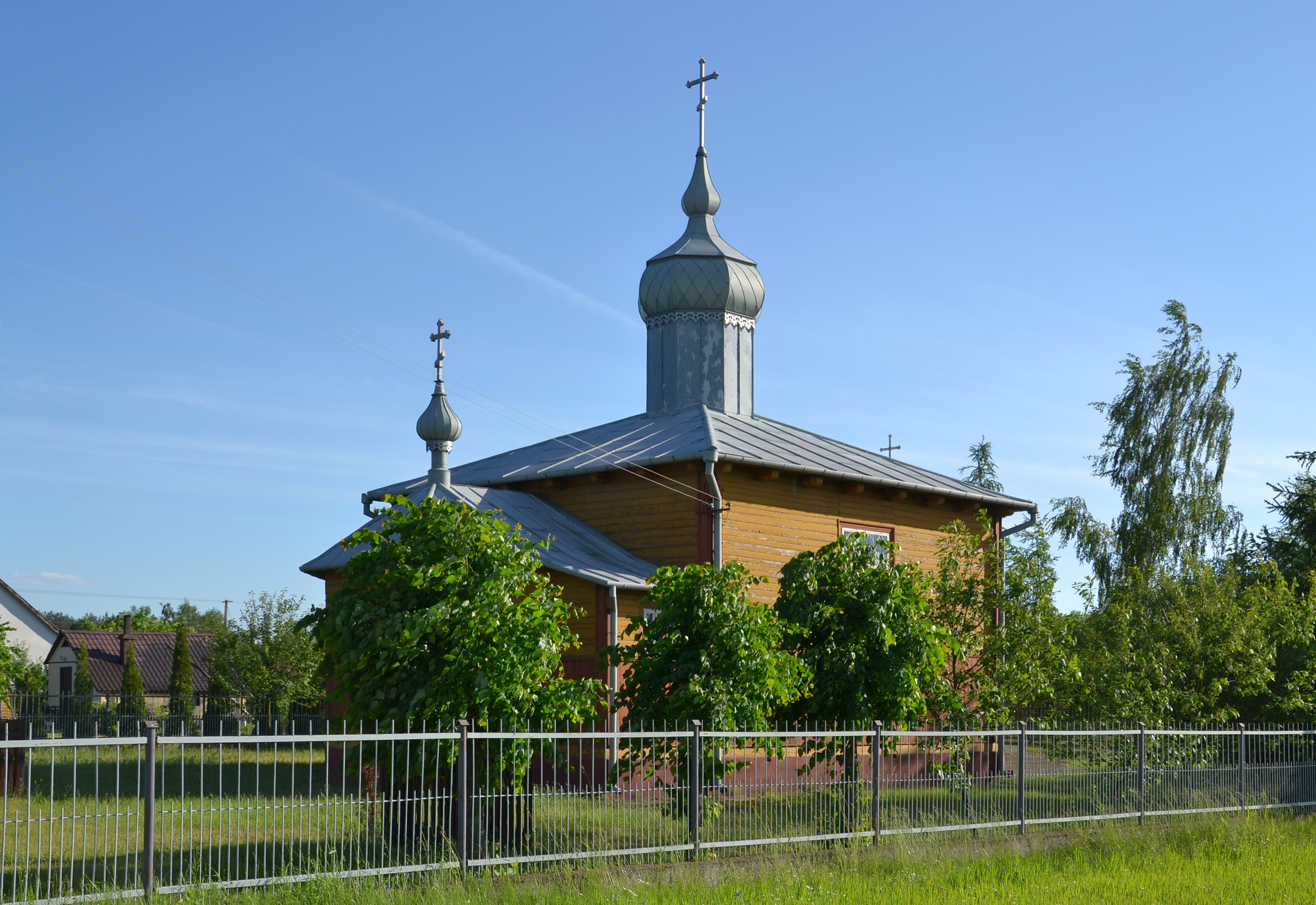
- General view of the church
- Church of the Exaltation of the Holy Cross
- 52°00′25.1″N 23°36′51.9″E
- Location: Dobratycze
- Country: Poland
- Denomination: Eastern Orthodoxy
- Churchmanship: Polish Orthodox Church

History
- Status: active Orthodox church
- Founder: Mikołaj Sapieha
- Dedication: Exaltation of the Holy Cross
- Dedicated: September 18, 2021

Architecture
- Completed: c. 1900

Specifications
- Materials: wood

Administration
- Diocese: Diocese of the Exaltation of the Holy Cross in Dobratycze

The Church of the Exaltation of the Holy Cross is an Orthodox parish church in Dobratycze. It belongs to the Terespol Deanery of the Diocese of Lublin and Chełm of the Polish Orthodox Church. It is located at the northern edge of Dobratycze, along the road to Terespol.

A wooden Uniate church, founded by Mikołaj Sapieha, had existed in Dobratycze since 1626. The Uniate parish remained active in the village until the Conversion of Chełm Eparchy, when the Russian authorities forcibly incorporated it into the Eparchy of Warsaw of the Russian Orthodox Church. In the early 20th century, a new Orthodox church was built in the locality, which remained in use until 1915–1916, when it was completely destroyed during wartime.

The currently operating church in Dobratycze was most likely originally located in Cyców and was later used in Biała Podlaska between 1956 and 1993 as a parish church. It was moved to Dobratycze after the construction of the brick Church of Saints Cyril and Methodius in Biała Podlaska.

It is a wooden building with a concrete foundation, oriented eastward, and features two small onion-shaped domes. Inside, it retains an iconostasis dating from the late 19th and early 20th centuries.

== History ==
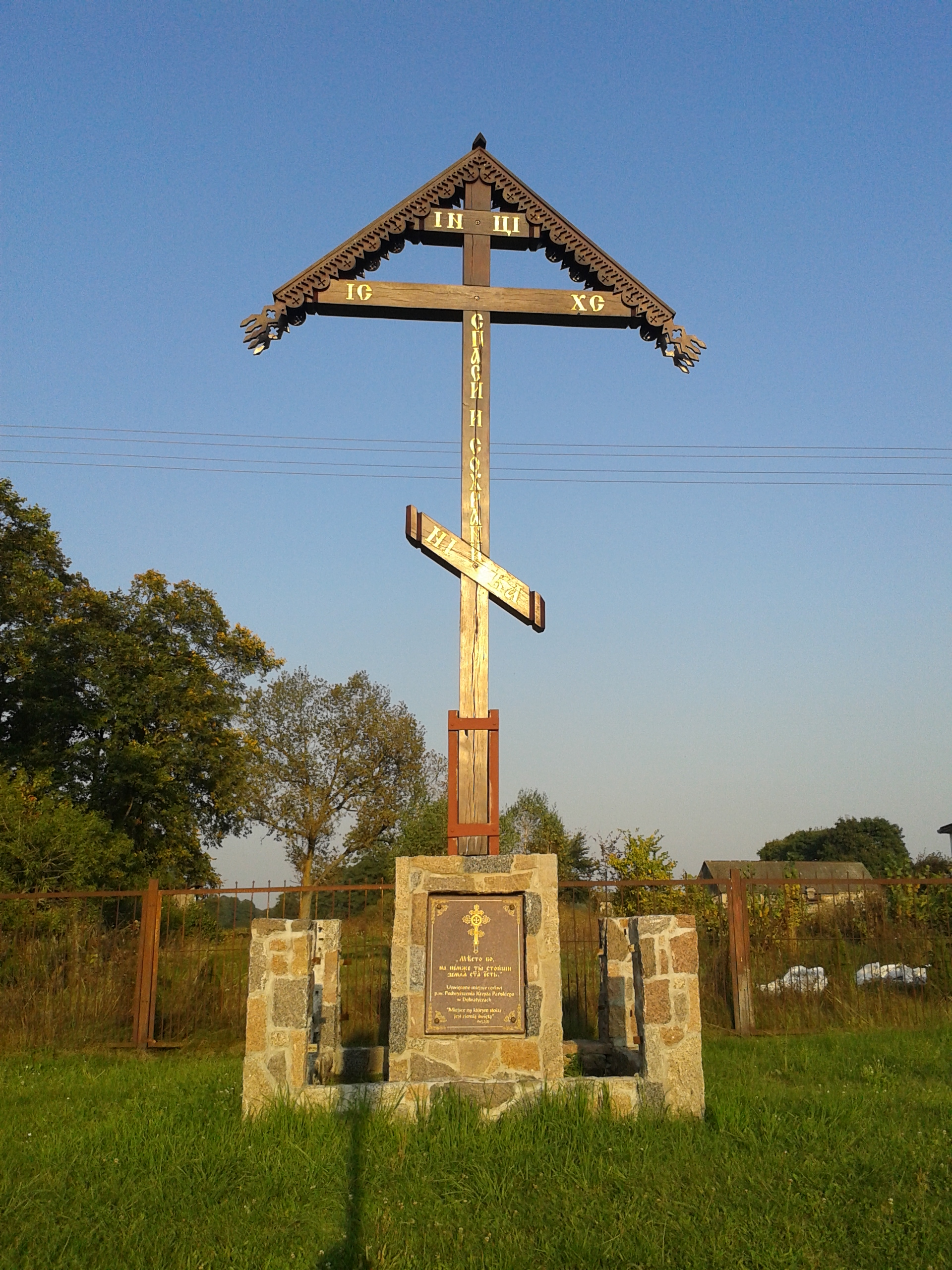
Cross at the site of the second church in Dobratycze, built in 1905 and destroyed during World War I

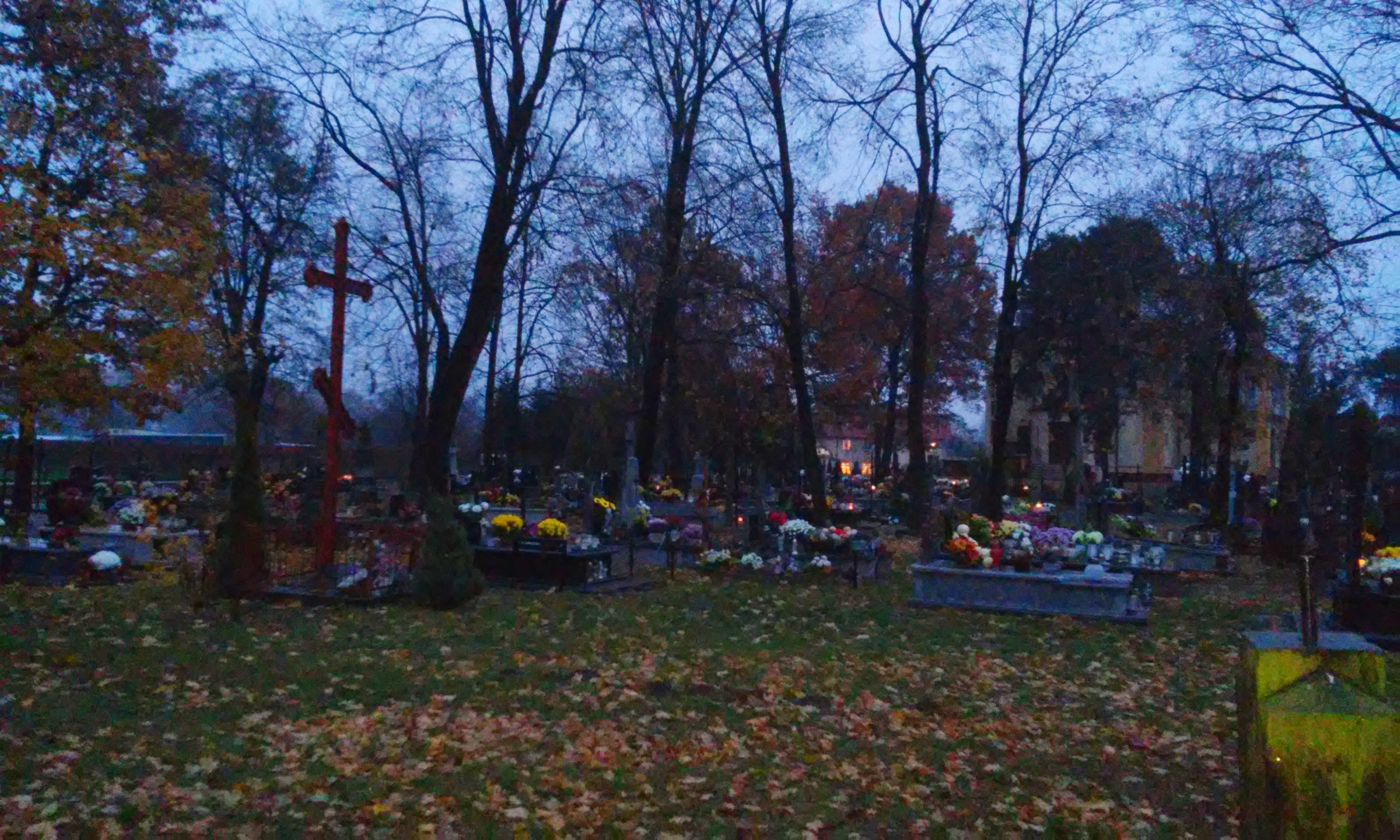
Site in the cemetery in Biała Podlaska where the church stood before being moved to Dobratycze. The cross marks the former location of the altar

=== First churches in Dobratycze ===
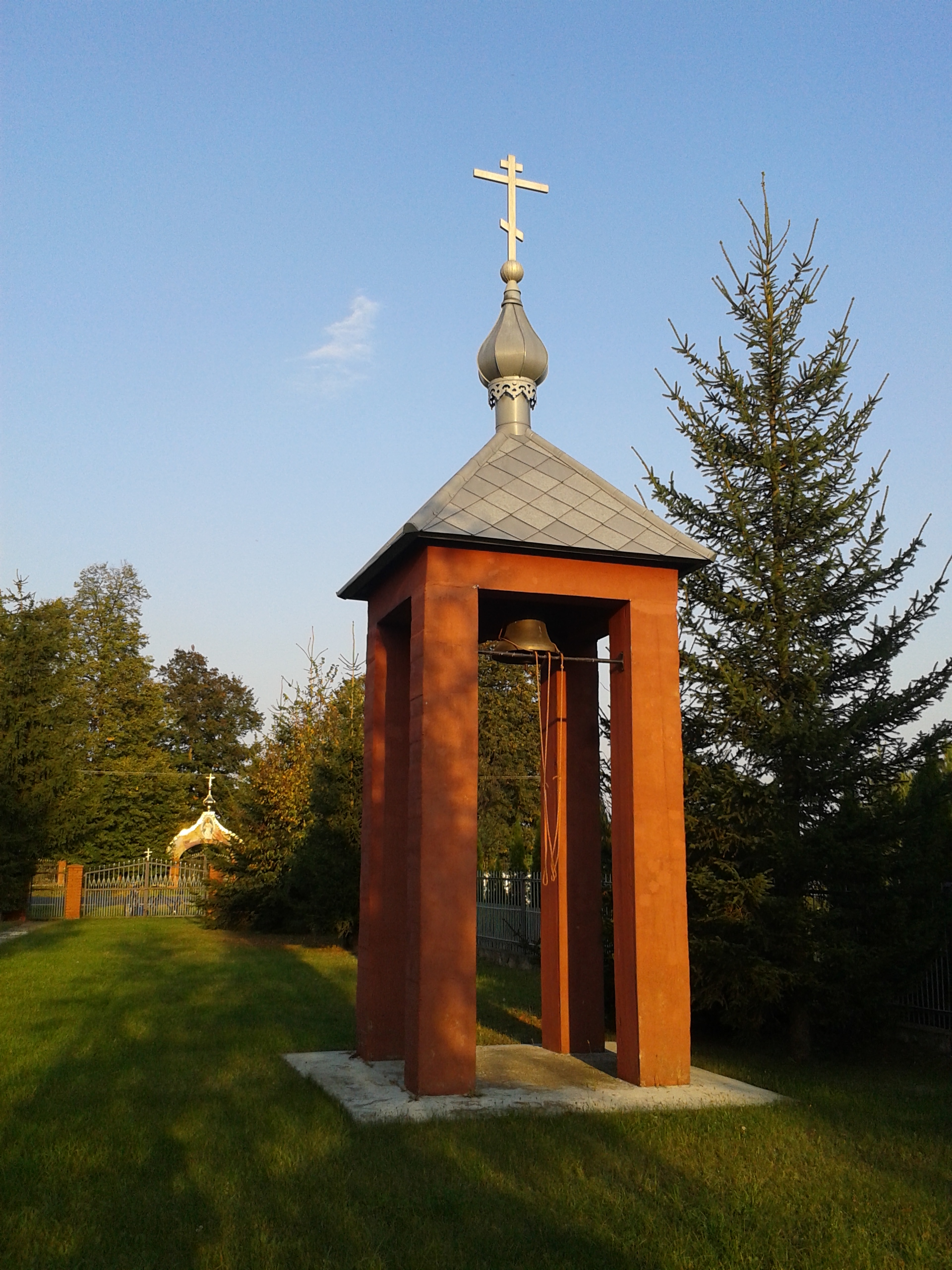
Bell tower

In the village of Dobratycze, which was established no later than the early 15th century, a Uniate church had existed since 1626. It was a wooden structure funded by Mikołaj Sapieha and remained in operation in 1726. The parish in Dobratycze was forcibly incorporated into the Russian Orthodox Church in 1875 as part of the Conversion of Chełm Eparchy.

In 1898, the Dobratycze church had 1,898 parishioners.

At the beginning of the 20th century, a new Orthodox church was built in Dobratycze. It was designed by Władimir Pokrowski, the chief architect of the Eparchy of Warsaw. The church was dedicated on 9 September 1906 by Bishop Eulogius of Chełm, assisted by Archimandrite Joseph, the superior of St. Onuphrius Monastery in Jabłeczna, along with five priests from the Chełm and neighboring Grodno eparchies. The construction and furnishings were funded by the Russian state treasury, which allocated a subsidy of 28,000 rubles, while local parishioners contributed an additional 2,500 rubles.

The church was a brick structure with a granite foundation, featuring a bell tower above the church porch that dominated the surrounding landscape. Its façades were adorned with depictions of saints on a golden background, and it had a single dome. When the new church was completed, the older wooden one was not demolished; in 1906, it was described as being in a state of decline.

The brick church in Dobratycze remained in use until 1915–1916. Located in an area affected by World War I and the Polish-Soviet War, it was completely destroyed as a result of the conflicts. Its existence is commemorated by a cross with a memorial plaque.

=== Church relocated to Dobratycze ===
According to most sources, the church currently functioning in Dobratycze was built in the early 20th century in Cyców, though some indicate that its original location was Pniówno. Initially, it was dedicated to St. Michael the Archangel. The Cyców parish suspended its pastoral activities during World War I when its parishioners fled during the mass exile.

During the interwar period, the church in Cyców was included in the list of religious buildings planned for legal reopening, compiled in 1919 by the Ministry of Religious Affairs and Public Education. However, it does not appear in records of active Orthodox places of worship in the Lublin Land from between 1923 and 1927.

According to M. Chyl, despite local residents wishing to repurpose the building as a cemetery chapel, a decision was made between 1947 and 1948 to dismantle the church. However, on the initiative of Father Aleksander Biront, the parson in Biała Podlaska, the building was ultimately relocated in 1956 to the Orthodox cemetery in Biała Podlaska to serve as the new parish church. Since the previous cemetery church had been demolished during the 1938 revindication campaign, Biała Podlaska had lacked a freestanding Orthodox church. At its new site, the church was rededicated to the Nativity of the Mother of God.

With the construction of a new brick parish church in Biała Podlaska, the wooden church was relocated to Dobratycze in 1993 or 1994 by decision of Bishop Abel of Lublin and Chełm. It was dedicated in honor of the Exaltation of the Holy Cross, receiving the same dedication as the Dobratycze church that had existed from 1906 to 1915.

In the second decade of the 21st century, the church underwent extensive renovations and was subsequently consecrated by Archbishop Paisjusz of Przemyśl and Gorlice on 18 September 2021.

== Architecture ==
The church was built from wood on a concrete foundation. It is oriented, clad in formwork, and has a log construction. The entrance to the building is through a church porch with a gable roof finished with a triangular gable and a polygonal bell tower topped with an onion-shaped dome and an Orthodox cross. Above the main square nave, which is higher than the church porch, there is a flat ceiling supported by columns. The roof over the nave is hipped, and it features an octagonal bell tower, also topped with an onion-shaped dome. The chancel is smaller than the nave, with a rectangular closure and a side sacristy built in a rectangular shape and covered with a lean-to roof.

Inside the church, there is a five-bay iconostasis dating from the turn of the 19th and 20th centuries, blending elements of the Renaissance Revival architecture with typical features of Russian Revival sacred art.

Next to the church, there is a freestanding wooden bell tower, and across from the temple, there is an Orthodox cemetery with three historic Uniate tombstones from the 1850s and Orthodox gravestones from the second half of the 19th century.
