= Dobratycze =

- Village
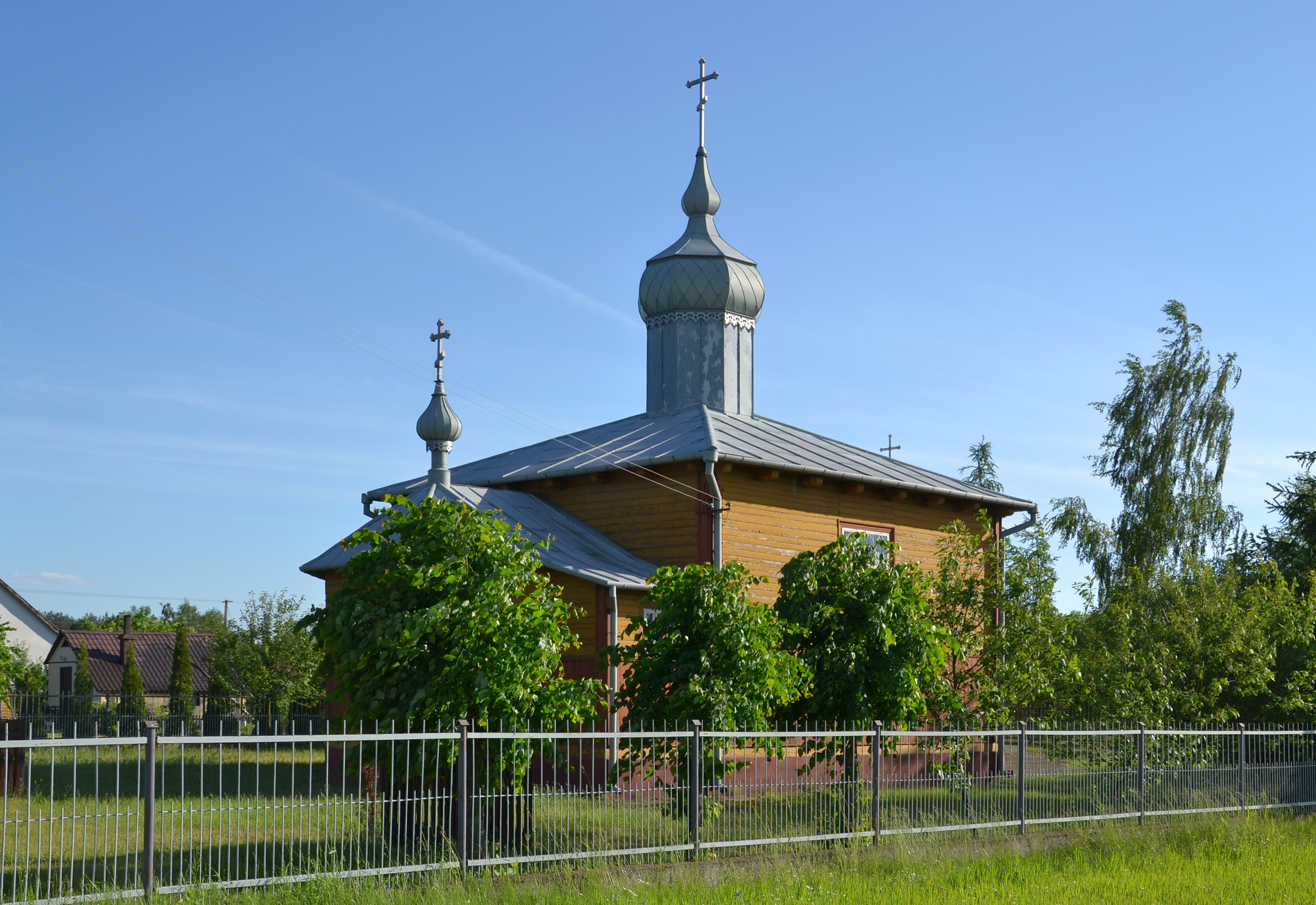
- Orthodox Church of the Exaltation of the Holy Cross

- Location within Poland
- Coordinates: 52°1′N 23°37′E
- Country: Poland
- Voivodeship: Lublin
- County: Biała
- Gmina: Kodeń

Dobratycze [dɔbraˈtɨt͡ʂɛ] is a village in the administrative district of Gmina Kodeń, within Biała County, Lublin Voivodeship, in eastern Poland, close to the border with Belarus.
