= Kobylany, Lublin Voivodeship =

Kobylany
- Village
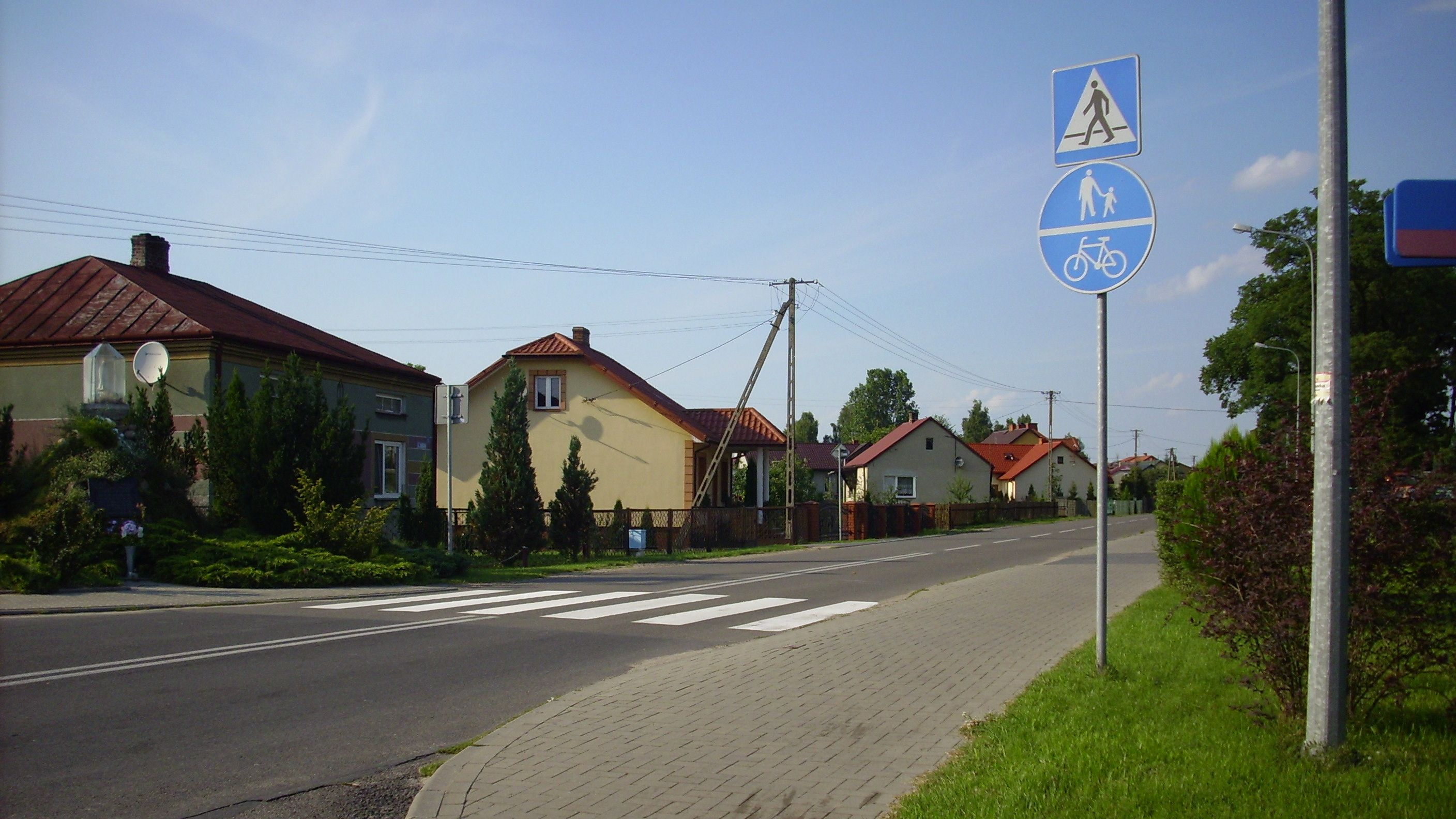

- Location within Poland
- Coordinates: 52°3′N 23°34′E
- Country: Poland
- Voivodeship: Lublin
- County: Biała
- Gmina: Terespol
- Website: http://kobylany.pl

Kobylany [kɔbɨˈlanɨ] is a village in the administrative district of Gmina Terespol, within Biała County, Lublin Voivodeship, in eastern Poland, close to the border with Belarus.

== History ==
The Nazis established a labor camp, which existed between autumn 1942 and February 1944, for Jews from Czechoslovakia and surrounding towns and villages. There were Jews from the Terespol ghetto among the camp prisoners. Frequently, the Jews who were deemed unfit for work were shot in a forest near the camp. According to the Polish archives, more than 800 Jews from the Malaszewicze labor camp were also shot in a forest near Kobylany in several mass graves. One of the execution sites is located in Kobylany, close to the former fort. The executions lasted from 1943 till 1944.

There is a 19th-century Orthodox Church of the Dormition of the Theotokos located there. The church remained continuously active during World War II and the post-war years. The building was renovated in the 1980s (including the restoration of the iconostasis), and again in the early 21st century. After the renovation was completed, the church was solemnly dedicated on 14 October 2016 by Archbishop Abel of Lublin and Chełm. In 2017, the Provincial Conservator of Monuments in Lublin awarded the church the Conservator's Laurel (for the best-restored monument of the year). After the interior renovations were completed, the church was dedicated by Archbishop Abel on 18 July 2021.
