= Kopytów, Lublin Voivodeship =

Kopytów
- Village
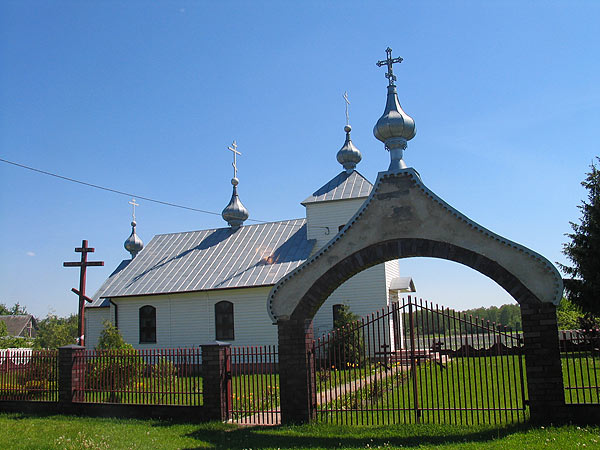
- Saint John the Evangelist Orthodox church

- Location within Poland
- Coordinates: 51°58′N 23°34′E
- Country: Poland
- Voivodeship: Lublin
- County: Biała
- Gmina: Kodeń

Kopytów [kɔˈpɨtuf] is a village in the administrative district of Gmina Kodeń, within Biała County, Lublin Voivodeship, in eastern Poland, close to the border with Belarus.
