= Zygmunt Kamiński =

Roman Catholic bishop

- Archbishop of Szczecin-Kamień
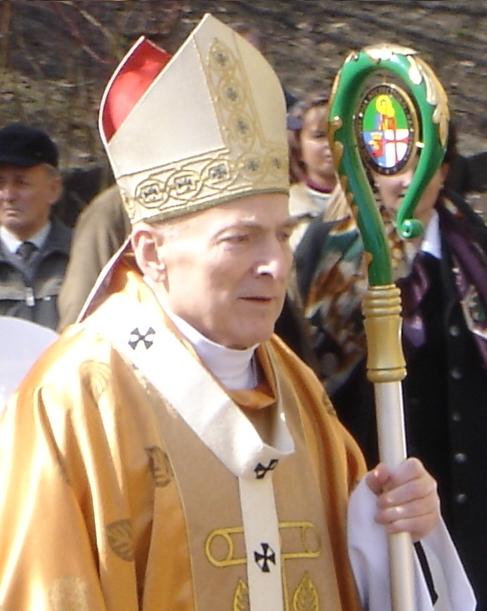
- Church: Catholic Church
- Archdiocese: Archdiocese of Szczecin-Kamień
- In office: 1 May 1992 – 21 February 2009
- Predecessor: Jerzy Stroba
- Successor: Marian Przykucki
- Previous posts: Bishop of Płock (1988-1999); Coadjutor Bishop of Płock (1984-1988); Titular Bishop of Midica (1975-1984); Auxiliary Bishop of Lublin (1975-1984)

Orders
- Ordination: 25 December 1956 by Piotr Kałwa
- Consecration: 30 November 1975 by Bolesław Pylak

Personal details
- Born: 22 February 1933 Bełżyce, Lublin Voivodeship, Poland
- Died: 1 May 2010 (aged 77) Szczecin, West Pomeranian Voivodeship, Poland

Zygmunt Kamiński (22 February 1933 in Bełżyce – 1 May 2010 in Szczecin) was the archbishop of the Roman Catholic Archdiocese of Szczecin-Kamień, Poland.

Ordained priest on 22 December 1956, Kamiński was named auxiliary bishop of the Roman Catholic Archdiocese of Lublin on 28 October 1975 and was consecrated on 30 November 1975. He eventually became bishop of the Roman Catholic Diocese of Płock and in 1999 was appointed archbishop of the Szczecin-Kamień Archdiocese, retiring on 21 February 2009.
