= Ryszard Karpiński =

Polish Roman Catholic prelate (1935–2024)

- Auxiliary Bishop Emeritus of Lublin
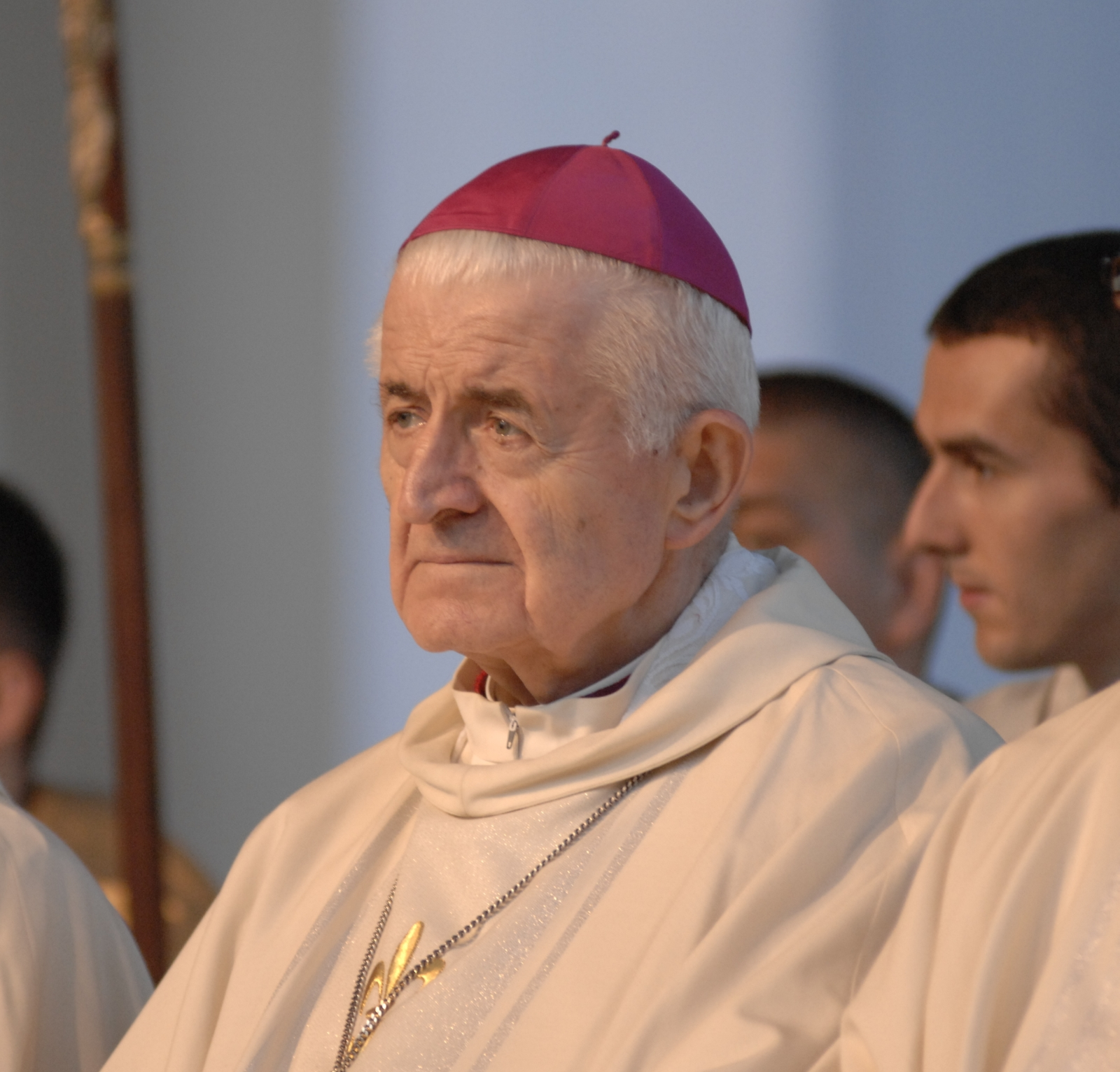
- Appointed: 19 August 1985
- Term ended: 31 December 2011
- Other post: Titular Bishop of Minervium (1985–2024)

Orders
- Ordination: 19 April 1959 by Piotr Kałwa
- Consecration: 29 September 1985 by Józef Glemp

Personal details
- Born: 28 December 1935 Rudzienko, Lublin Voivodeship, Poland
- Died: 5 January 2024 (aged 88) Lublin, Poland
- Motto: Viatoribus fer auxilium
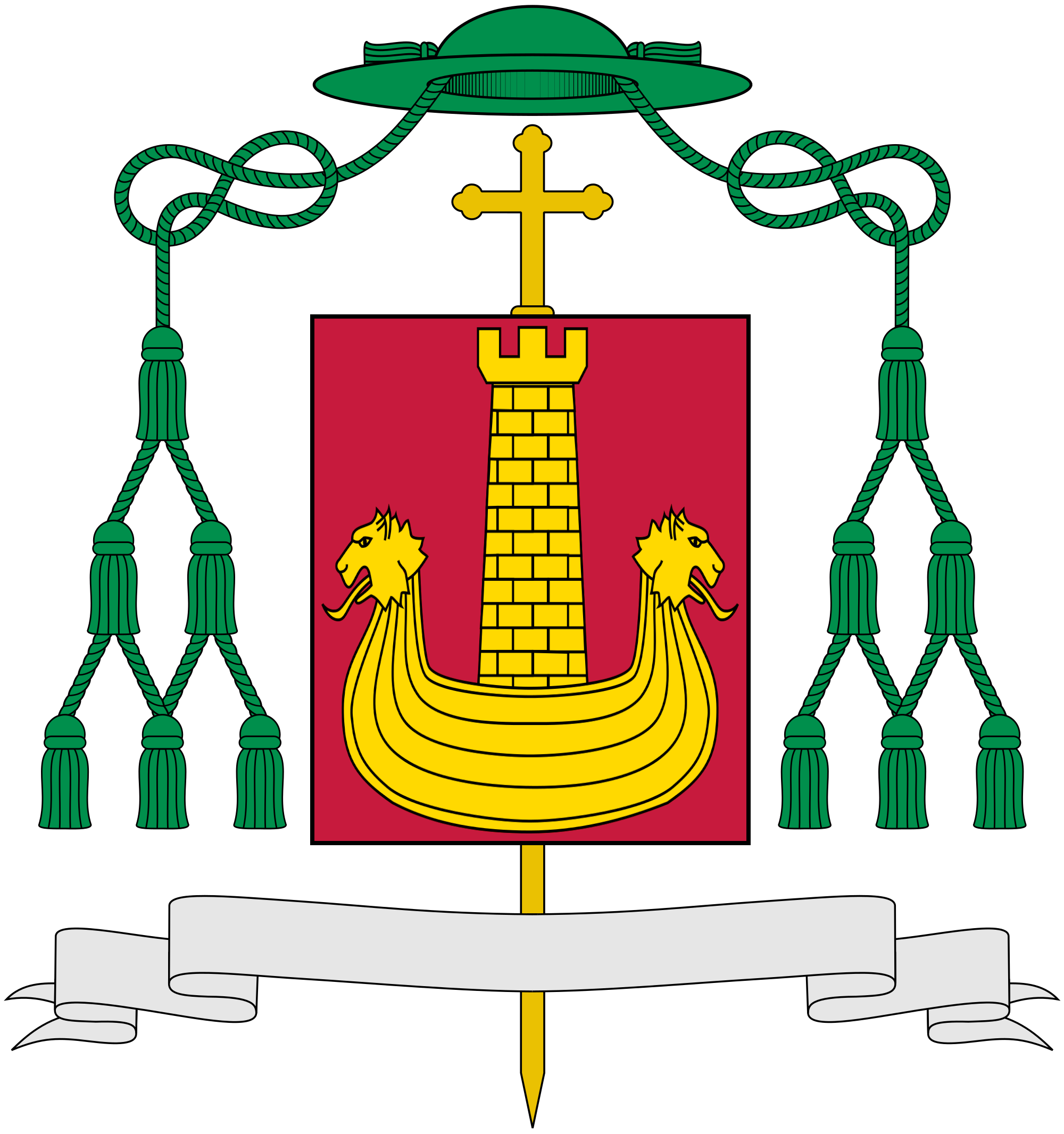
- Coat of arms

Styles of Ryszard Karpiński
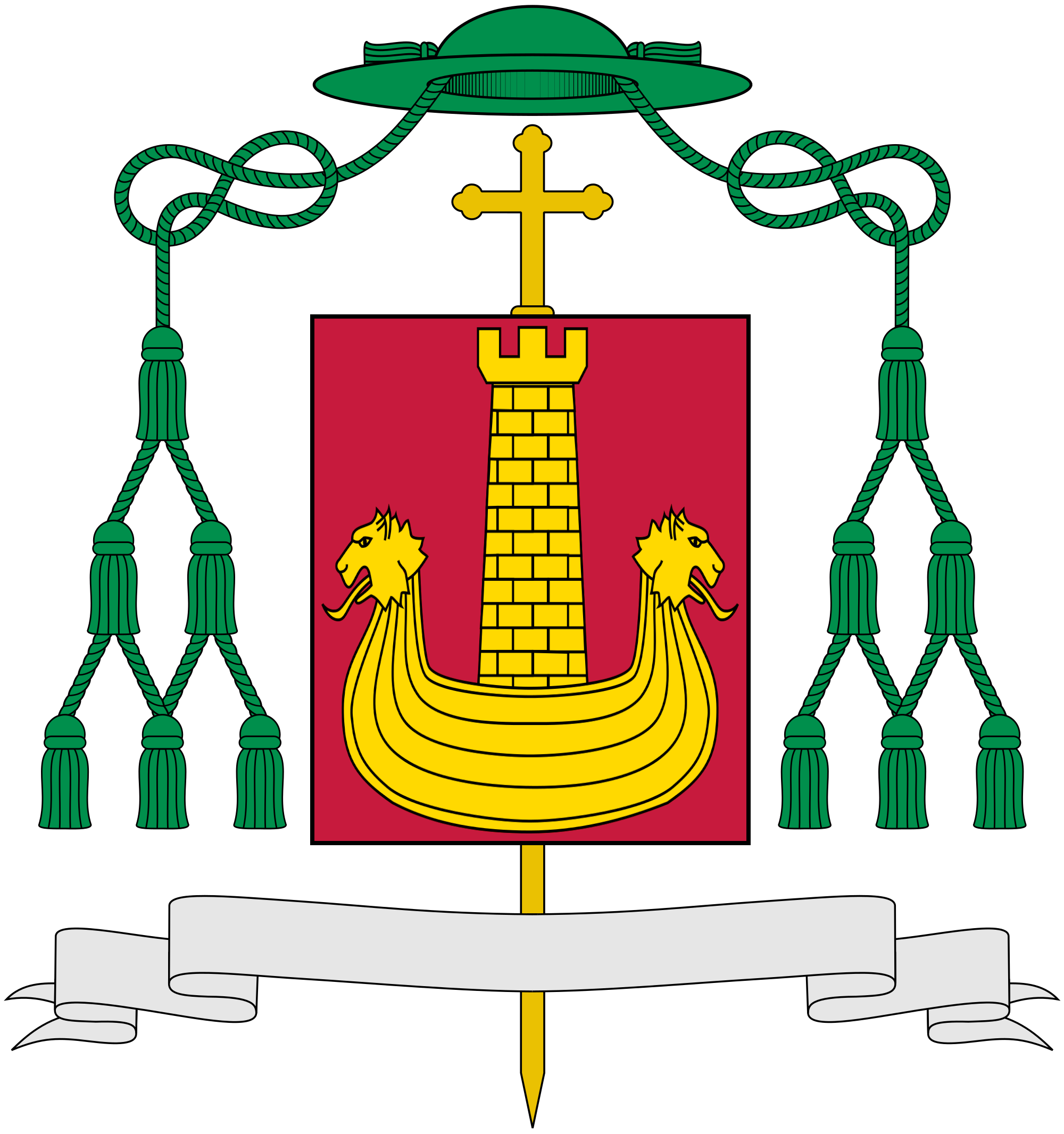
- Reference style: His Excellency; The Most Reverend
- Spoken style: Your Excellency
- Religious style: Bishop

Ryszard Karpiński (28 December 1935 – 5 January 2024) was a Polish prelate of the Catholic Church. He served as auxiliary bishop of Lublin from 1985 to 2011. He was also the titular bishop of Minervium until his death.

== Biography ==
Ryszard Karpiński was born on 28 December 1935, in Rudzienko. In the years 1948–1949, he studied agricultural training at an evening school, while working on the family farm. In the years 1949–1953 he was educated at the Minor Seminary in Lublin, where he obtained his private high school leaving examination in 1953. He passed the state secondary school leaving examination in 1957. In the years 1953–1959 he studied at the Major Seminary in Lublin and at the same time at the Faculty of Theology of the Catholic University of Lublin, where he obtained his master's degree in 1959.

He was ordained a priest on 19 April 1959, in Lublin by the local diocesan bishop, Piotr Kałwa. From 1960 to 1963 he studied at the Biblical Section of the Theological Faculty of the Catholic University of Lublin, obtaining a bachelor's degree in theology in 1963. In the years 1963–1969 he stayed in Rome, studying at the Pontifical Biblical Institute, graduating in 1966 with a licentiate in biblical sciences, and at the Pontifical University of Saint Thomas Aquinas, where, based on his dissertation The concept of "Exousia" in the teaching of Jesus and the apostolic mission according to Saint. Mateusz obtained a doctorate in theological sciences. In the years 1959–1960 he worked as a vicar in the parish of St. Teresa of the Child Jesus in Lublin and a religion teacher (prefect) at the local Primary School No. 17. While studying at the Catholic University of Lublin, he was also a catechist for students of the State Primary Music School. During his studies in Rome, he went on vacation to France, Ireland, Austria, Germany and the United States, where he helped in pastoral work and improved his knowledge of foreign languages. In the years 1971–1985 he was an employee of the Pontifical Commission for the Pastoral Care of Migrants and Itinerants. At the same time, he collaborated with the Polish section of Vatican Radio and the editorial office of "L'Osservatore Romano". In 1975, he was appointed honorary canon of the cathedral chapter in Lublin, and in 1977 he received the dignity of honorary chaplain of His Holiness. From 1970 to 1971, he was the second prefect of the Major Seminary in Lublin and secretary of the Institute of Religious Culture at the Catholic University of Lublin. During this period, he taught Italian at the Catholic University of Lublin and lectured on the Holy Scripture at the Institute of Religious Culture.

On 24 August 1985, he was consecrated auxiliary bishop of the Lublin diocese with the titular see of Minervium. He was ordained a bishop on 28 September 1985, in the Cathedral of St. John the Baptist and Saint John the Evangelist in Lublin. They were given to him by Cardinal Józef Glemp, Primate of Poland, assisted by Bolesław Pylak, diocesan bishop of Lublin, and Archbishop Bronisław Dąbrowski, auxiliary bishop of Warsaw. He adopted the words "Viatoribus fer auxilium" (Help travelers) as his episcopal motto. On 7 September 1985, he was appointed vicar general of the diocese. In the same year, he was appointed parish priest of the cathedral parish in Lublin. He became a member of the priestly council and the college of consultors of the diocese. In 1989, he became a general canon of the cathedral chapter in Lublin, and took up the position of dean there. On 31 December 2011, Pope Benedict XVI accepted his resignation as auxiliary bishop of the Archdiocese of Lublin.

In the structures of the Polish Episcopate, he served as chairman of the Commission for Tourist Pastoral Care (1988–1998), the Team for Aid to Catholics in the East (1991–2002) and the Commission for the Polish Diaspora and Poles Abroad (2003–2008). He was a delegate at the International Catholic Commission for Migration in Geneva (1989–1995) and a delegate for the Pastoral Care of Polish Emigration (2003–2008), and also served as a delegate to International Eucharistic Congresses many times. Moreover, as part of the Second Polish Plenary Synod, in the years 1990–1999 he was a member of the 9th Commission on "Mission and Emigration". In the years 1988–1993 he was consultor of the Pontifical Council for the Pastoral Care of Migration and Travelers. He also became a member of the National Council of the "Wspólnota Polska" Association. He died in Lublin on 5 January 2024, at the age of 88. On 13 January, he was buried in the crypt of the Lublin church of St. Peter the Apostle.

== Decorations ==
In 2009, the President of the Republic of Poland, Lech Kaczyński, awarded him the Officer's Cross of the Order of Polonia Restituta. In 2007, he received the Medal of Merit for the Catholic University of Lublin, and in 2009 he was honored with the Gold Medal of the "Wspólnota Polska" Association.

Catholic Church titles
Preceded by —	Auxiliary Bishop of Lublin; 1985–2011	Succeeded by —
Preceded by Ramón Torrella Cascante	Titular Bishop of Minervium; 1985–2024	Succeeded by Vacant
