= Pieńki =

Pieńki may refer to the following places:

- Pieńki, Łódź Voivodeship (central Poland)
- Pieńki, Augustów County in Podlaskie Voivodeship (north-east Poland)
- Pieńki, Białystok County in Podlaskie Voivodeship (north-east Poland)
- Pieńki, Łuków County in Lublin Voivodeship (east Poland)
- Pieńki, Włodawa County in Lublin Voivodeship (east Poland)
- Pieńki, Radom County in Masovian Voivodeship (east-central Poland)
- Pieńki, Gmina Domanice in Masovian Voivodeship (east-central Poland)
- Pieńki, Gmina Kotuń in Masovian Voivodeship (east-central Poland)
- Pieńki, Gmina Mokobody in Masovian Voivodeship (east-central Poland)
- Pieńki, Gmina Mordy in Masovian Voivodeship (east-central Poland)
- Pieńki, Wołomin County in Masovian Voivodeship (east-central Poland)
- Pieńki, Greater Poland Voivodeship (west-central Poland)
- Pieńki, Opole Voivodeship (south-west Poland)
- Pieńki, Warmian-Masurian Voivodeship (north Poland)
