= Elżbieta Radziszewska =

Polish politician (born 1958)

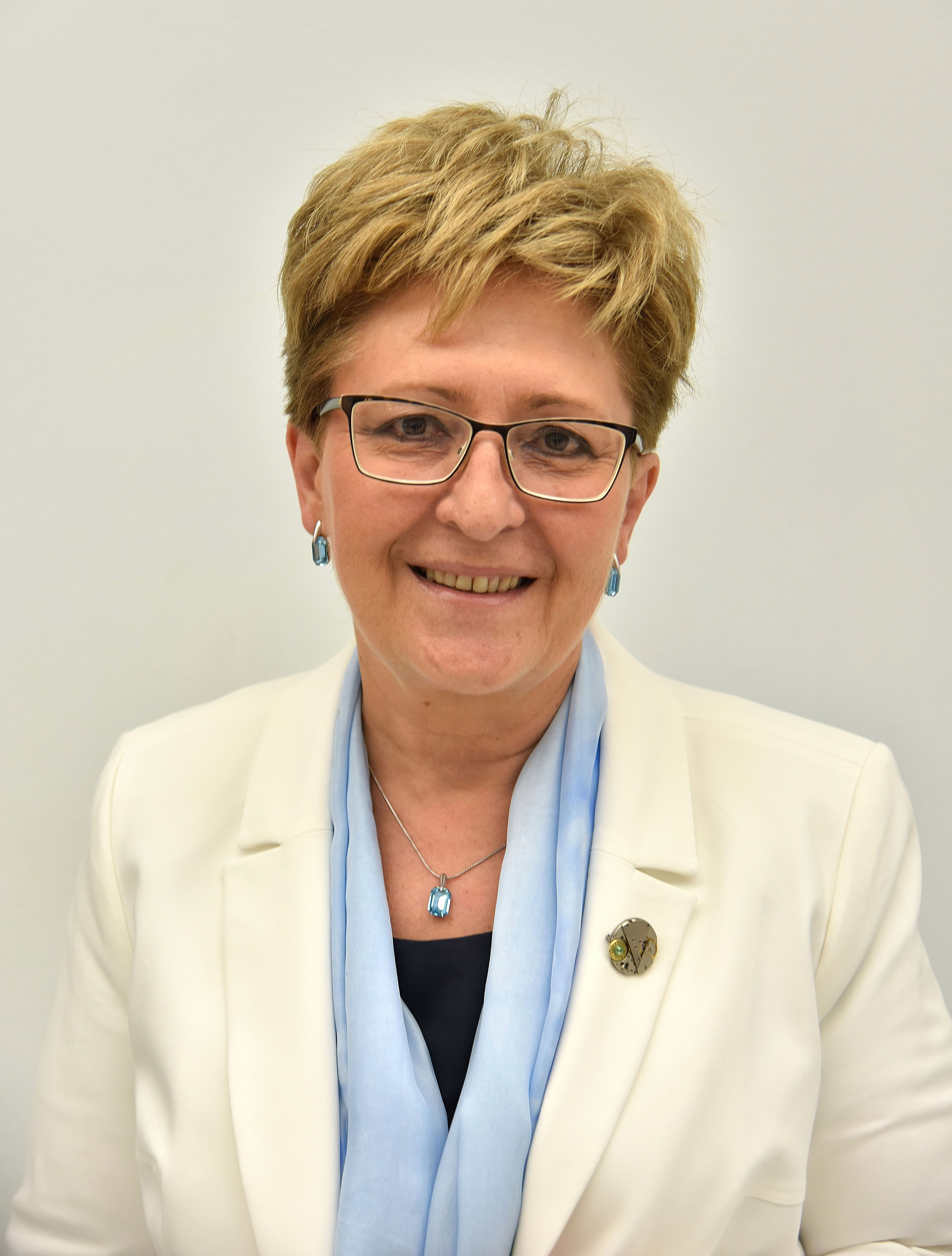

Deputy Marshal of Sejm
- In office 24 September 2014 – 11 November 2015

Personal details
- Born: 6 January 1958 (age 68)
- Party: Civic Platform

Elżbieta Radziszewska (born 6 January 1958 in Białocin) is a Polish politician. She was elected to the Sejm on 25 September 2005, getting 16,199 votes in the Piotrków Trybunalski electoral district, representing the Civic Platform party. Since 30 April 2008 she is the Plenipotentiary for Equality.

She was also a member of Sejm 1997-2001 and Sejm 2001-2005.

== See also ==
- Members of Polish Sejm 2005-2007
