= Bagno =

Bagno may refer to:

== Places ==
=== Poland ===
- Bagno, Lower Silesian Voivodeship (south-west Poland)
- Bagno, Kuyavian-Pomeranian Voivodeship (central Poland)
- Bagno, Białystok County in Podlaskie Voivodeship (north-east Poland)
- Bagno, Łomża County in Podlaskie Voivodeship (north-east Poland)
- Bagno, Mońki County in Podlaskie Voivodeship (north-east Poland)
- Bagno, Łódź Voivodeship (central Poland)
- Bagno, Lublin Voivodeship (east Poland)
- Bagno, Konin County in Greater Poland Voivodeship (central Poland)
- Bagno, Lubusz Voivodeship (west Poland)
- Bagno, Warmian-Masurian Voivodeship (north Poland)
- Bagno, West Pomeranian Voivodeship (north-west Poland)

=== Elsewhere ===
- Bagno (L'Aquila), a frazione in Abruzzo, Italy
- Santa Maria al Bagno, a town in Italy
- Steinfurter Bagno, a park in Westphalia, Germany

== Other ==
- Bill Bagno, a character in Third and Indiana

== See also ==
- Bagnio
