= Stefanówka =

Stefanówka may refer to the following places:

- Stefanówka, Łódź Voivodeship (central Poland)
- Stefanówka, Gmina Józefów nad Wisłą in Opole County, Lublin Voivodeship (east Poland)
- Stefanówka, Świdnik County in Lublin Voivodeship (east Poland)
- Stefanówka, Masovian Voivodeship (east-central Poland)
