= Romanówka =

Romanówka may refer to the following places:

- Romanówka, Chełm County in Lublin Voivodeship (east Poland)
- Romanówka, Siemiatycze County in Podlaskie Voivodeship (north-east Poland)
- Romanówka, Sokółka County in Podlaskie Voivodeship (north-east Poland)
- Romanówka, Suwałki County in Podlaskie Voivodeship (north-east Poland)
- Romanówka, Łódź Voivodeship (central Poland)
- Romanówka, Gmina Krynice, Tomaszów County in Lublin Voivodeship (east Poland)
- Romanówka, Świętokrzyskie Voivodeship (south-central Poland)
