= Józef Życiński =

Polish philosopher, publicist and archbishop

- Archbishop of Lublin
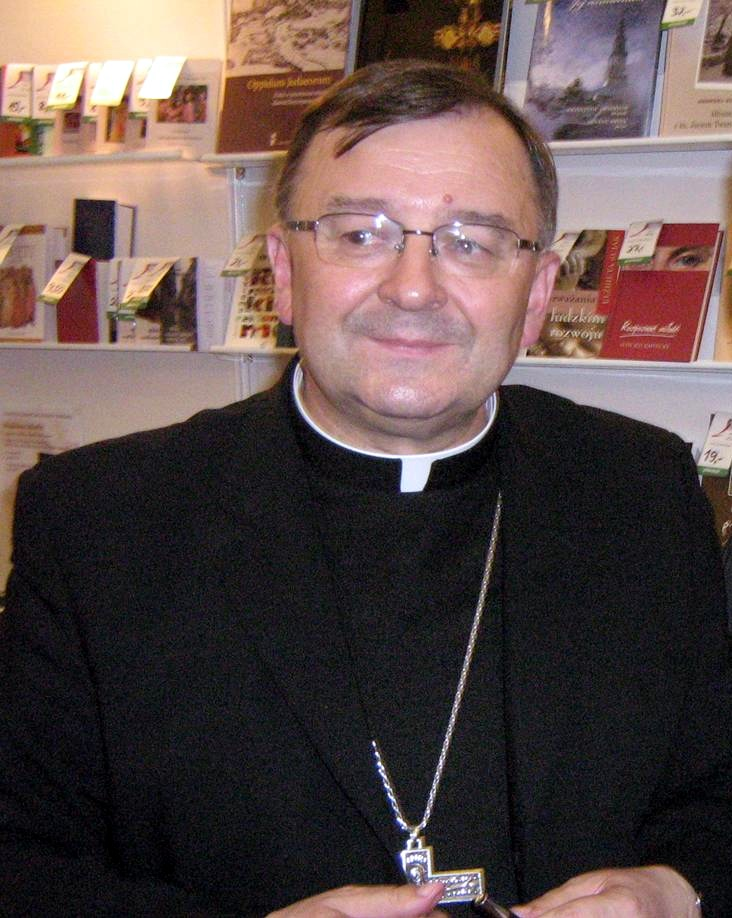
- Józef Życiński in 2008
- In office: June 14, 1997 – February 10, 2011
- Predecessor: Bolesław Pylak
- Successor: Stanisław Budzik
- Previous post: Bishop of Tarnów (1990–1997)

Orders
- Ordination: May 21, 1972 by Stefan Bareła
- Consecration: November 4, 1990 by Franciszek Macharski

Personal details
- Born: Józef Mirosław Życiński; September 1, 1948 Nowa Wieś, Poland
- Died: February 10, 2011 (aged 62) Rome, Italy
- Buried: St. John the Baptist Cathedral, Lublin
- Motto: In Spiritu et Veritate
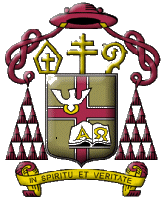
- Coat of arms

Józef Mirosław Życiński (1 September 1948 – 10 February 2011) was a Polish philosopher, publicist, the Roman Catholic metropolitan archbishop of the Archdiocese of Lublin and a professor of the Pontifical Academy of Theology in Rome, Pontifical University of John Paul II in Cracow and Catholic University of Lublin.

Życiński was born in Nowa Wieś. Between 1990 and 1997 he was the bishop of the Diocese of Tarnów. He died in Rome.

Życiński's notable published works include W kręgu nauki i wiary, Dylematy ewolucji, and Bóg Abrahama i Whiteheada.

== See also ==
- Catholic Church in Poland
