= Straszów =

Straszów may refer to the following places:

- Straszów, Łódź Voivodeship (central Poland)
- Straszów, Lubusz Voivodeship (west Poland)
- Straszów, Świętokrzyskie Voivodeship (south-central Poland)
