= Olędy =

Olędy may refer to the following places:

- Olędy, Gmina Mordy in Masovian Voivodeship (east-central Poland)
- Olędy, Gmina Zbuczyn in Masovian Voivodeship (east-central Poland)
- Olędy, Podlaskie Voivodeship (north-east Poland)
