= Cieślin =

Cieślin may refer to the following places:

- Cieślin, Kuyavian-Pomeranian Voivodeship (north-central Poland)
- Cieślin, Lesser Poland Voivodeship (south Poland)
- Cieślin, Łódź Voivodeship (central Poland)
- Cieślin, Masovian Voivodeship (east-central Poland)
