= Budy Porajskie =

- Village
- Location within Poland
- Coordinates: 51°15′N 19°32′E
- Country: Poland
- Voivodeship: Łódź
- County: Piotrków
- Gmina: Rozprza

Budy Porajskie [ˈbudɨ pɔˈrai̯skʲɛ] is a village in the administrative district of Gmina Rozprza, within Piotrków County, Łódź Voivodeship, in central Poland.
