= Rozprza =

- Town
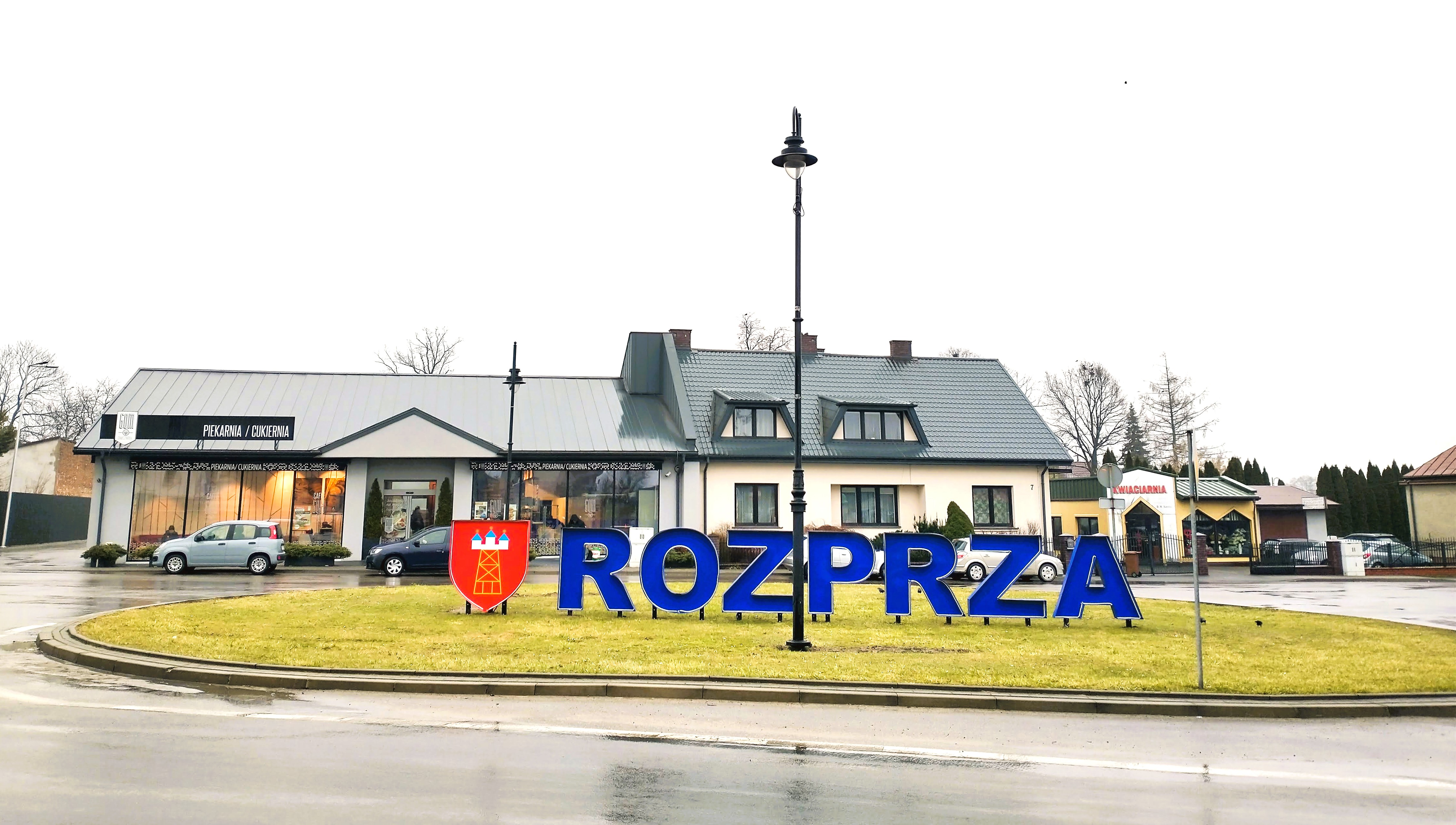

- Location within Poland
- Coordinates: 51°18′N 19°38′E
- Country: Poland
- Voivodeship: Łódź
- County: Piotrków
- Gmina: Rozprza

Population
  - Total: 1,400
- Time zone: UTC+1 (CET)
  - Summer (DST): UTC+2 (CEST)
- Vehicle registration: EPI

Rozprza [ˈrɔspʂa] is a town in Piotrków County, Łódź Voivodeship, in central Poland. It is the seat of the gmina (administrative district) called Gmina Rozprza. It lies approximately 12 km (7 mi) south of Piotrków Trybunalski and 55 km (34 mi) south of the regional capital Łódź. It is located in the Sieradz Land.

== History ==
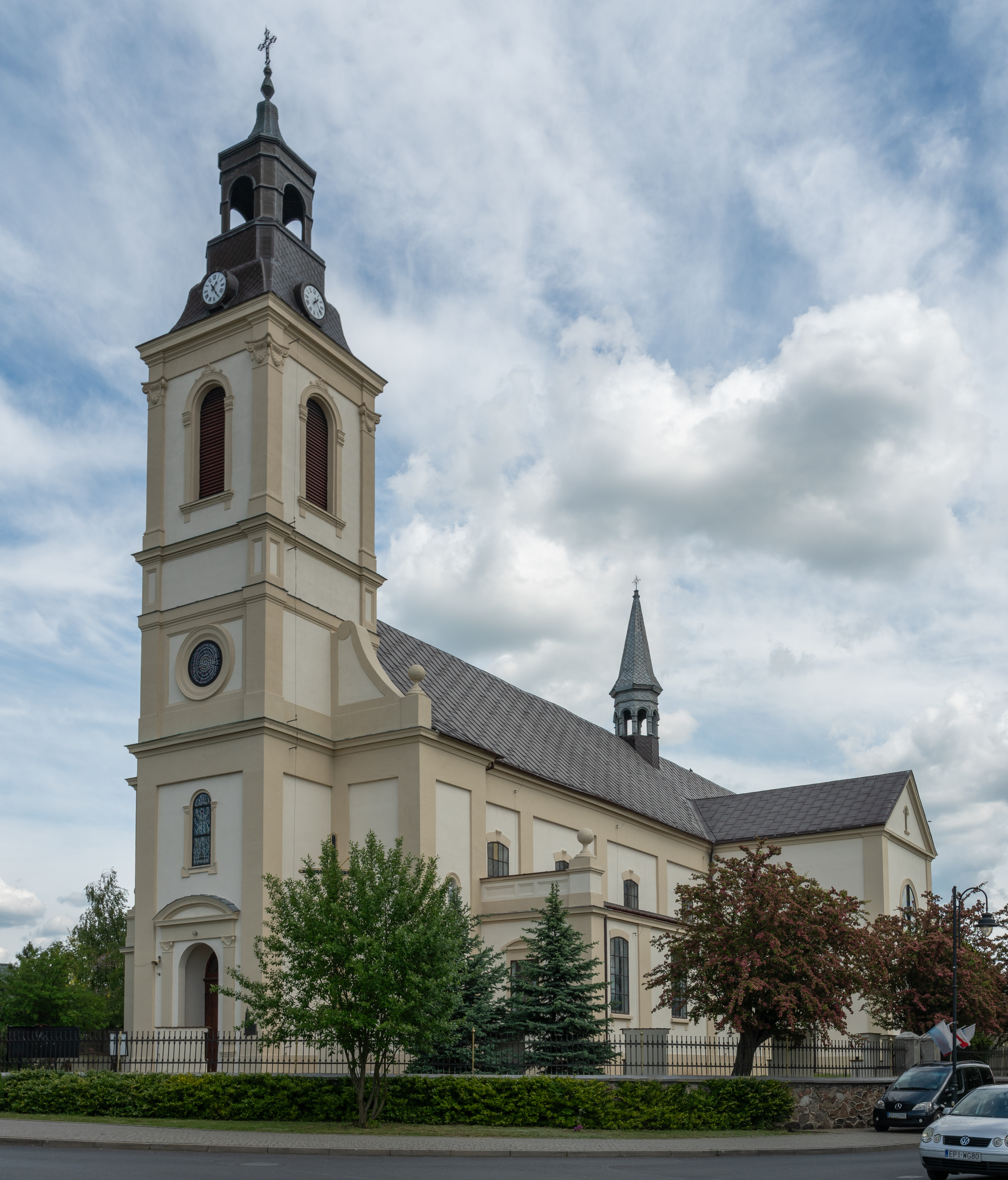
Church of the Visitation of the Blessed Virgin Mary

Rozprza is one of the oldest Slavic gords of Poland. It used to be the seat of a castellan, and its name probably comes from the Old Slavic word "rozprza", which means the subject of an argument, and which indicates that in the early Middle Ages Rozprza had a castellan court.

In the early years of Polish statehood, this part of central Poland belonged to the Province of Łęczyca, and the province itself was divided into eight castellanies, one of which was seated at Rozprza. The Rozprza Castellany had the area of 1,150 km^{2} (440 sq mi), and its southern part was uninhabited. In the early Middle Ages, Rozprza was located at the intersection of two busy merchant routes, from Gdańsk to Kraków, and from Rus to Sieradz and Kalisz. The gord itself lied at the edge of a large wilderness, and served as a toll collection point for merchants and their wagons. The gord of Rozprza was probably established in the 6th century, to be destroyed in unknown circumstances in the 9th century. A new stronghold was built in the same spot, which was probably destroyed by the Polans in the mid-10th century.

In the second half of the 10th century, a system of the so-called service villages was established in Polish castellanies. In the Castellany of Rozprza there were such villages as Woźniki (manufacture of wagons), Piekary (bread baking), Bartodzieje (honey making), and Ciesle (woodworking). Rozprza itself was completely remodelled, with a new 12-meter wide moat and a wide rampart. Altogether the defensive system of the gord was some 30 meter wide. First documented mention of Rozprza comes from the year 1065, when during the reign of King Bolesław II the Generous, Rozprza was obliged to pay a fee to a Benedictine Abbey at Mogilno. In the Bull of Gniezno (1136), Rozprza is described as an important center of trade, commerce and administration.

Rozprza was destroyed in the mid-13th century, probably during the Mongol invasion of Poland. The stronghold was quickly rebuilt, with a large garrison, which is confirmed by archaeological findings. Finally, west of the gord, the town of Rozprza was established before the year 1344. Due to proximity of quickly developing Piotrków Trybunalski, Rozprza remained a small town, whose population was app. 300 in the late 18th century. It was a private town, administratively located in the Piotrków County in the Sieradz Voivodeship in the Greater Poland Province of the Kingdom of Poland.

During the Second Partition of Poland, Rozprza was annexed by the Kingdom of Prussia. In 1807, it was regained by Poles and included within the short-lived Duchy of Warsaw. Following its dissolution, from 1815 until 1915, it was part of Russian-controlled Congress Poland. In 1846–47, Rozprza received rail connection due to construction of the Warsaw–Vienna railway. Following the January Uprising, Rozprza lost its town charter and has remained a village. Following World War I, in 1918, Poland regained independence and control of Rozprza.

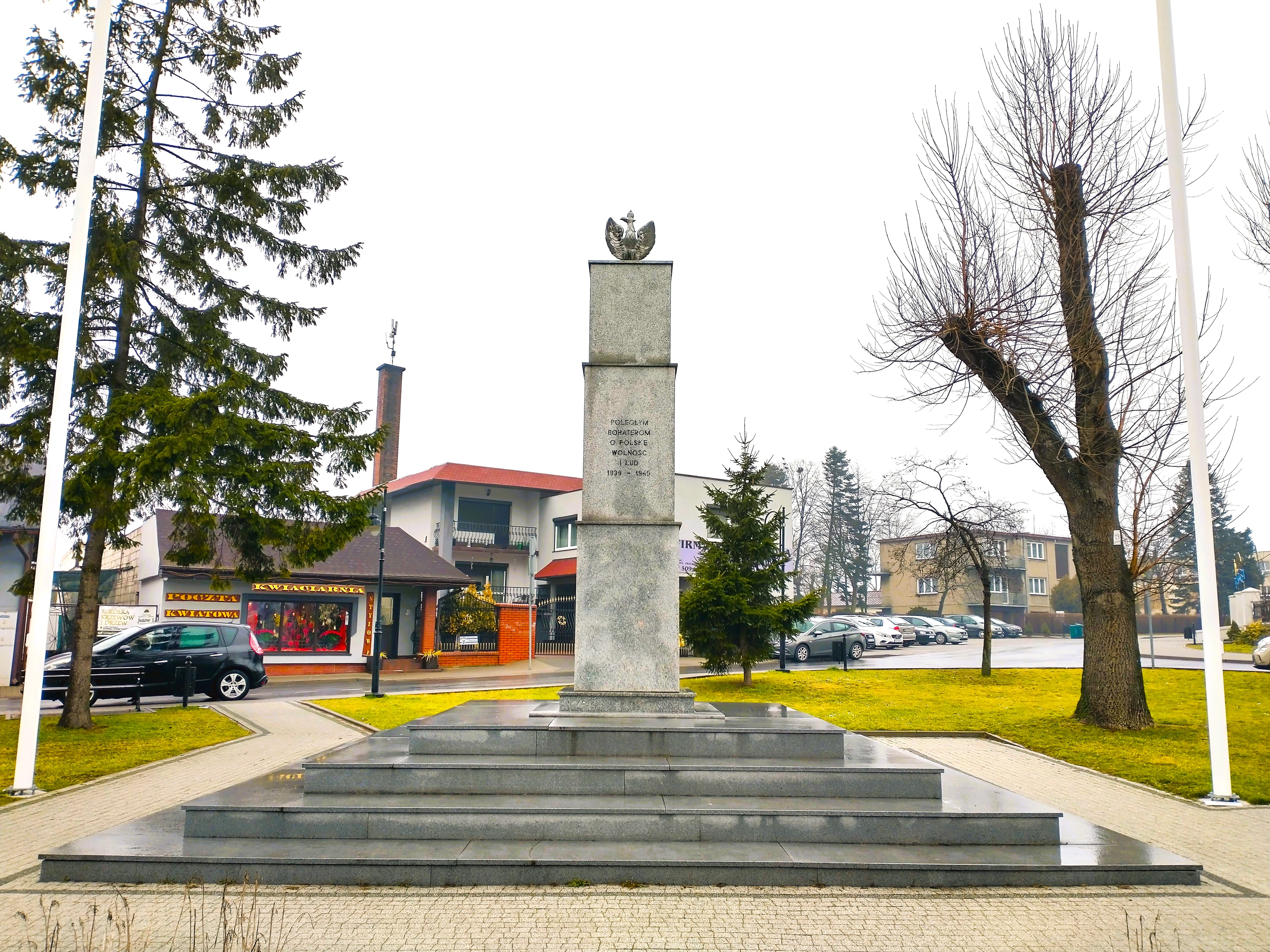
World War II memorial

Following the German-Soviet invasion of Poland, which started World War II in September 1939, Rozprza was occupied by the Germany until 1945. Several Poles, who were either born or lived and worked in Rozprza, were murdered by the Russians in the Katyn massacre in 1940.

In 2023, Rozprza regained its town charter.

== Transport ==
There is a train station in the town.

== Notable people ==
- Józef Pawlikowski (1767–1828), Polish writer, publicist and political activist
