= Biała Róża, Łódź Voivodeship =

Village in Gmina Rozprza, Poland

Biała Róża
- Village
- Location within Poland
- Coordinates: 51°15′41″N 19°32′43″E
- Country: Poland
- Voivodeship: Łódź
- County: Piotrków
- Gmina: Rozprza

Biała Róża [ˈbjawa ˈruʐa] is a village in the administrative district of Gmina Rozprza, within Piotrków County, Łódź Voivodeship, in central Poland.
