= Radzików-Wieś =

- Village
- Location within Poland
- Coordinates: 52°15′56″N 20°38′40″E
- Country: Poland
- Voivodeship: Masovian
- County: Warsaw West
- Gmina: Błonie
- Population: 927

Radzików-Wieś (Polish pronunciation: [raˈdʑikuv ˈvjɛɕ]) is a village in the administrative district of Gmina Błonie, within Warsaw West County, Masovian Voivodeship, in east-central Poland.

== See also ==
- Radzików
