= Gmina Mordy =

Gmina Mordy Mordy Commune
- Gmina
- Coat of arms
- Interactive map of Gmina Mordy
- Coordinates (Mordy): 52°12′29″N 22°30′43″E
- Country: Poland
- Voivodeship: Masovian
- County: Siedlce County
- Seat: Mordy

Area
  - Total: 170.17 km^{2} (65.70 sq mi)

Population (2014)
  - Total: 6,017
  - Density: 35.36/km^{2} (91.58/sq mi)
  - Urban: 1,797
  - Rural: 4,220
- Website: http://www.mordy.pl/

Gmina Mordy is an urban-rural gmina (administrative district) in Siedlce County, Masovian Voivodeship, in east-central Poland. Its seat is the town of Mordy, which lies approximately 18 kilometres (11 mi) east of Siedlce and 104 km (65 mi) east of Warsaw.

The gmina covers an area of 170.17 square kilometres (65.7 sq mi), and as of 2006 its total population is 6,284 (out of which the population of Mordy amounts to 1,840, and the population of the rural part of the gmina is 4,444).

== Villages ==
Apart from the town of Mordy, Gmina Mordy contains the villages and settlements of Czepielin, Czepielin-Kolonia, Czołomyje, Doliwo, Głuchów, Klimonty, Kolonia Mordy, Krzymosze, Leśniczówka, Ogrodniki, Olędy, Ostoje, Pieńki, Pióry Wielkie, Pióry-Pytki, Płosodrza, Ptaszki, Radzików Wielki, Radzików-Kornica, Radzików-Oczki, Radzików-Stopki, Rogóziec, Sosenki-Jajki, Stara Wieś, Stok Ruski, Suchodół Wielki, Suchodołek, Wielgorz, Wojnów, Wólka Soseńska, Wólka-Biernaty and Wyczółki.

== Neighbouring gminas ==
Gmina Mordy is bordered by the city of Siedlce and by the gminas of Łosice, Olszanka, Paprotnia, Przesmyki, Siedlce, Suchożebry and Zbuczyn.
