= Pióry Wielkie =

- Village
- Location within Poland
- Coordinates: 52°8′N 22°33′E
- Country: Poland
- Voivodeship: Masovian
- County: Siedlce
- Gmina: Mordy

Pióry Wielkie [ˈpjurɨ ˈvjɛlkʲɛ] is a village in the administrative district of Gmina Mordy, within Siedlce County, Masovian Voivodeship, in east-central Poland.
