= Cekanów, Piotrków County =

Cekanów
- Village
- Location within Poland
- Coordinates: 51°19′14″N 19°41′3″E
- Country: Poland
- Voivodeship: Łódź
- County: Piotrków
- Gmina: Rozprza

Cekanów [t͡sɛˈkanuf] is a village in the administrative district of Gmina Rozprza, within Piotrków County, Łódź Voivodeship, in central Poland.
