= Budy, Łódź Voivodeship =

Budy
- Village
- Location within Poland
- Coordinates: 51°16′18″N 19°37′33″E
- Country: Poland
- Voivodeship: Łódź
- County: Piotrków
- Gmina: Rozprza

Budy [ˈbudɨ] is a village in the administrative district of Gmina Rozprza, within Piotrków County, Łódź Voivodeship, in central Poland.
