= Mierzyn-Kolonia =

- Village
- Location within Poland
- Coordinates: 51°14′51″N 19°41′58″E
- Country: Poland
- Voivodeship: Łódź
- County: Piotrków
- Gmina: Rozprza

Mierzyn-Kolonia [ˈmjɛʐɨn kɔˈlɔɲa] is a village in the administrative district of Gmina Rozprza, within Piotrków County, Łódź Voivodeship, in central Poland.
