= Bogumiłów, Piotrków County =

Bogumiłów
- Village
- Location within Poland
- Coordinates: 51°18′7″N 19°35′41″E
- Country: Poland
- Voivodeship: Łódź
- County: Piotrków
- Gmina: Rozprza

Bogumiłów [bɔɡuˈmiwuf] is a village in the administrative district of Gmina Rozprza, within Piotrków County, Łódź Voivodeship, in central Poland.
