= Bryszki =

- Village
- Location within Poland
- Coordinates: 51°16′N 19°40′E
- Country: Poland
- Voivodeship: Łódź
- County: Piotrków
- Gmina: Rozprza

Bryszki [ˈbrɨʂki] is a village in the administrative district of Gmina Rozprza, within Piotrków County, Łódź Voivodeship, in central Poland.
