= Magdalenka, Piotrków County =

Magdalenka
- Village
- Location within Poland
- Coordinates: 51°18′35″N 19°37′11″E
- Country: Poland
- Voivodeship: Łódź
- County: Piotrków
- Gmina: Rozprza

Magdalenka [maɡdaˈlɛŋka] is a village in the administrative district of Gmina Rozprza, within Piotrków County, Łódź Voivodeship, in central Poland.
