= Wojnów, Masovian Voivodeship =

Wojnów
- Village
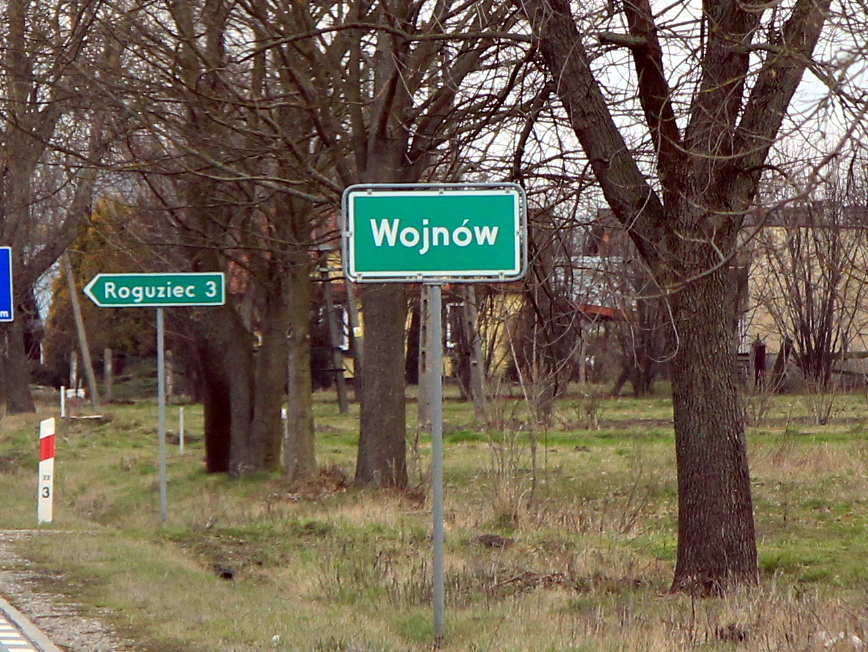

- Location within Poland
- Coordinates: 52°13′N 22°35′E
- Country: Poland
- Voivodeship: Masovian
- County: Siedlce
- Gmina: Mordy
- Time zone: UTC+1 (CET)
  - Summer (DST): UTC+2 (CEST)

Wojnów [ˈvɔi̯nuf] is a village in the administrative district of Gmina Mordy, within Siedlce County, Masovian Voivodeship, in east-central Poland.

Six Polish citizens were murdered by Nazi Germany in the village during World War II.
