= Nowa Wola Niechcicka =

- Village
- Location within Poland
- Coordinates: 51°15′57″N 19°34′46″E
- Country: Poland
- Voivodeship: Łódź
- County: Piotrków
- Gmina: Rozprza
- Population: 240

Nowa Wola Niechcicka [ˈnɔva ˈvɔla ɲɛxˈt͡ɕit͡ska] is a village in the administrative district of Gmina Rozprza, within Piotrków County, Łódź Voivodeship, in central Poland.
