= Józef Pawlikowski =

Polish noble and political activist

Józef Pawlikowski (baptized 28 March 1767 in Rozprza – 1828 in Warsaw) was a Polish noble (from an impoverished noble family) and political activist. One of the Polish Jacobins; secretary of Tadeusz Kościuszko in 1795 in France. An independence activist in Congress Poland, he was arrested in 1826 and died in prison in 1828.
