= Radzików-Stopki =

- Village
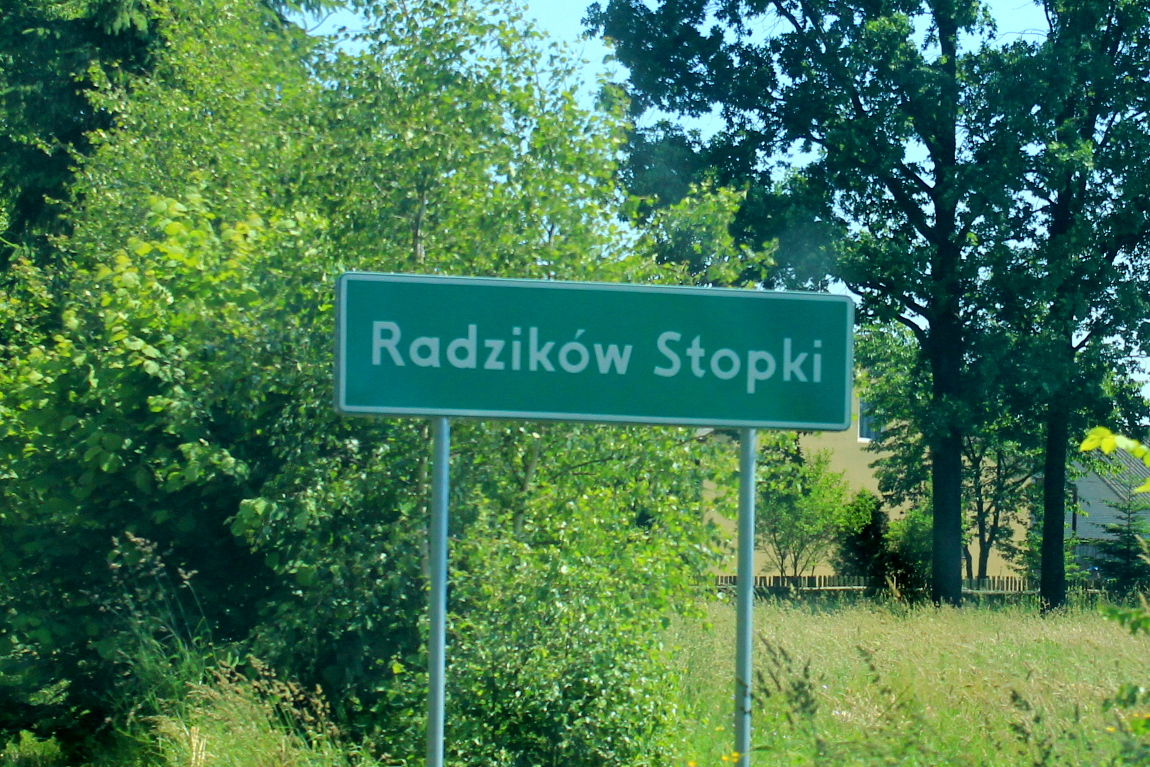
- Road sign in Radzików-Stopki

- Location within Poland
- Coordinates: 52°09′22″N 22°30′07″E
- Country: Poland
- Voivodeship: Masovian
- County: Siedlce
- Gmina: Mordy
- Vehicle registration: WSI

Radzików-Stopki (Polish pronunciation: [raˈdʑikuf ˈstɔpkʲi]) is a village in the administrative district of Gmina Mordy, within Siedlce County, Masovian Voivodeship, in east-central Poland.

== History ==
In 1827 the village had a population of 109.

Following the joint German-Soviet invasion of Poland, which started World War II in September 1939, the village was occupied by Germany. On April 10, 1943, the German gendarmerie executed three Poles, aged 30, 35 and 70, accused of sheltering Jews and Soviet POWs who escaped from German captivity.

== See also ==
- Radzików, other places called Radzików
- Stopki, in Warmian-Masurian Voivodeship (northern Poland)
