= Stara Wola Niechcicka =

Wola Niechcicka Stara
- Village
- Location within Poland
- Coordinates: 51°16′N 19°34′E
- Country: Poland
- Voivodeship: Łódź
- County: Piotrków
- Gmina: Rozprza

Wola Niechcicka Stara [ˈstara ˈvɔla ɲɛxˈt͡ɕit͡ska] is a village in the administrative district of Gmina Rozprza, within Piotrków County, Łódź Voivodeship, in central Poland.
