= Milejów, Piotrków County =

Milejów
- Village
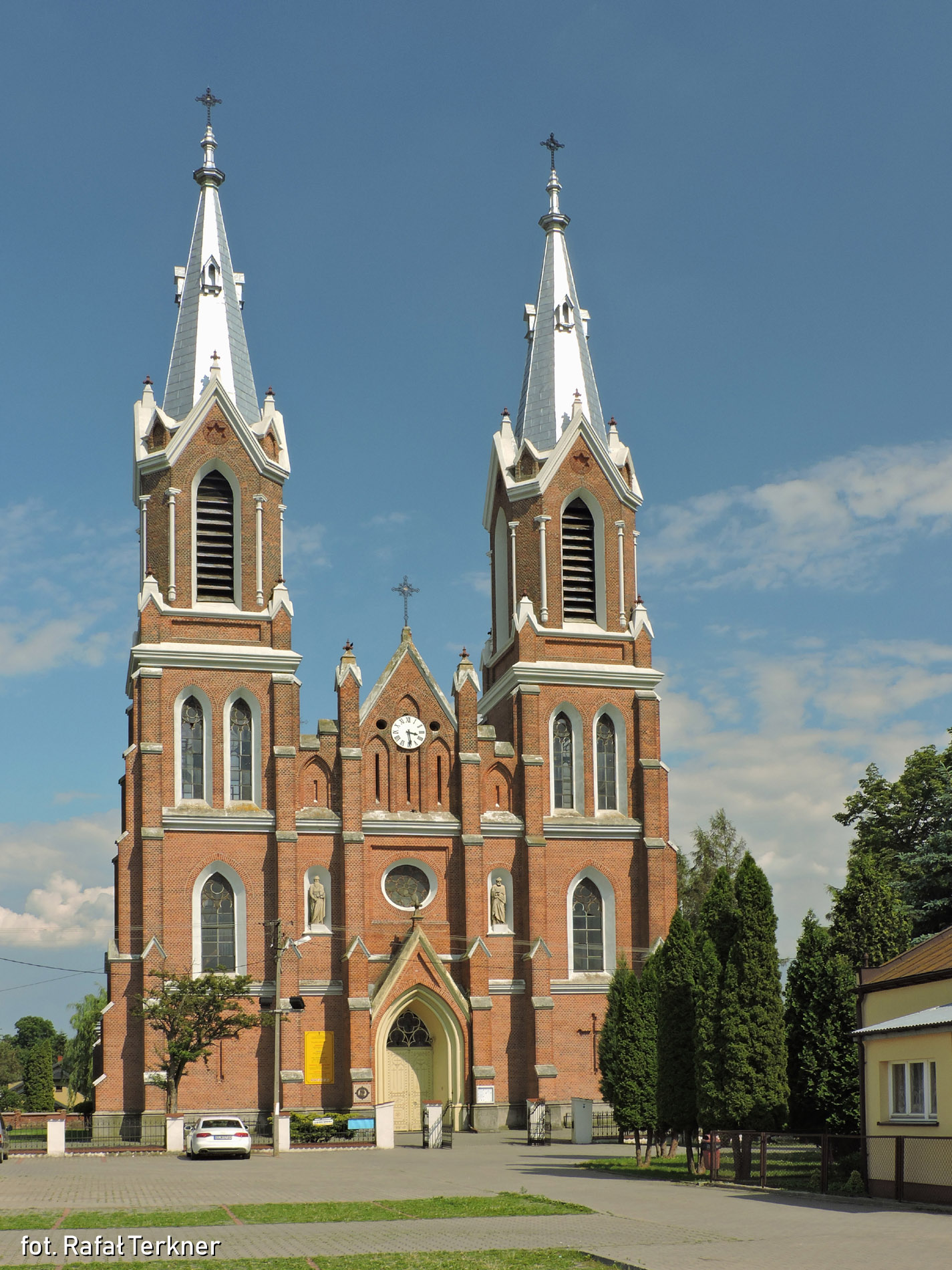
- Catholic Church

- Location within Poland
- Coordinates: 51°20′50″N 19°42′30″E
- Country: Poland
- Voivodeship: Łódź
- County: Piotrków
- Gmina: Rozprza

Milejów [miˈlɛjuf] is a village in the administrative district of Gmina Rozprza, within Piotrków County, Łódź Voivodeship, in central Poland.
