= Czepielin-Kolonia =

- Village
- Location within Poland
- Coordinates: 52°14′13″N 22°23′09″E
- Country: Poland
- Voivodeship: Masovian
- County: Siedlce
- Gmina: Mordy

Czepielin-Kolonia [t͡ʂɛˈpjɛlin kɔˈlɔɲa] is a village in the administrative district of Gmina Mordy, within Siedlce County, Masovian Voivodeship, in east-central Poland.
