= Kornica =

Kornica may refer to:

- Kornica, Bosnia and Herzegovina, a village near Šamac, Bosnia
- Kornica, Świętokrzyskie Voivodeship, a village in Poland
- Kórnica, Opole Voivodeship, a village in Poland

== See also ==
- Radzików-Kornica, a village in Masovian Voivodeship, Poland
