= Gmina Rozprza =

Gmina Rozprza Rozprza Commune
- Gmina
- Coat of arms
- Interactive map of Gmina Rozprza
- Coordinates (Rozprza): 51°18′N 19°38′E
- Country: Poland
- Voivodeship: Łódź
- County: Piotrków County
- Seat: Rozprza

Area
  - Total: 162.5 km^{2} (62.7 sq mi)

Population (2006)
  - Total: 12,039
  - Density: 74.09/km^{2} (191.9/sq mi)
- Website: http://www.rozprza.pl/

Gmina Rozprza is a rural gmina (administrative district) in Piotrków County, Łódź Voivodeship, in central Poland. Its seat is the village of Rozprza, which lies approximately 12 kilometres (7 mi) south of Piotrków Trybunalski and 55 km (34 mi) south of the regional capital Łódź.

The gmina covers an area of 162.5 square kilometres (62.7 sq mi), and as of 2006 its total population is 12,039.

== Villages ==
Gmina Rozprza contains the villages and settlements of Adolfinów, Bagno, Bazar, Biała Róża, Białocin, Bogumiłów, Bryszki, Budy, Budy Porajskie, Cekanów, Cieślin, Dzięciary, Gieski, Ignaców, Janówka, Kęszyn, Kisiele, Łazy Duże, Łochyńsko, Longinówka, Lubień, Magdalenka, Mierzyn, Mierzyn-Kolonia, Milejów, Milejowiec, Nowa Wieś, Nowa Wola Niechcicka, Pieńki, Rajsko Duże, Rajsko Małe, Romanówka, Rozprza, Stara Wieś, Stara Wola Niechcicka, Stefanówka, Straszów, Straszówek, Świerczyńsko, Truszczanek, Wroników and Zmożna Wola.

== Neighbouring gminas ==
Gmina Rozprza is bordered by the city of Piotrków Trybunalski and by the gminas of Gorzkowice, Kamieńsk, Łęki Szlacheckie, Ręczno, Sulejów and Wola Krzysztoporska.
