= Longinówka =

- Village
- Location within Poland
- Coordinates: 51°22′N 19°42′E
- Country: Poland
- Voivodeship: Łódź
- County: Piotrków
- Gmina: Rozprza

Population
  - Total: 554
- Time zone: UTC+1 (CET)
  - Summer (DST): UTC+2 (CEST)
- Vehicle registration: EPI

Longinówka [lɔŋɡiˈnufka] is a village in the administrative district of Gmina Rozprza, within Piotrków County, Łódź Voivodeship, in central Poland.

== History ==
According to the 1921 census, the village had a population of 645, entirely Polish by nationality and Roman Catholic by confession.

During the joint German-Soviet invasion of Poland, which started World War II in September 1939, the Germans locked up several captured Polish prisoners of war in a house in the village, then set it on fire and burned the Poles alive (see also Nazi crimes against the Polish nation).
