= Czepielin =

- Village
- Location within Poland
- Coordinates: 52°13′N 22°24′E
- Country: Poland
- Voivodeship: Masovian
- County: Siedlce
- Gmina: Mordy
- Population: 360

Czepielin [t͡ʂɛˈpjɛlin] is a village in the administrative district of Gmina Mordy, within Siedlce County, Masovian Voivodeship, in east-central Poland.
