= Ptaszki =

- Village
- Location within Poland
- Coordinates: 52°10′N 22°34′E
- Country: Poland
- Voivodeship: Masovian
- County: Siedlce
- Gmina: Mordy

Ptaszki [ˈptaʂki] is a village in the administrative district of Gmina Mordy, within Siedlce County, Masovian Voivodeship, in east-central Poland.
