= Mierzyn, Łódź Voivodeship =

Mierzyn
- Village
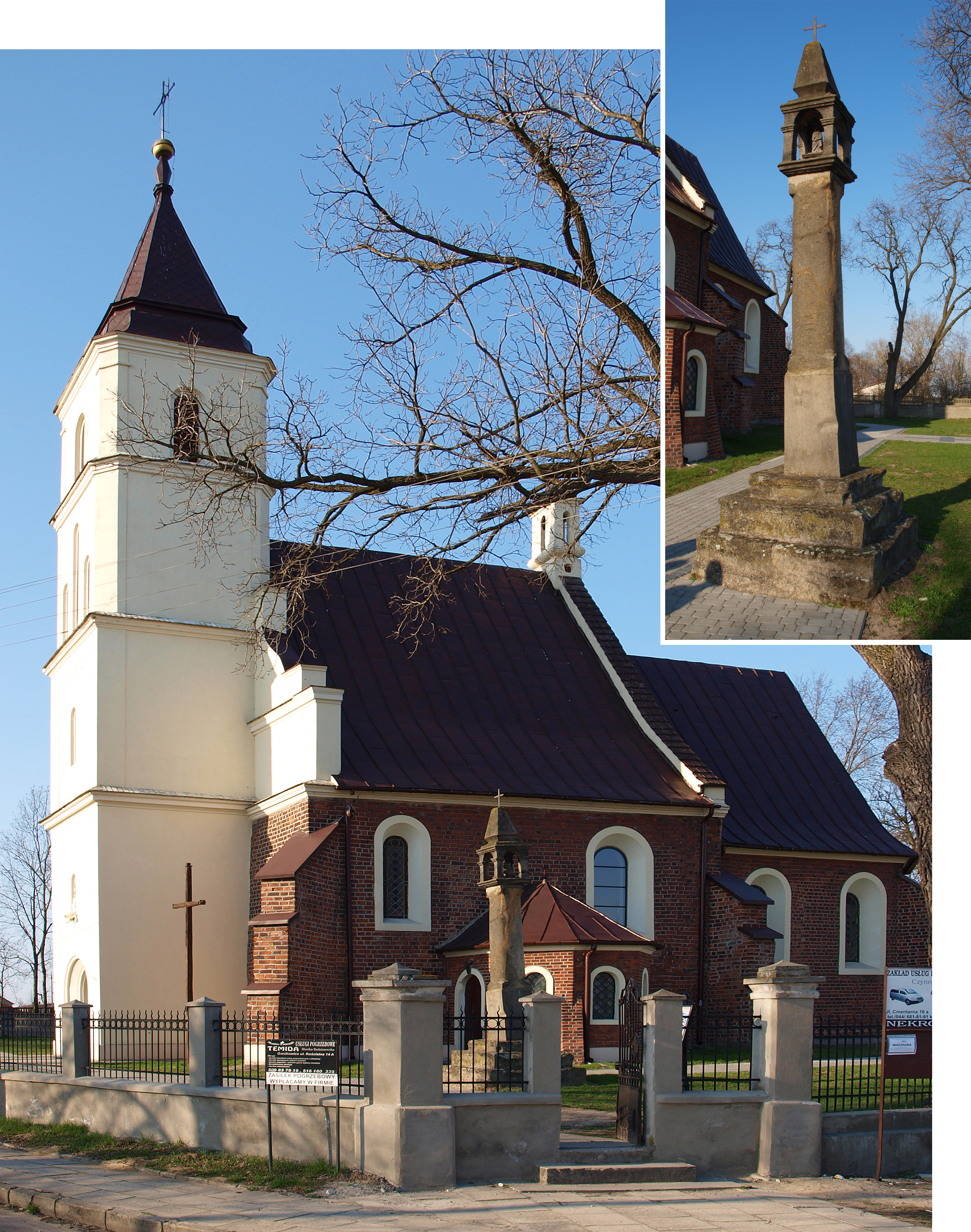
- Church

- Location within Poland
- Coordinates: 51°15′N 19°41′E
- Country: Poland
- Voivodeship: Łódź
- County: Piotrków
- Gmina: Rozprza

Mierzyn [ˈmjɛʐɨn] is a village in the administrative district of Gmina Rozprza, within Piotrków County, Łódź Voivodeship, in central Poland.
