= Łazy Duże, Łódź Voivodeship =

Łazy Duże
- Village
- Location within Poland
- Coordinates: 51°19′N 19°44′E
- Country: Poland
- Voivodeship: Łódź
- County: Piotrków
- Gmina: Rozprza

Łazy Duże [ˈwazɨ ˈduʐɛ] is a village in the administrative district of Gmina Rozprza, within Piotrków County, Łódź Voivodeship, in central Poland.
