= Krzymosze =

- Village
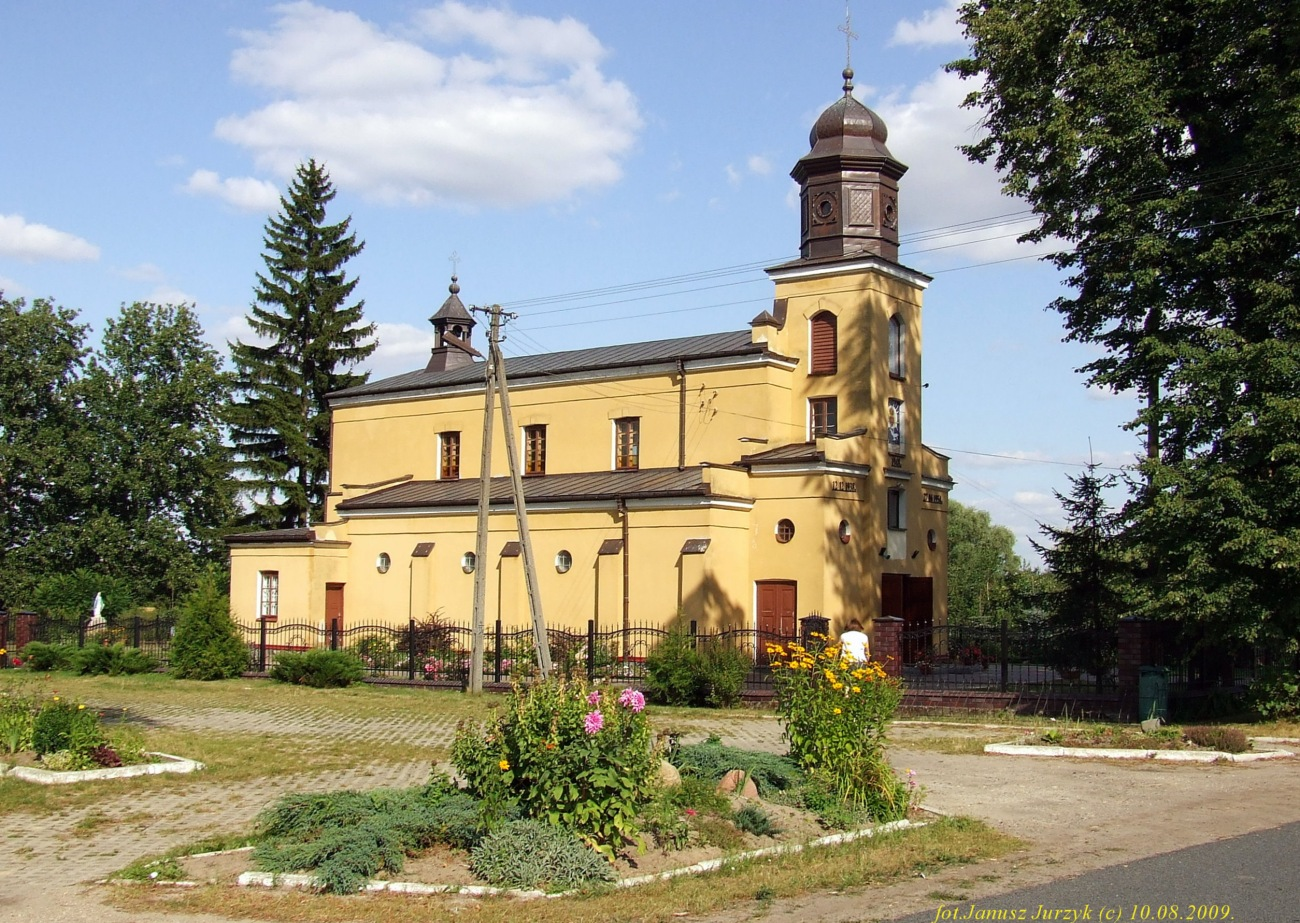
- Sacred Heart church in Krzymosze

- Location within Poland
- Coordinates: 52°10′N 22°28′E
- Country: Poland
- Voivodeship: Masovian
- County: Siedlce
- Gmina: Mordy
- Time zone: UTC+1 (CET)
  - Summer (DST): UTC+2 (CEST)
- Vehicle registration: WSI

Krzymosze [kʂɨˈmɔʂɛ] is a village in the administrative district of Gmina Mordy, within Siedlce County, Masovian Voivodeship, in east-central Poland.

Nine Polish citizens were murdered by Nazi Germany in the village during World War II.
