= Leśniczówka, Siedlce County =

Leśniczówka
- Village
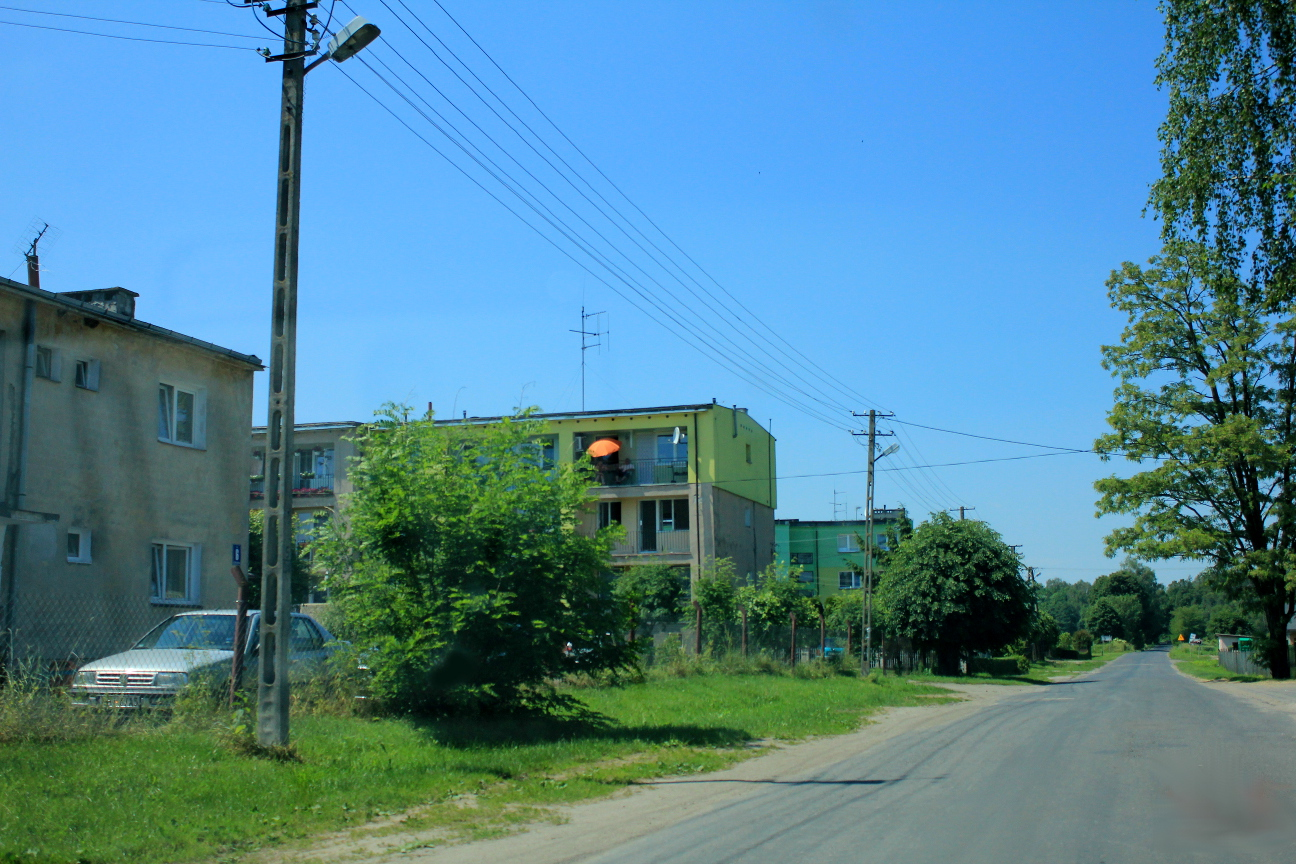
- Roadside houses in Leśniczówka

- Location within Poland
- Coordinates: 52°10′00″N 22°27′18″E
- Country: Poland
- Voivodeship: Masovian
- County: Siedlce
- Gmina: Mordy

Leśniczówka (Polish pronunciation: [lɛɕɲiˈtʂufka]) is a village in the administrative district of Gmina Mordy, within Siedlce County, Masovian Voivodeship, in east-central Poland.
