= Wólka-Biernaty =

- Village
- Location within Poland
- Coordinates: 52°12′09″N 22°37′42″E
- Country: Poland
- Voivodeship: Masovian
- County: Siedlce
- Gmina: Mordy

Wólka-Biernaty [ˈvulka bjɛrˈnatɨ] is a village in the administrative district of Gmina Mordy, within Siedlce County, Masovian Voivodeship, in east-central Poland.
