= Radzików-Kornica =

- Village
- Location within Poland
- Coordinates: 52°08′24″N 22°30′38″E
- Country: Poland
- Voivodeship: Masovian
- County: Siedlce
- Gmina: Mordy

Radzików-Kornica [raˈd͡ʑikuf kɔrˈnit͡sa] is a village in the administrative district of Gmina Mordy, within Siedlce County, Masovian Voivodeship, in east-central Poland.

== See also ==
- Kornica
- Radzików
