= Radzików-Oczki =

- Village
- Location within Poland
- Coordinates: 52°08′40″N 22°31′03″E
- Country: Poland
- Voivodeship: Masovian
- County: Siedlce
- Gmina: Mordy

Radzików-Oczki (Polish pronunciation: [raˈdʑikuf ˈɔtʂkʲi]) is a village in the administrative district of Gmina Mordy, within Siedlce County, Masovian Voivodeship, in east-central Poland.

== See also ==
- Radzików
