= Stara Wieś, Piotrków County =

Stara Wieś
- Village
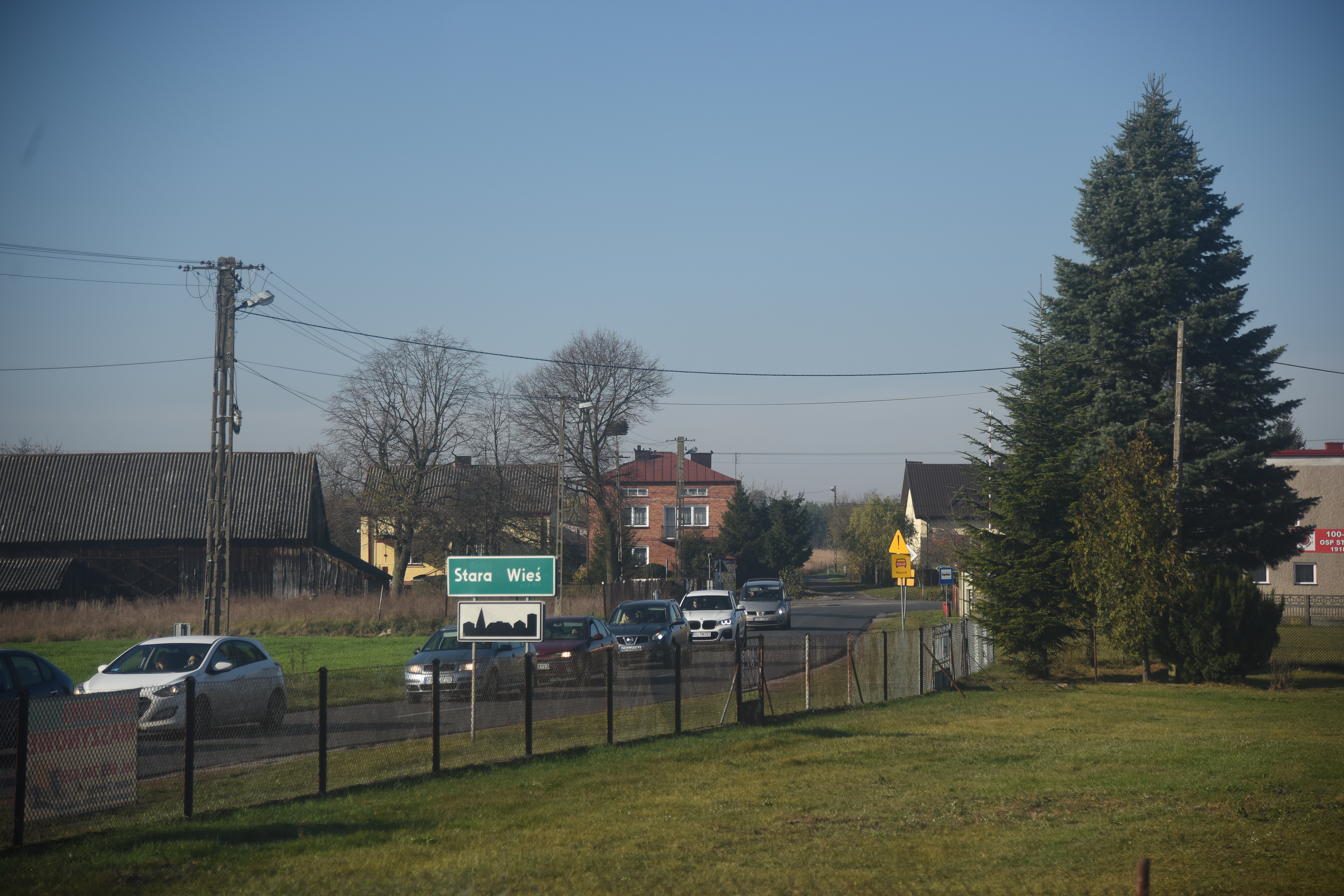

- Location within Poland
- Coordinates: 51°16′43″N 19°38′44″E
- Country: Poland
- Voivodeship: Łódź
- County: Piotrków
- Gmina: Rozprza

Stara Wieś [ˈstara ˈvjɛɕ] is a village in the administrative district of Gmina Rozprza, within Piotrków County, Łódź Voivodeship, in central Poland.
