= Lubień, Piotrków County =

Lubień
- Village
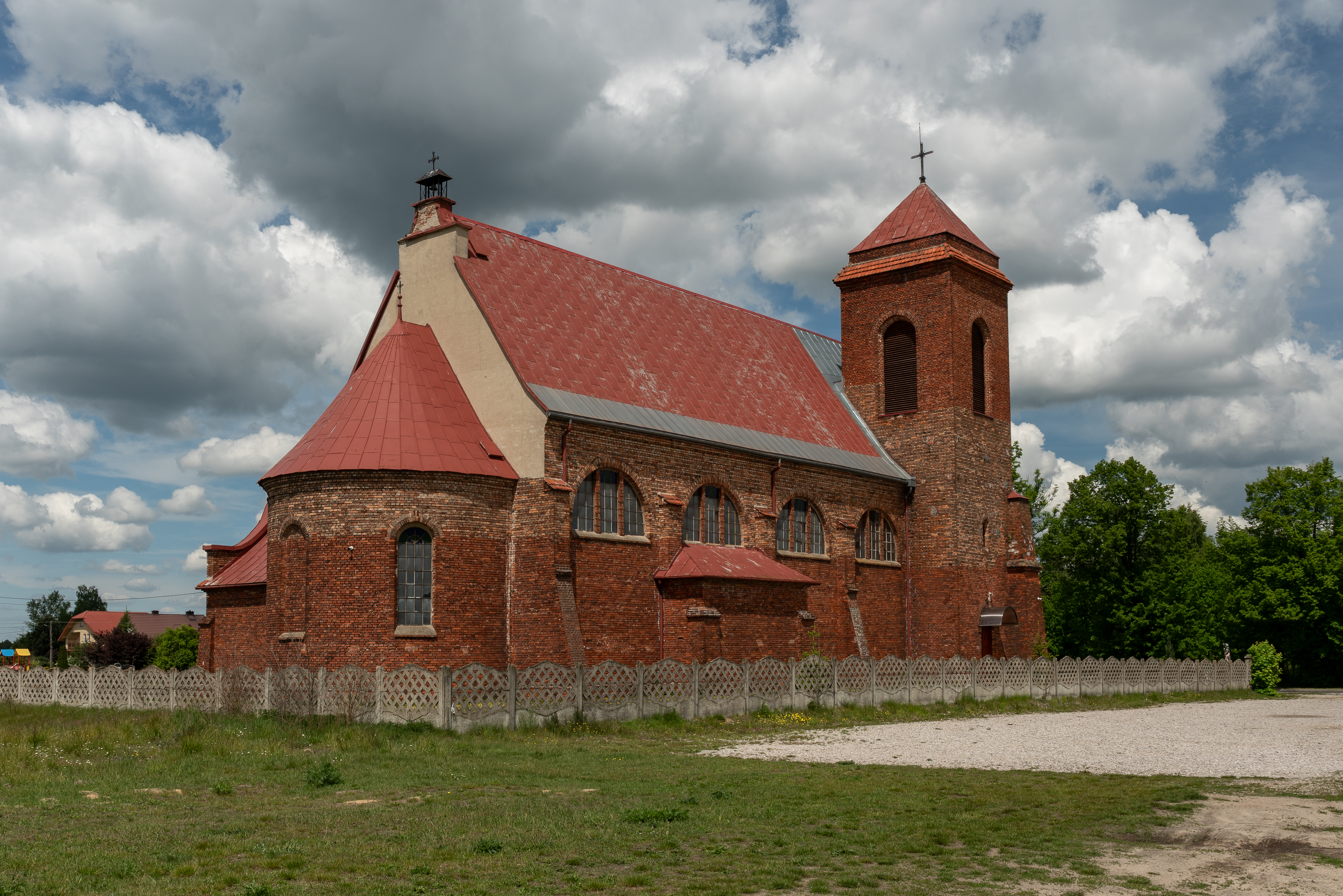
- Catholic church

- Location within Poland
- Coordinates: 51°16′N 19°47′E
- Country: Poland
- Voivodeship: Łódź
- County: Piotrków
- Gmina: Rozprza

Lubień (Polish pronunciation: [ˈlubjɛj̃]) is a village in the administrative district of Gmina Rozprza, within Piotrków County, Łódź Voivodeship, in central Poland.
