= Bazar, Łódź Voivodeship =

Bazar
- Village
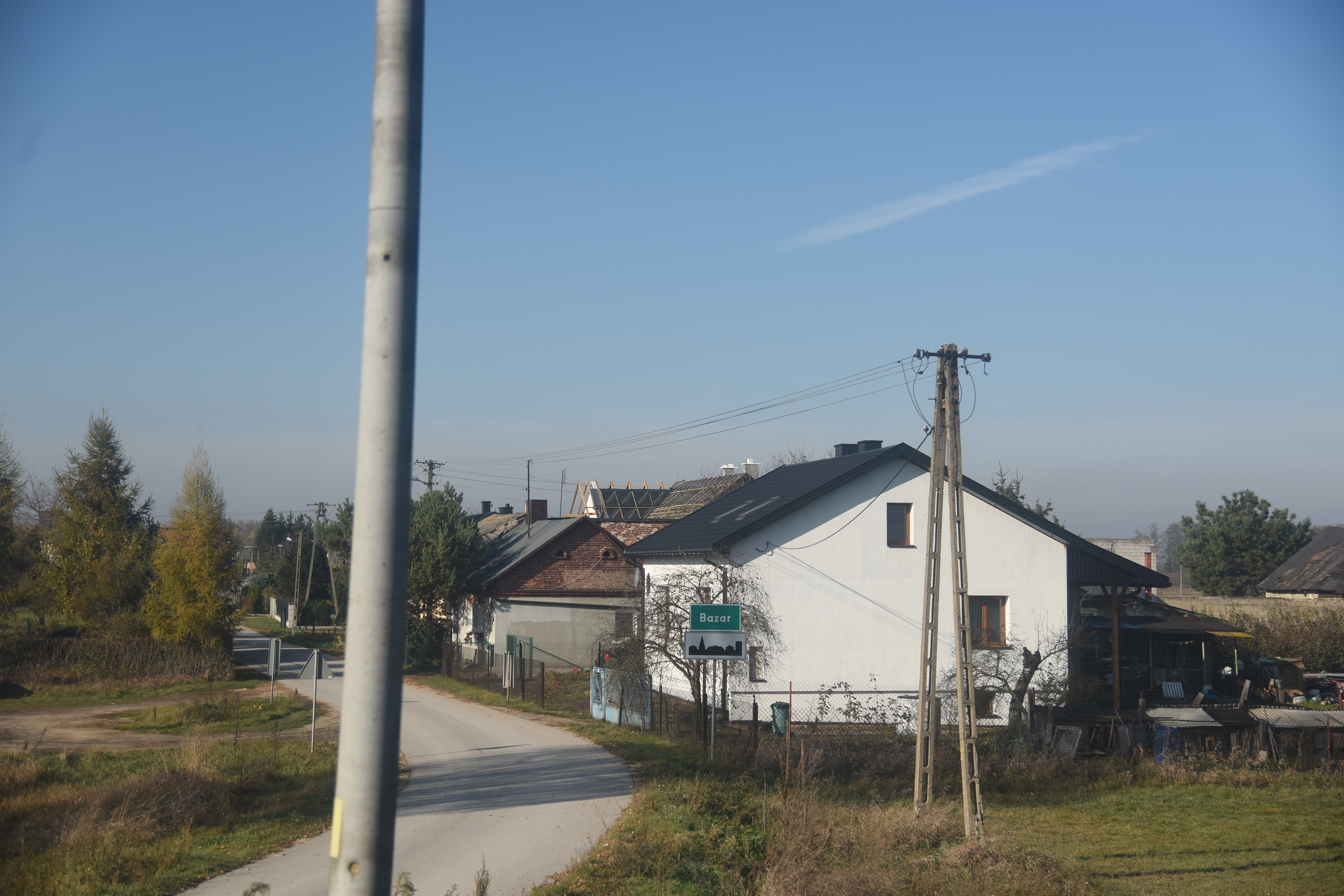

- Location within Poland
- Coordinates: 51°17′42″N 19°38′42″E
- Country: Poland
- Voivodeship: Łódź
- County: Piotrków
- Gmina: Rozprza

Bazar [ˈbazar] is a village in the administrative district of Gmina Rozprza, within Piotrków County, Łódź Voivodeship, in central Poland.
