= Pióry-Pytki =

- Village
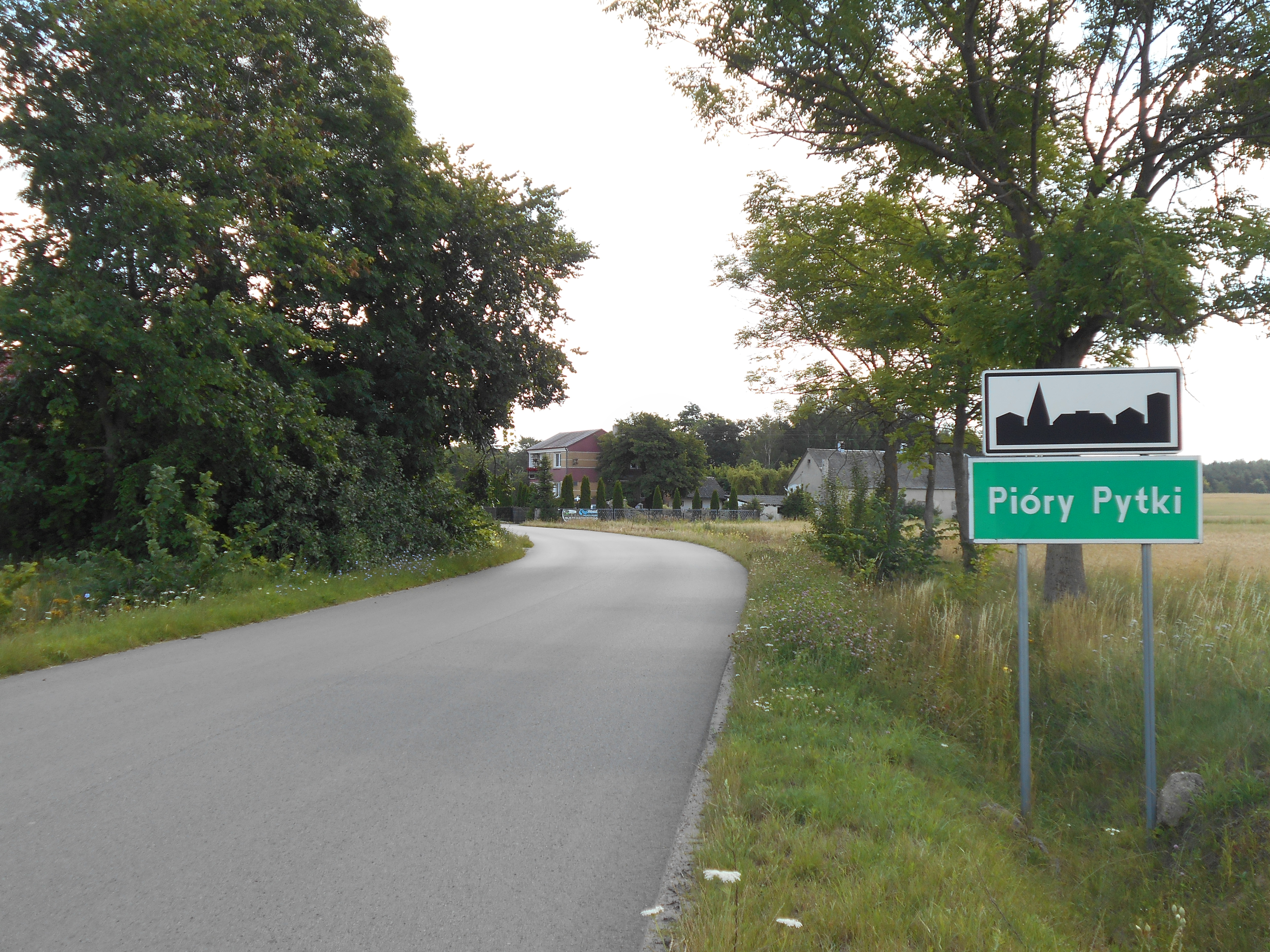

- Location within Poland
- Coordinates: 52°07′42″N 22°34′37″E
- Country: Poland
- Voivodeship: Masovian
- County: Siedlce
- Gmina: Mordy

Pióry-Pytki [ˈpjurɨ ˈpɨtki] is a village in the administrative district of Gmina Mordy, within Siedlce County, Masovian Voivodeship, in east-central Poland.
