= Suchodołek =

Village in Gmina Mordy, Poland

- Village
- Location within Poland
- Coordinates: 52°11′21″N 22°35′51″E
- Country: Poland
- Voivodeship: Masovian
- County: Siedlce
- Gmina: Mordy

Suchodołek [suxɔˈdɔwɛk] is a village in the administrative district of Gmina Mordy, within Siedlce County, Masovian Voivodeship, in east-central Poland.
