= Wyczółki, Siedlce County =

Wyczółki
- Village
- Location within Poland
- Coordinates: 52°11′8″N 22°25′53″E
- Country: Poland
- Voivodeship: Masovian
- County: Siedlce
- Gmina: Mordy

Wyczółki [vɨˈt͡ʂuu̯ki] is a village in the administrative district of Gmina Mordy, within Siedlce County, Masovian Voivodeship, in east-central Poland.
