= Stopki =

- Village
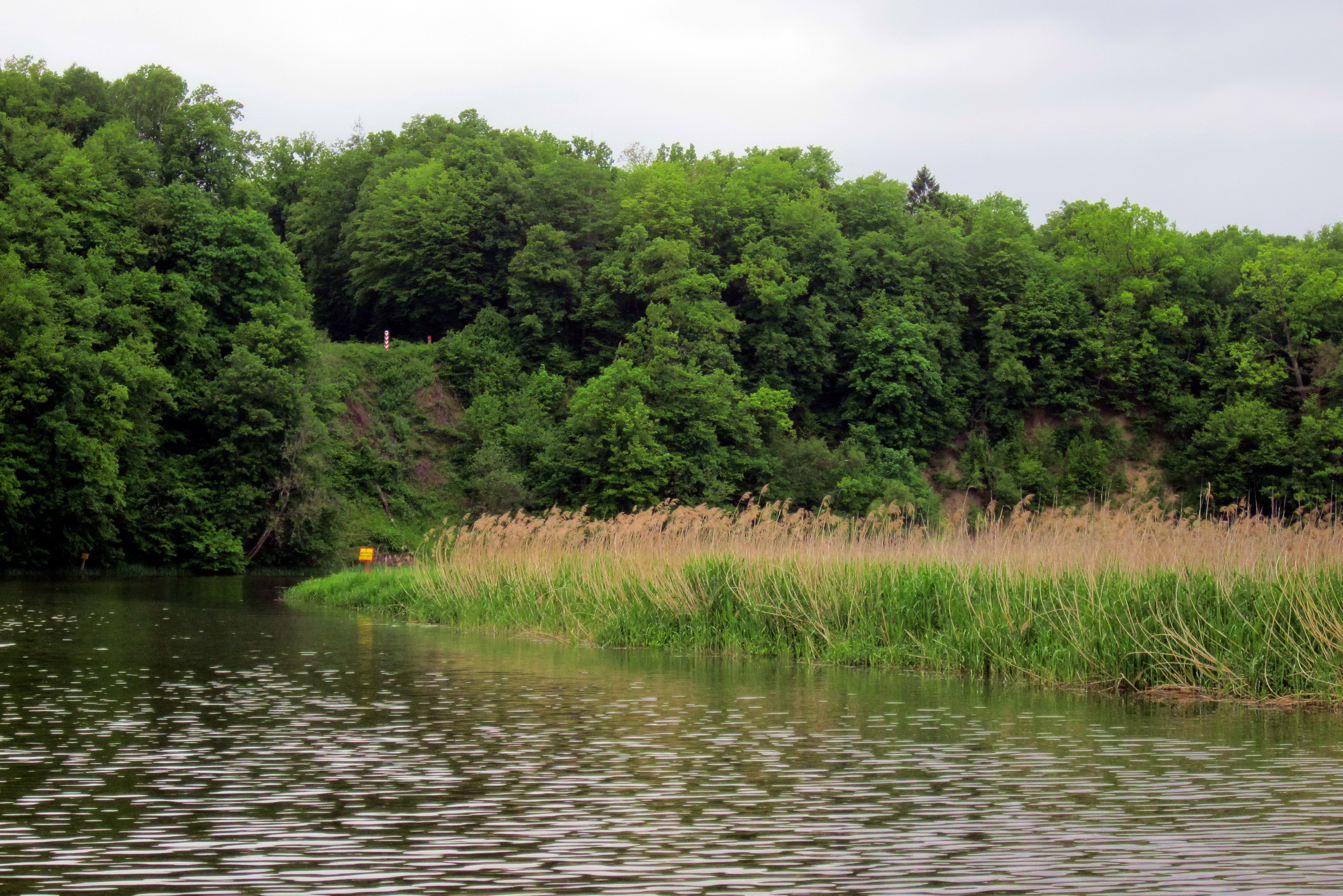
- Łyna River in Stopki

- Location within Poland
- Coordinates: 54°20′N 21°2′E
- Country: Poland
- Voivodeship: Warmian-Masurian
- County: Bartoszyce
- Gmina: Sępopol

Stopki [ˈstɔpki] is a village in the administrative district of Gmina Sępopol, within Bartoszyce County, Warmian-Masurian Voivodeship, in northern Poland, close to the border with the Kaliningrad Oblast of Russia.

== See also ==
- Radzików-Stopki, Masovian Voivodeship (east-central Poland)
