= Ostoje, Masovian Voivodeship =

Ostoje
- Village
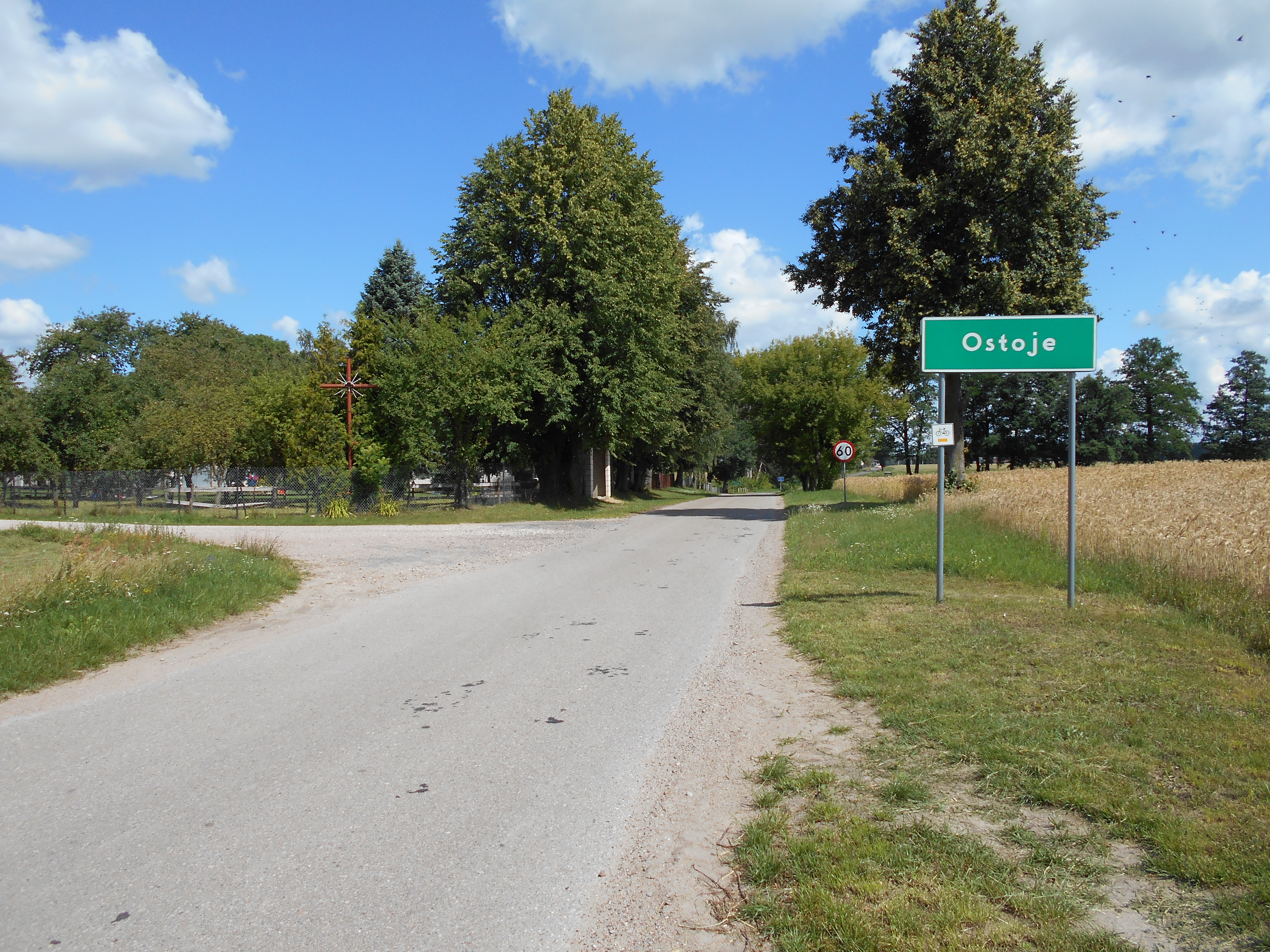

- Location within Poland
- Coordinates: 52°08′00″N 22°35′38″E
- Country: Poland
- Voivodeship: Masovian
- County: Siedlce
- Gmina: Mordy

Ostoje [ɔsˈtɔjɛ] is a village in the administrative district of Gmina Mordy, within Siedlce County, Masovian Voivodeship, in east-central Poland.
