= Radzików =

Radzików may refer to the following places in Poland:

- Radzików, Lower Silesian Voivodeship (south-west Poland)
- Radzików, Masovian Voivodeship (east-central Poland)
- Radzików, Lubusz Voivodeship (west Poland)

== See also ==
- Radzików-Kornica, Masovian Voivodeship (east-central Poland)
- Radzików-Oczki, Masovian Voivodeship (east-central Poland)
- Radzików-Stopki, Masovian Voivodeship (east-central Poland)
- Radzików Wielki, Masovian Voivodeship (east-central Poland)
- Radzików-Wieś, Masovian Voivodeship (east-central Poland)
