= Ignaców, Piotrków County =

Ignaców
- Village
- Location within Poland
- Coordinates: 51°18′59″N 19°40′1″E
- Country: Poland
- Voivodeship: Łódź
- County: Piotrków
- Gmina: Rozprza

Ignaców [iɡˈnat͡suf] is a village in the administrative district of Gmina Rozprza, within Piotrków County, Łódź Voivodeship, in central Poland.
