= Klimonty, Siedlce County =

Klimonty
- Village
- Location within Poland
- Coordinates: 52°10′48″N 22°31′39″E
- Country: Poland
- Voivodeship: Masovian
- County: Siedlce
- Gmina: Mordy

Klimonty [kliˈmɔntɨ] is a village in the administrative district of Gmina Mordy, within Siedlce County, Masovian Voivodeship, in east-central Poland.
