= Świerczyńsko =

Village in Łódź Voivodeship, Poland

- Village
- Location within Poland
- Coordinates: 51°18′N 19°35′E
- Country: Poland
- Voivodeship: Łódź
- County: Piotrków
- Gmina: Rozprza

Świerczyńsko (Polish pronunciation: [ɕfjɛrˈt͡ʂɨj̃skɔ]) is a village in the administrative district of Gmina Rozprza, within Piotrków County, Łódź Voivodeship, in central Poland.
