= Olędy, Gmina Mordy =

Olędy
- Village
- Location within Poland
- Coordinates: 52°15′26″N 22°28′53″E
- Country: Poland
- Voivodeship: Masovian
- County: Siedlce
- Gmina: Mordy
- Time zone: UTC+1 (CET)
  - Summer (DST): UTC+2 (CEST)

Olędy [ɔˈlɛndɨ] is a village in the administrative district of Gmina Mordy, within Siedlce County, Masovian Voivodeship, in east-central Poland.

As of 2011, the population was 75.

== History ==
Five Polish citizens were murdered by Nazi Germany in the village during World War II.

In 1975-1998 the village belonged to the Siedlce Voivodeship.
