= Piotr Kałwa =

Polish Catholic bishop (1893–1974)

The Most Reverend Piotr Kałwa
- Bishop of Lublin
- Church: Catholic Church
- Diocese: Diocese of Lublin
- Appointed: 11 May 1949
- Term ended: 17 July 1974
- Predecessor: Stefan Wyszyński
- Successor: Bolesław Pylak

Orders
- Ordination: 1 June 1916
- Consecration: 29 June 1949 by Stefan Wyszyński

Personal details
- Born: 18 October 1893 Cudzynowice, Austro-Hungarian Empire
- Died: 17 July 1974 (aged 80) Kuźnica, Jastarnia, Poland

Piotr Kałwa (18 October 1893 – 17 July 1974) was a Polish Catholic prelate who served as Bishop of Lublin from 1949 until his death in 1974. He was also a professor of canon law at the John Paul II Catholic University of Lublin.

== Early life and education ==
Kałwa was born on 18 October 1893 in Cudzynowice, present-day Poland. He studied for the priesthood at the diocesan seminary and was ordained a priest on 1 June 1916. After his ordination he served as a vicar and prefect in several parishes, including Skalbmierz, Małogoszcz and Prandocin. In 1918 he began studies in law at the John Paul II Catholic University of Lublin, where he also studied canon law.

Kałwa obtained a doctorate in law from the Jan Kazimierz University in Lwów in 1926 and later completed his habilitation there.

== Military chaplaincy ==
During the years 1921–1939, Kałwa served as a chaplain in the Polish Army. He combined military service with academic work and parish duties during this period.

== Academic career ==
Kałwa taught canon law at the John Paul II Catholic University of Lublin and held various academic positions there. He was recognized for his contributions to ecclesiastical law and church administration.

== Episcopacy ==
On 11 May 1949 Kałwa was appointed Bishop of Lublin and consecrated on 29 June 1949 by Stefan Wyszyński and participated in all the sessions of the Second Vatican Council. He served as bishop until his death in 1974, overseeing the diocese through the difficult postwar and communist period in Poland.

== Death ==
Kałwa died on 17 July 1974 in Kuźnica, Poland, while still in office. He was buried in Lublin.
