= Straszów, Łódź Voivodeship =

Straszów
- Village
- Location within Poland
- Coordinates: 51°18′N 19°42′E
- Country: Poland
- Voivodeship: Łódź
- County: Piotrków
- Gmina: Rozprza

Straszów [ˈstraʂuf] is a village in the administrative district of Gmina Rozprza, within Piotrków County, Łódź Voivodeship, in central Poland.

The population of the village is 305. In 1975-1998 the village was located in the Kielce Province. Straszów is located in the Konecko-Łopuszniański Area of Protected Landscape.
