= Nowa Wieś, Gmina Rozprza =

Nowa Wieś
- Village
- Location within Poland
- Coordinates: 51°16′49″N 19°38′12″E
- Country: Poland
- Voivodeship: Łódź
- County: Piotrków
- Gmina: Rozprza

Nowa Wieś [ˈnɔva ˈvjɛɕ] is a village in the administrative district of Gmina Rozprza, within Piotrków County, Łódź Voivodeship, in central Poland.
