= Białocin, Łódź Voivodeship =

Białocin
- Village
- Location within Poland
- Coordinates: 51°17′N 19°37′E
- Country: Poland
- Voivodeship: Łódź
- County: Piotrków
- Gmina: Rozprza

Białocin [bjaˈwɔt͡ɕin] is a village in the administrative district of Gmina Rozprza, within Piotrków County, Łódź Voivodeship, in central Poland.
