= Cieślin, Łódź Voivodeship =

Cieślin
- Village
- Location within Poland
- Coordinates: 51°15′33″N 19°35′33″E
- Country: Poland
- Voivodeship: Łódź
- County: Piotrków
- Gmina: Rozprza
- Population: 170

Cieślin [ˈt͡ɕɛɕlin] is a village in the administrative district of Gmina Rozprza, within Piotrków County, Łódź Voivodeship, in central Poland.
