= Romanówka, Łódź Voivodeship =

Romanówka
- Village
- Location within Poland
- Coordinates: 51°19′34″N 19°39′12″E
- Country: Poland
- Voivodeship: Łódź
- County: Piotrków
- Gmina: Rozprza

Romanówka [rɔmaˈnufka] is a village in the administrative district of Gmina Rozprza, within Piotrków County, Łódź Voivodeship, in central Poland.
