= Bolesław Pylak =

Polish Roman Catholic bishop (1921–2019)

His Excellecy Bolesław Pylak
- Archbishop of Lublin
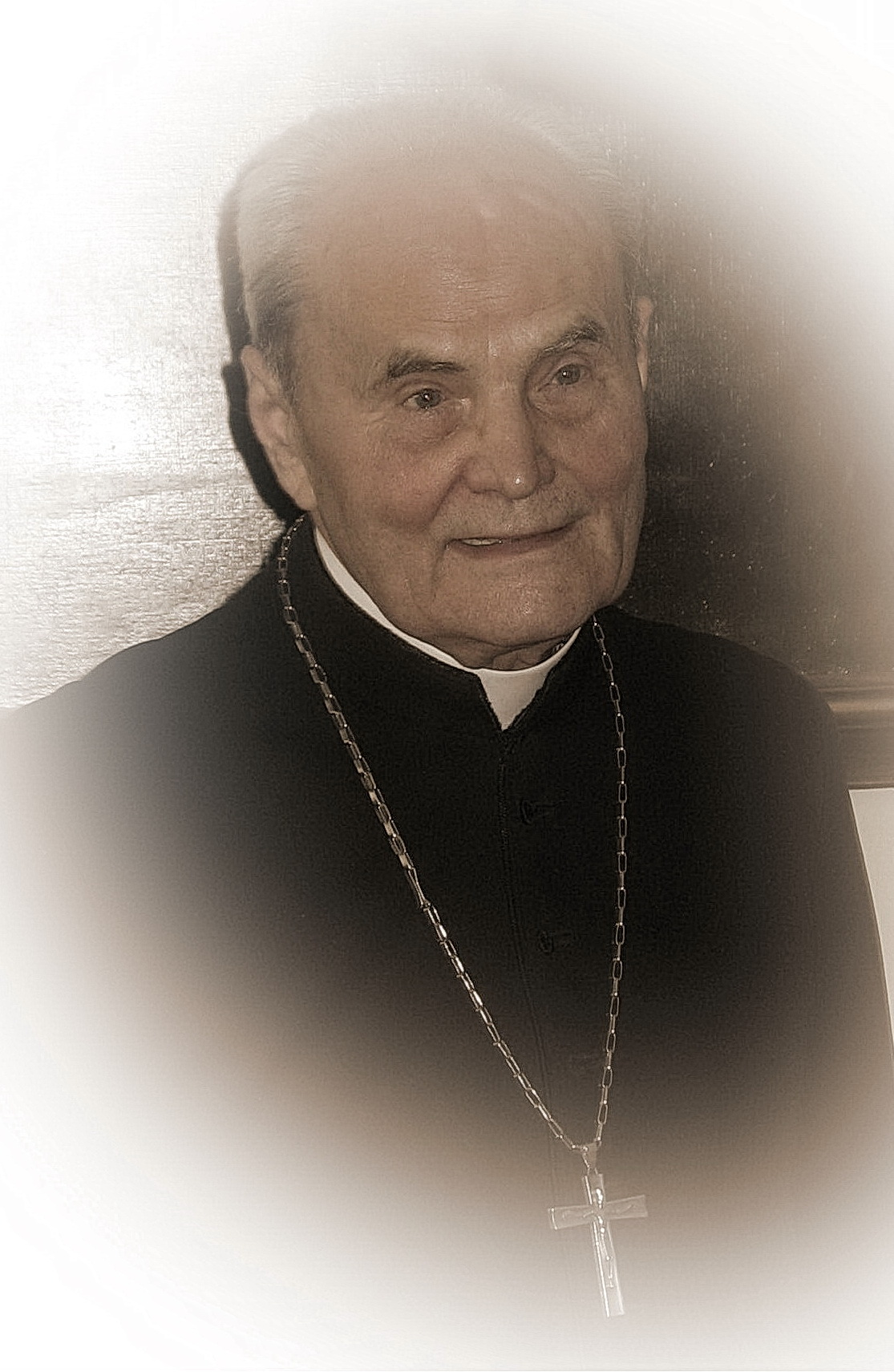
- Archbishop Pylak
- Church: Roman Catholic Church
- See: Archdiocese of Lublin
- In office: 1975–1997
- Predecessor: Piotr Kałwa
- Successor: Józef Mirosław Życiński

Orders
- Ordination: 29 June 1948 by Stefan Wyszyński
- Consecration: 29 May 1966 by Piotr Kałwa

Personal details
- Born: 20 August 1921 Łopiennik Górny, Second Polish Republic
- Died: 6 June 2019 (aged 97) Lublin, Poland

Bolesław Pylak (20 August 1921 – 6 June 2019) was a Polish prelate of the Roman Catholic Church. He was one of the oldest Roman Catholic bishops in Poland. Pylak was born in Łopiennik Górny, Poland and was ordained a priest on 29 June 1948 from Archdiocese of Lublin. Pylak was appointed Auxiliary bishop of the Lublin diocese as well as Titular bishop of Midica on 14 March 1966, and ordained a bishop on 29 May 1966. Pylak was appointed bishop of the Diocese of Lublin on 27 June 1975 and served in that capacity (becoming Archbishop in 1992 when Lublin became an Archdiocese) until his retirement on 14 June 1997.

== See also ==
- Archdiocese of Lublin
