= Pieńki, Gmina Mordy =

Pieńki
- Village
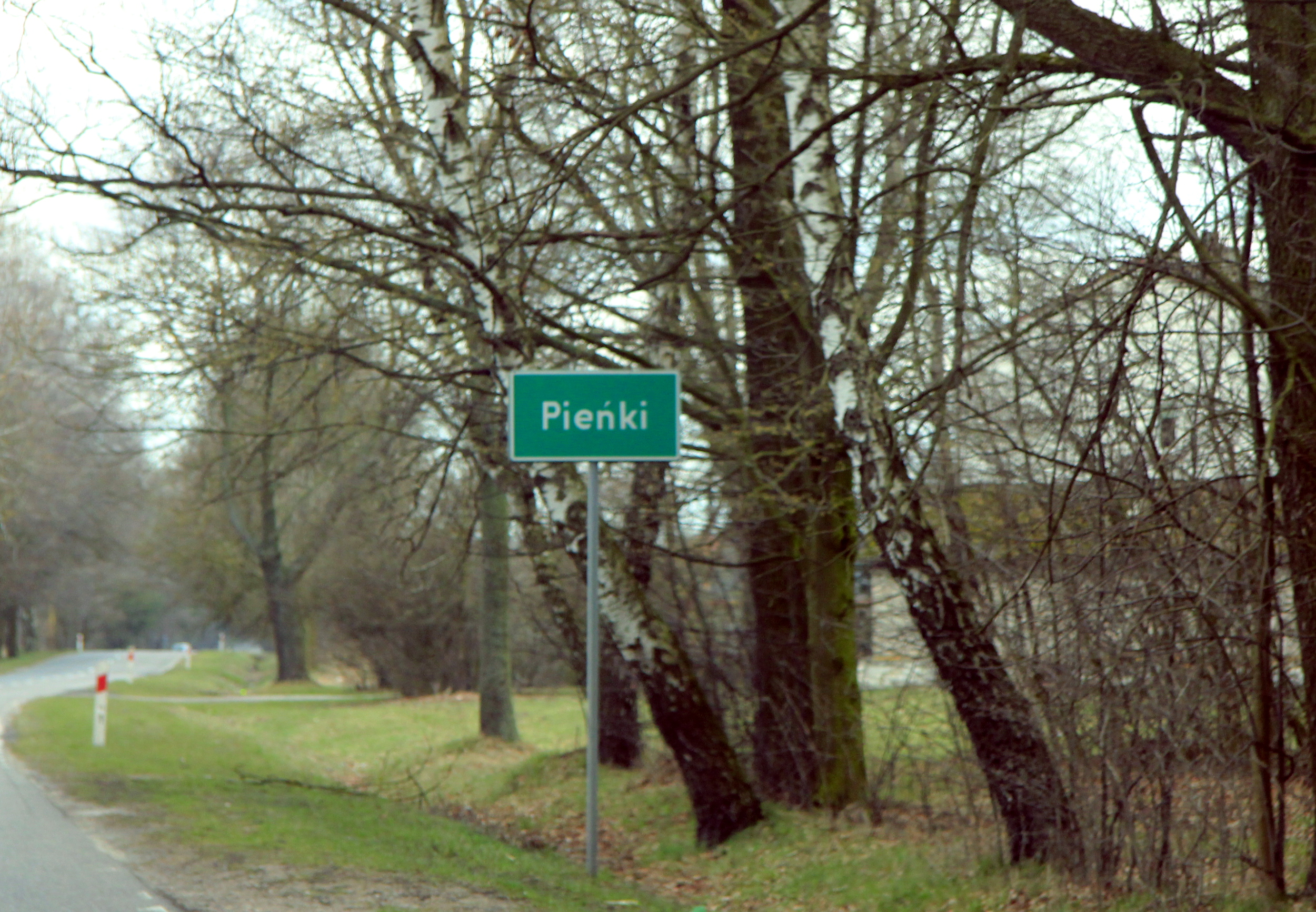

- Location within Poland
- Coordinates: 52°11′35″N 22°27′37″E
- Country: Poland
- Voivodeship: Masovian
- County: Siedlce
- Gmina: Mordy

Pieńki [ˈpjɛɲki] is a village in the administrative district of Gmina Mordy, within Siedlce County, Masovian Voivodeship, in east-central Poland.
