= Stefanówka, Łódź Voivodeship =

Stefanówka
- Village
- Location within Poland
- Coordinates: 51°19′6″N 19°38′47″E
- Country: Poland
- Voivodeship: Łódź
- County: Piotrków
- Gmina: Rozprza

Stefanówka [stɛfaˈnufka] is a village in the administrative district of Gmina Rozprza, within Piotrków County, Łódź Voivodeship, in central Poland.
