= Archdiocese of Lublin =

Roman Catholic archdiocese in Poland

Coordinates: 51°14′N 22°34′E

Archdiocese of Lublin Archidioecesis Lublinensis Archidiecezja Lubelska

Catholic
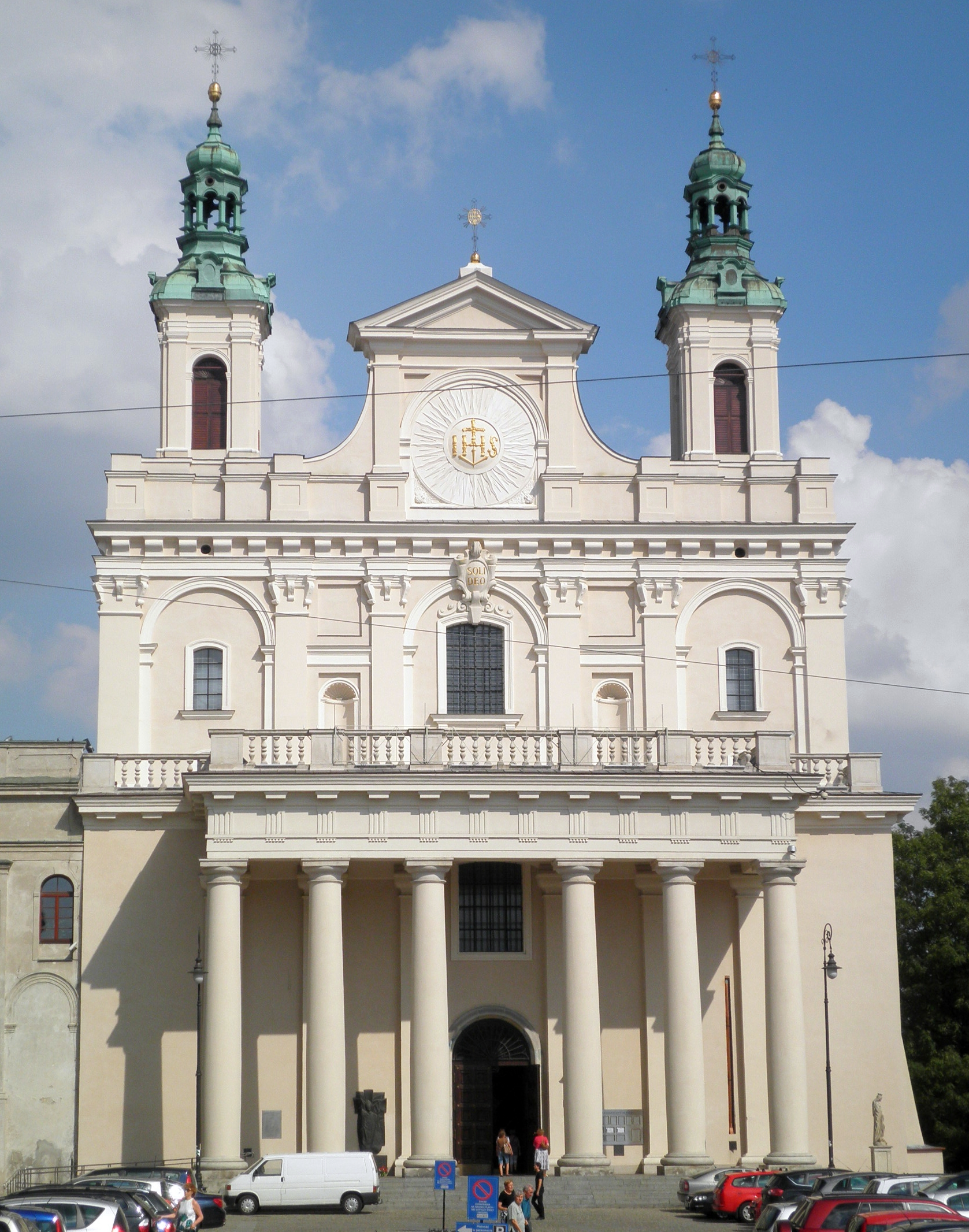
- St. John the Baptist Cathedral, Lublin

Location
- Country: Poland

Statistics
- Area: 9,108 km^{2} (3,517 sq mi)
- Population: Total; Catholics: (as of 2019); 1,079,144; 1,027,421 (95.2%)

Information
- Denomination: Catholic Church
- Rite: Latin Rite
- Established: 22 September 1805 (As Diocese of Lublin); 25 March 1992 (As Archdiocese of Lublin)
- Cathedral: Archikatedra św. Jana Chrzciciela; Cathedral of St. John the Baptist, Lublin

Current leadership
- Pope: Leo XIV
- Metropolitan Archbishop: Stanisław Budzik
- Auxiliary Bishops: Artur Grzegorz Miziński; Józef Wróbel, SCJ; Adam Piotr Bab
- Bishops emeritus: Mieczysław Cisło

Map

Website
- Website of the Archdiocese

The Archdiocese of Lublin (Latin: Archidioecesis Lublinensis) is a Latin archdiocese of the Catholic Church located in the city of Lublin in Poland.

== History ==
- 1375: Established as Diocese of Chełm
- 1790: Renamed as Diocese of Chełm and Lublin
- September 22, 1805: Renamed as Diocese of Lublin
- March 25, 1992: Promoted as Metropolitan Archdiocese of Lublin

== Special churches ==
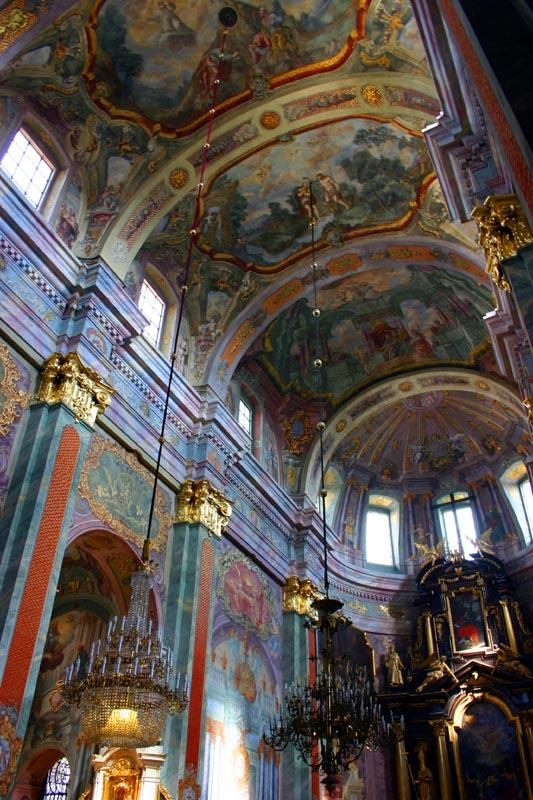
Interior of Archcathedral of St. John the Baptist in Lublin

- Minor Basilicas
  - Bazylika pw. Narodzenia NMP, Chełm
  - Bazylika pw. św. Stanisława BM (OO. Dominikanie), Lublin
  - Bazylika św. Wojciecha (Sanktuarium Matki Bożej Kębelskiej), Wąwolnica

== Leadership ==
- Bishops of Chełm (Roman rite)
  - Bishop Jakub Uchański (18 November 1551 – 1561), appointed Bishop of Włocławek (Kujawy, Kalisze); future Archbishop
  - Bishop Stanislaw Pstrokonski (1645–1657)
  - Bishop Stanisław Dąmbski (1673–1676)
  - Bishop Stanisław Jacek Święcicki (8 February 1677 – 1696)
  - Bishop Mikołaj Michał Wyżycki (1699–1705)
  - Bishop Kazimierz Łubieński (1705 – 10 May 1710)
  - Bishop Teodor Wolff von Ludinghausen (10 November 1710 – 9 May 1712)
  - Bishop Krzysztof Andrzej Jan Szembek (30 July 1711 – 15 March 1719)
  - Bishop Alexander Antoni Pleszowice Fredro (1719–1724)
  - Bishop Jan Feliks Szaniawski (29 January 1725 – 1733)
  - Bishop Walenty Franciszek Wężyk (1753–1765)
  - Bishop Feliks Paweł Turski (22 April 1765 – 4 March 1771)
  - Bishop Jan Alojzy Aleksandrowicz (1780 – 12 September 1781)
- Bishops of Chełm and Lublin (Roman rite)
  - Bishop Maciej Grzegorz Garnysz (1781 – 6 October 1790)
  - Bishop Wojciech Skarszewski (1790 – 22 September 1805 see below)
- Bishops of Lublin (Roman rite)
  - Bishop Wojciech Skarszewski (see above 22 September 1805 – 1824), appointed Archbishop of Warszawa {Warsaw}
  - Bishop Walenty Baranowski (22 December 1871 – 1879)
  - Bishop Kazimierz Józef Wnorowski (15 March 1883 – 1885)
  - Bishop Francesco Jaczewski (30 December 1889 – 1918)
  - Bishop Marian Leon Fulman (24 September 1918 – 18 December 1945)
  - Bishop Stefan Wyszyński (4 March 1946 – 12 November 1948), appointed Archbishop of Gniezno and Warszawa {Warsaw} (Cardinal in 1953)
  - Bishop Piotr Kałwa (30 May 1949 – 17 July 1974)
  - Bishop Bolesław Pylak (27 June 1975 – 25 March 1992 see below)
- Archbishops of Lublin (Roman rite)
  - Archbishop Bolesław Pylak (see above 25 March 1992 – 14 June 1997)
  - Archbishop Józef Mirosław Życiński (14 June 1997 – 10 February 2011)
  - Archbishop Stanisław Budzik (26 September 2011 – )

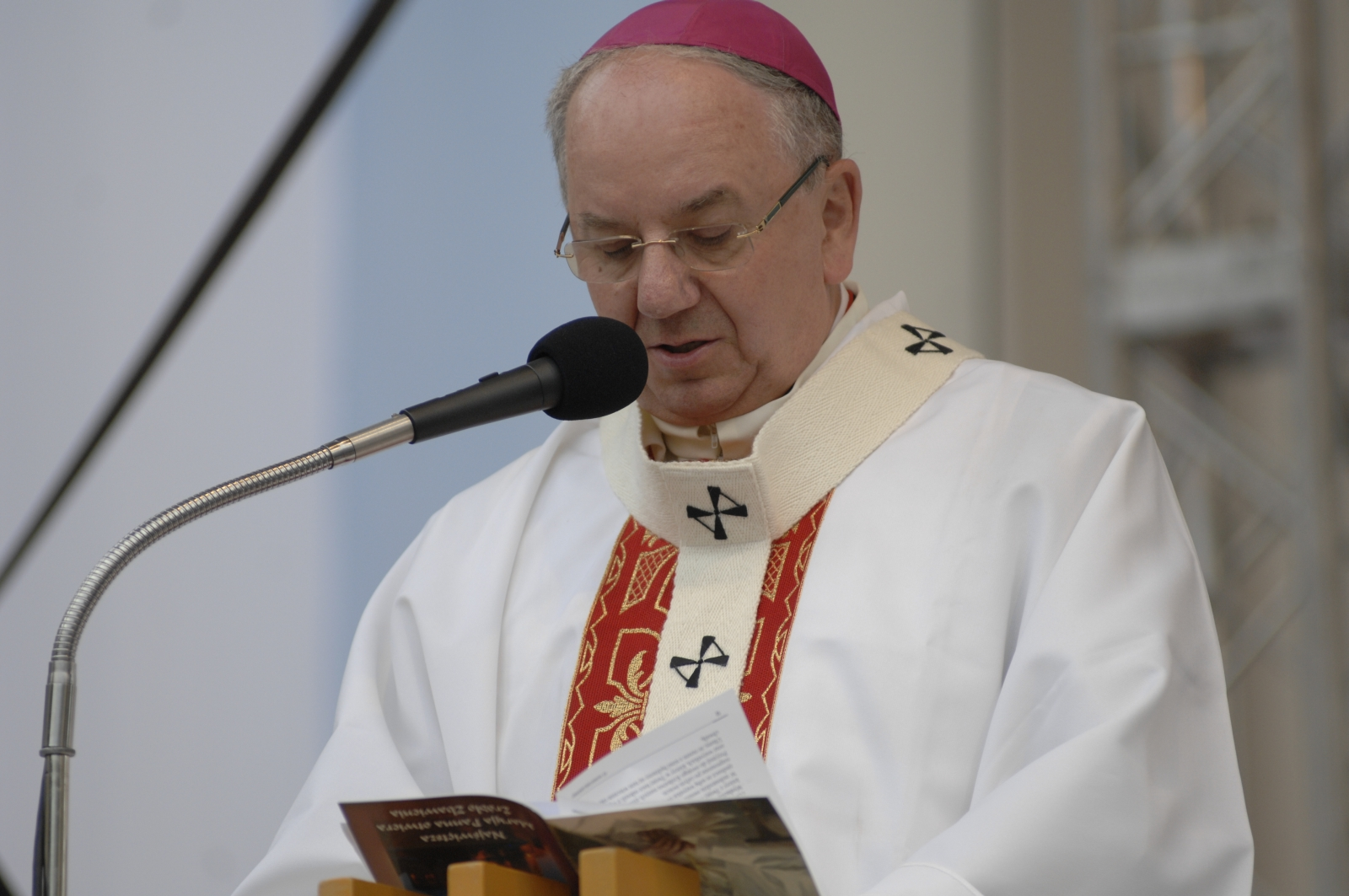
Archbishop Stanisław Budzik

== Suffragan dioceses ==
- Sandomierz
- Siedlce

== See also ==
- Roman Catholicism in Poland
- John Paul II Catholic University of Lublin

== Sources ==
- GCatholic.org
- Catholic Hierarchy
- Diocese website
