= Olszyc =

Olszyc can refer to following locations in Poland:

- Olszyc-Folwark
- Olszyc Szlachecki
- Olszyc Włościański
