= Tchórzew-Plewki =

- Village
- Location within Poland
- Coordinates: 52°4′35″N 22°30′26″E
- Country: Poland
- Voivodeship: Masovian
- County: Siedlce
- Gmina: Zbuczyn

Tchórzew-Plewki [ˈtxuʐɛf ˈplɛfki] is a village in the administrative district of Gmina Zbuczyn, within Siedlce County, Masovian Voivodeship, in east-central Poland.
