= Grochówka, Masovian Voivodeship =

Grochówka
- Village
- Location within Poland
- Coordinates: 52°2′53″N 22°38′55″E
- Country: Poland
- Voivodeship: Masovian
- County: Siedlce
- Gmina: Zbuczyn
- Elevation: 155 m (509 ft)

Grochówka [ɡrɔˈxufka] is a village in the administrative district of Gmina Zbuczyn, within Siedlce County, Masovian Voivodeship, in east-central Poland.
