= Brzozów, Siedlce County =

Brzozów
- Village
- Location within Poland
- Coordinates: 52°16′1″N 22°19′0″E
- Country: Poland
- Voivodeship: Masovian
- County: Siedlce
- Gmina: Suchożebry

Brzozów [ˈbʐɔzuf] is a village in the administrative district of Gmina Suchożebry, within Siedlce County, Masovian Voivodeship, in east-central Poland.
