= Krzesk-Majątek =

Village in Gmina Zbuczyn, Poland

- Village
- Location within Poland
- Coordinates: 52°04′21″N 22°36′14″E
- Country: Poland
- Voivodeship: Masovian
- County: Siedlce
- Gmina: Zbuczyn

Population
  - Total: 200
- Time zone: UTC+1 (CET)
  - Summer (DST): UTC+2 (CEST)
- Postal code: 08-111
- Vehicle registration: WSI

Krzesk-Majątek [ˈkʂɛsk maˈjɔntɛk] is a village in the administrative district of Gmina Zbuczyn, within Siedlce County, Masovian Voivodeship, in eastern Poland.

The Chopin vodka is produced at Gorzelnia Chopin (Chopin Distillery), established in 1896, in Krzesk-Majątek. The distillery is open to tourists upon prior reservation.
