= Krześlinek =

- Village
- Location within Poland
- Coordinates: 52°14′28″N 22°21′9″E
- Country: Poland
- Voivodeship: Masovian
- County: Siedlce
- Gmina: Suchożebry

Krześlinek [kʂɛˈɕlinɛk] is a village in the administrative district of Gmina Suchożebry, within Siedlce County, Masovian Voivodeship, in east-central Poland.
