= Przygody =

- Village
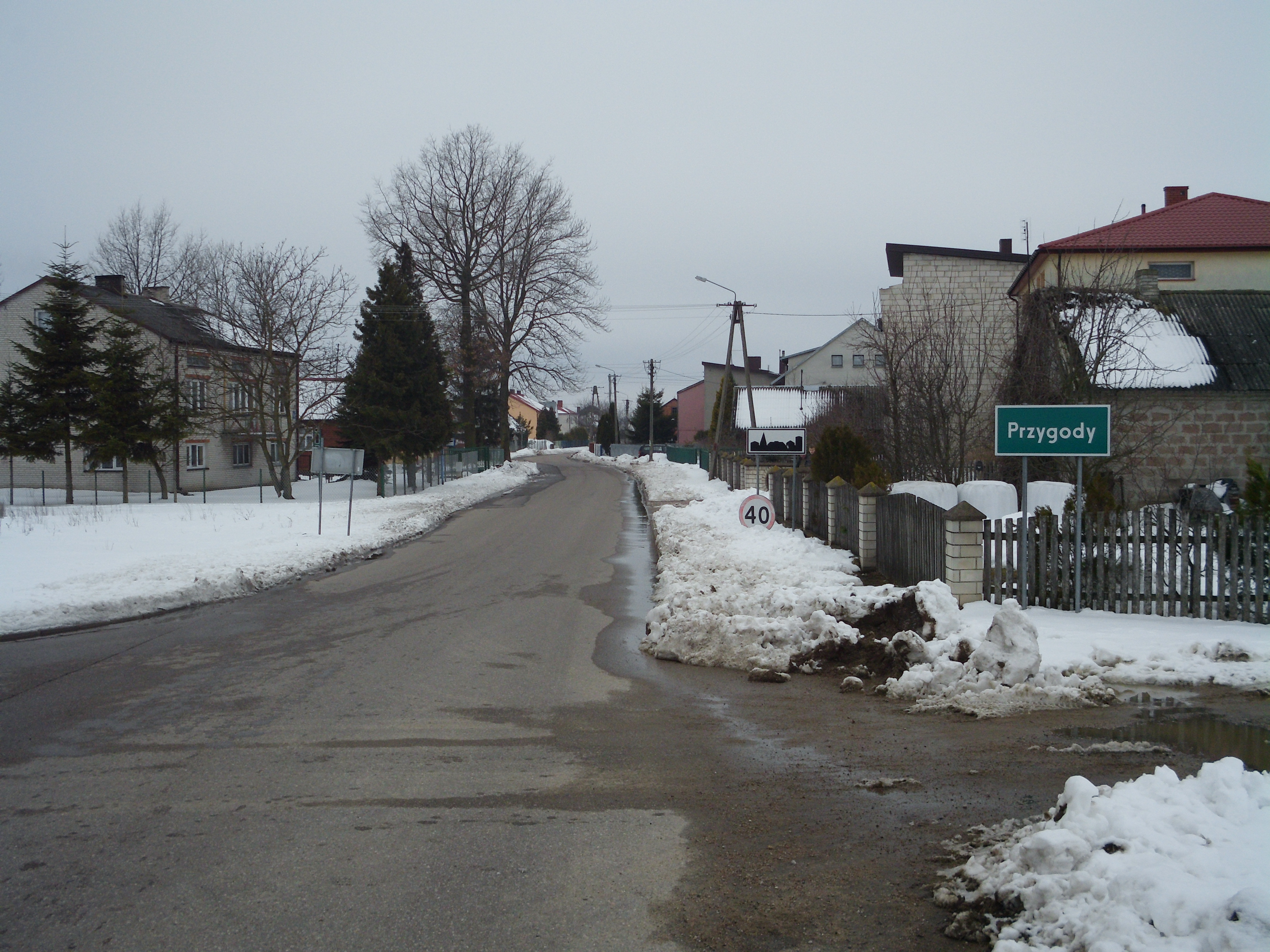
- Main road in Przygody

- Location within Poland
- Coordinates: 52°15′N 22°16′E
- Country: Poland
- Voivodeship: Masovian
- County: Siedlce
- Gmina: Suchożebry

Przygody [pʂɨˈɡɔdɨ] is a village in the administrative district of Gmina Suchożebry, within Siedlce County, Masovian Voivodeship, in east-central Poland.
