= Podnieśno =

- Village
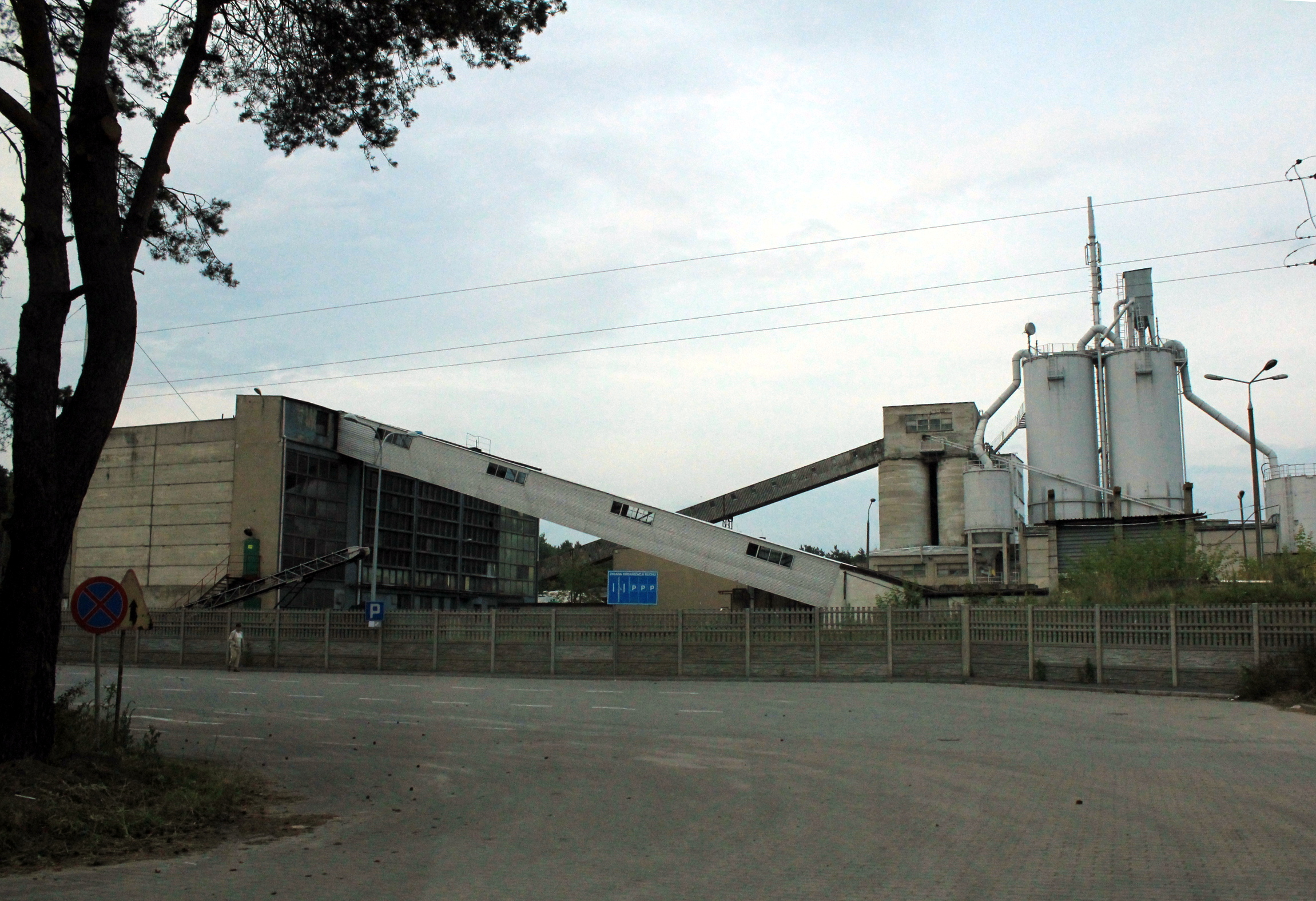
- Solbet concrete plant

- Location within Poland
- Coordinates: 52°18′N 22°14′E
- Country: Poland
- Voivodeship: Masovian
- County: Siedlce
- Gmina: Suchożebry

Podnieśno [pɔdˈɲɛɕnɔ] is a village in the administrative district of Gmina Suchożebry, within Siedlce County, Masovian Voivodeship, in east-central Poland.
