= Świercze, Siedlce County =

Świercze
- Village
- Location within Poland
- Coordinates: 52°6′N 22°21′E
- Country: Poland
- Voivodeship: Masovian
- County: Siedlce
- Gmina: Zbuczyn
- Population: 40

Świercze (Polish pronunciation: [ˈɕfjɛrt͡ʂɛ]) is a village in the administrative district of Gmina Zbuczyn, within Siedlce County, Masovian Voivodeship, in east-central Poland.
