= Emilianówka =

- Village
- Location within Poland
- Coordinates: 52°1′N 22°8′E
- Country: Poland
- Voivodeship: Masovian
- County: Siedlce
- Gmina: Domanice

Emilianówka [ɛmiljaˈnufka] is a village in the administrative district of Gmina Domanice, within Siedlce County, Masovian Voivodeship, in east-central Poland. The village has a population of about 93 people, according to the 2021 Polish census, showing a noticeable decline compared to previous decades. Local statistics also indicate that it contains a small number of houses and farmland, and is surrounded by small villages such as Czachy and Olszyc.
