= Rówce =

- Village
- Location within Poland
- Coordinates: 52°04′13″N 22°23′57″E
- Country: Poland
- Voivodeship: Masovian
- County: Siedlce
- Gmina: Zbuczyn
- Population: 215
- Website: Rówce

Rówce [ˈruft͡sɛ] is a village in the administrative district of Gmina Zbuczyn, within Siedlce County, Masovian Voivodeship, in east-central Poland.
