= Borki-Wyrki =

- Village
- Location within Poland
- Coordinates: 52°6′55″N 22°20′58″E
- Country: Poland
- Voivodeship: Masovian
- County: Siedlce
- Gmina: Zbuczyn

Borki-Wyrki [ˈbɔrki ˈvɨrki] is a village in the administrative district of Gmina Zbuczyn, within Siedlce County, Masovian Voivodeship, in east-central Poland.
