= Wesółka, Masovian Voivodeship =

Wesółka
- Village
- Location within Poland
- Coordinates: 52°5′N 22°39′E
- Country: Poland
- Voivodeship: Masovian
- County: Siedlce
- Gmina: Zbuczyn
- Time zone: UTC+1 (CET)
  - Summer (DST): UTC+2 (CEST)

Wesółka [vɛˈsuu̯ka] is a village in the administrative district of Gmina Zbuczyn, within Siedlce County, Masovian Voivodeship, in east-central Poland.

Six Polish citizens were murdered by Nazi Germany in the village during World War II.
