= Sobicze =

- Village
- Location within Poland
- Coordinates: 52°6′N 22°38′E
- Country: Poland
- Voivodeship: Masovian
- County: Siedlce
- Gmina: Zbuczyn

Sobicze [sɔˈbit͡ʂɛ] is a village in the administrative district of Gmina Zbuczyn, within Siedlce County, Masovian Voivodeship, in east-central Poland.
