= Maciejowice, Siedlce County =

Maciejowice
- Village
- Location within Poland
- Coordinates: 52°2′46″N 22°34′34″E
- Country: Poland
- Voivodeship: Masovian
- County: Siedlce
- Gmina: Zbuczyn

Maciejowice [mat͡ɕɛjɔˈvit͡sɛ] is a village in the administrative district of Gmina Zbuczyn, within Siedlce County, Masovian Voivodeship, in east-central Poland.
