= Tchórzew, Masovian Voivodeship =

Tchórzew
- Village
- Location within Poland
- Coordinates: 52°5′39″N 22°30′29″E
- Country: Poland
- Voivodeship: Masovian
- County: Siedlce
- Gmina: Zbuczyn

Tchórzew [ˈtxuʐɛf] is a village in the administrative district of Gmina Zbuczyn, within Siedlce County, Masovian Voivodeship, in east-central Poland.
