= Domanice-Kolonia =

- Village
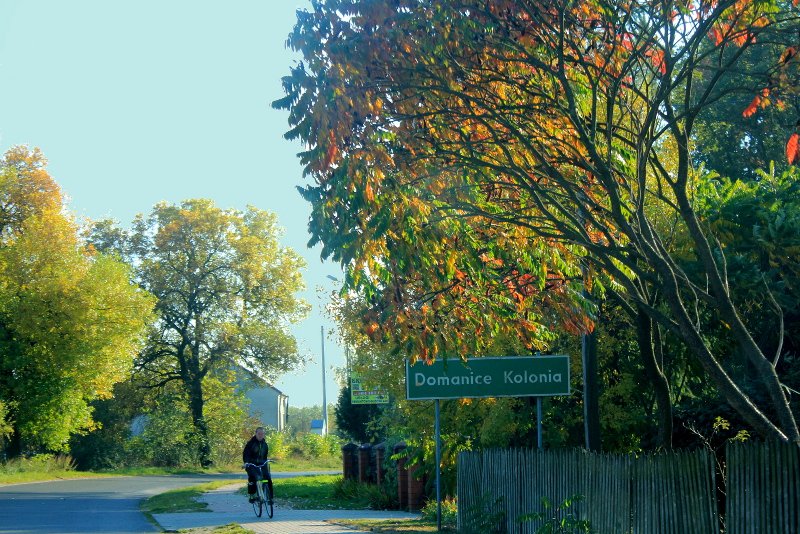

- Location within Poland
- Coordinates: 52°02′56″N 22°11′17″E
- Country: Poland
- Voivodeship: Masovian
- County: Siedlce
- Gmina: Domanice

Domanice-Kolonia [dɔmaˈnit͡sɛ kɔˈlɔɲa] is a village in the administrative district of Gmina Domanice, within Siedlce County, Masovian Voivodeship, in east-central Poland.
