= Izdebki-Kośmidry =

- Village
- Location within Poland
- Coordinates: 52°5′N 22°36′E
- Country: Poland
- Voivodeship: Masovian
- County: Siedlce
- Gmina: Zbuczyn
- Population: 123

Izdebki-Kośmidry [izˈdɛpki kɔɕˈmidrɨ] is a village in the administrative district of Gmina Zbuczyn, within Siedlce County, Masovian Voivodeship, in east-central Poland.
