= Kopcie, Gmina Suchożebry =

Kopcie
- Village
- Location within Poland
- Coordinates: 52°13′55″N 22°15′39″E
- Country: Poland
- Voivodeship: Masovian
- County: Siedlce
- Gmina: Suchożebry

Kopcie [ˈkɔpt͡ɕɛ] is a village in the administrative district of Gmina Suchożebry, within Siedlce County, Masovian Voivodeship, in east-central Poland.
