= Jasionka, Masovian Voivodeship =

Jasionka
- Village
- Location within Poland
- Coordinates: 52°4′N 22°23′E
- Country: Poland
- Voivodeship: Masovian
- County: Siedlce
- Gmina: Zbuczyn
- Population: 280

Jasionka [jaˈɕɔnka] is a village in the administrative district of Gmina Zbuczyn, within Siedlce County, Masovian Voivodeship, in east-central Poland.
