= Grodzisk, Siedlce County =

Grodzisk
- Village
- Location within Poland
- Coordinates: 52°4′N 22°25′E
- Country: Poland
- Voivodeship: Masovian
- County: Siedlce
- Gmina: Zbuczyn

Grodzisk [ˈɡrɔd͡ʑisk] is a village in the administrative district of Gmina Zbuczyn, within Siedlce County, Masovian Voivodeship, in east-central Poland.
