= Krynica, Masovian Voivodeship =

Krynica
- Village
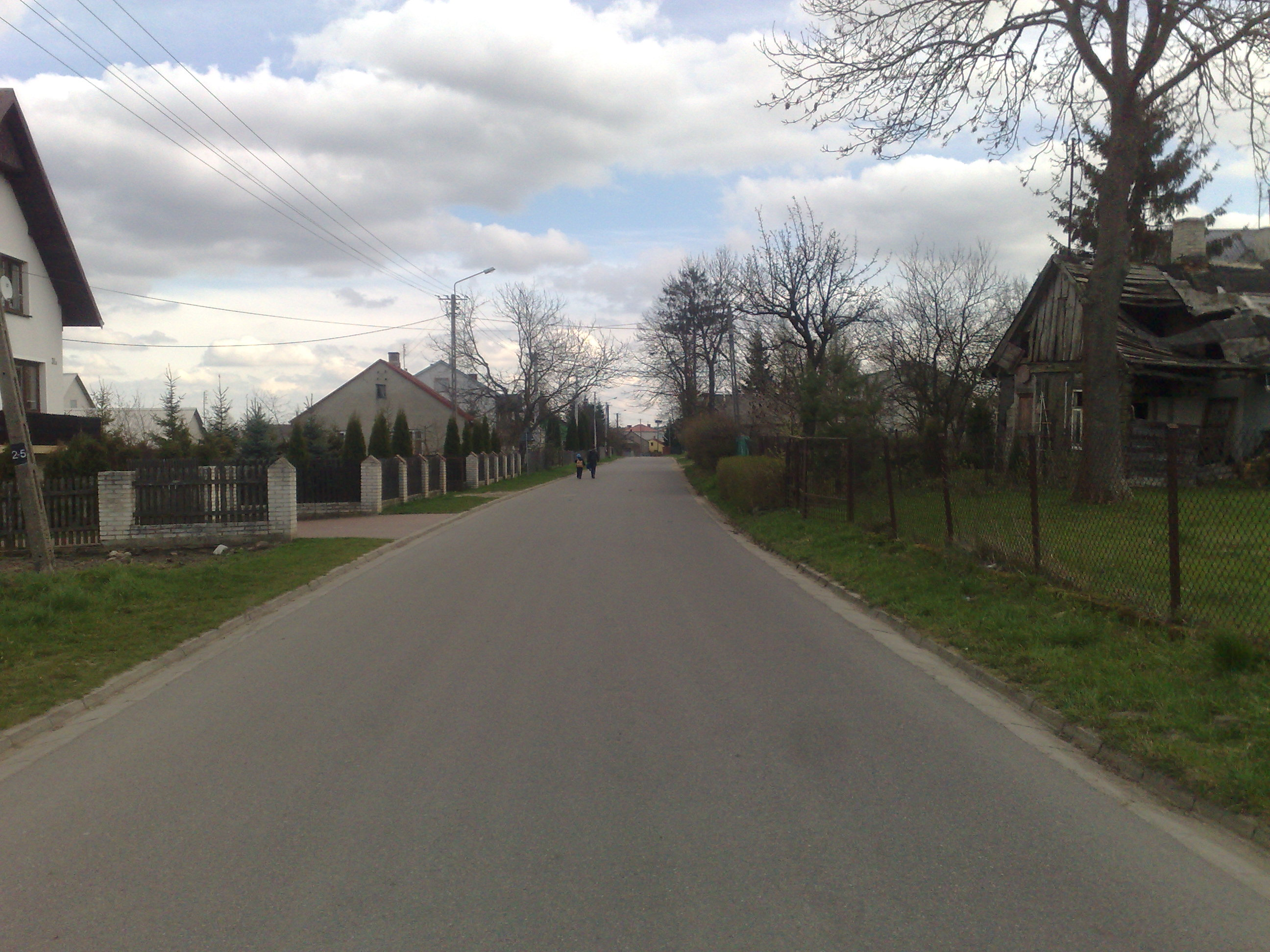
- Road in Krynica

- Location within Poland
- Coordinates: 52°18′N 22°18′E
- Country: Poland
- Voivodeship: Masovian
- County: Siedlce
- Gmina: Suchożebry

Krynica [krɨˈnit͡sa] is a village in the administrative district of Gmina Suchożebry, within Siedlce County, Masovian Voivodeship, in east-central Poland.
