= Izdebki-Wąsy =

- Village
- Location within Poland
- Coordinates: 52°6′3″N 22°34′9″E
- Country: Poland
- Voivodeship: Masovian
- County: Siedlce
- Gmina: Zbuczyn

Izdebki-Wąsy [izˈdɛpki ˈvɔ̃sɨ] is a village in the administrative district of Gmina Zbuczyn, within Siedlce County, Masovian Voivodeship, in east-central Poland.
