= Ługi Wielkie =

- Village
- Location within Poland
- Coordinates: 52°7′N 22°23′E
- Country: Poland
- Voivodeship: Masovian
- County: Siedlce
- Gmina: Zbuczyn

Ługi Wielkie [ˈwuɡi ˈvjɛlkʲɛ] is a village in the administrative district of Gmina Zbuczyn, within Siedlce County, Masovian Voivodeship, in east-central Poland. It has a population of 214.
