= Łęcznowola =

- Village
- Location within Poland
- Coordinates: 52°3′N 22°28′E
- Country: Poland
- Voivodeship: Masovian
- County: Siedlce
- Gmina: Zbuczyn

Łęcznowola [wɛnt͡ʂnɔˈvɔla] is a village in the administrative district of Gmina Zbuczyn, within Siedlce County, Masovian Voivodeship, in east-central Poland.
