= Zażelazna =

- Village
- Location within Poland
- Coordinates: 52°1′N 22°12′E
- Country: Poland
- Voivodeship: Masovian
- County: Siedlce
- Gmina: Domanice

Zażelazna [zaʐɛˈlazna] is a village in the administrative district of Gmina Domanice, within Siedlce County, Masovian Voivodeship, in east-central Poland.
