= Kopcie, Gmina Domanice =

Kopcie
- Village
- Location within Poland
- Coordinates: 52°2′N 22°8′E
- Country: Poland
- Voivodeship: Masovian
- County: Siedlce
- Gmina: Domanice
- Population: 330

Kopcie [ˈkɔpt͡ɕɛ] is a village in the administrative district of Gmina Domanice, within Siedlce County, Masovian Voivodeship, in east-central Poland.
