= Nakory =

- Village
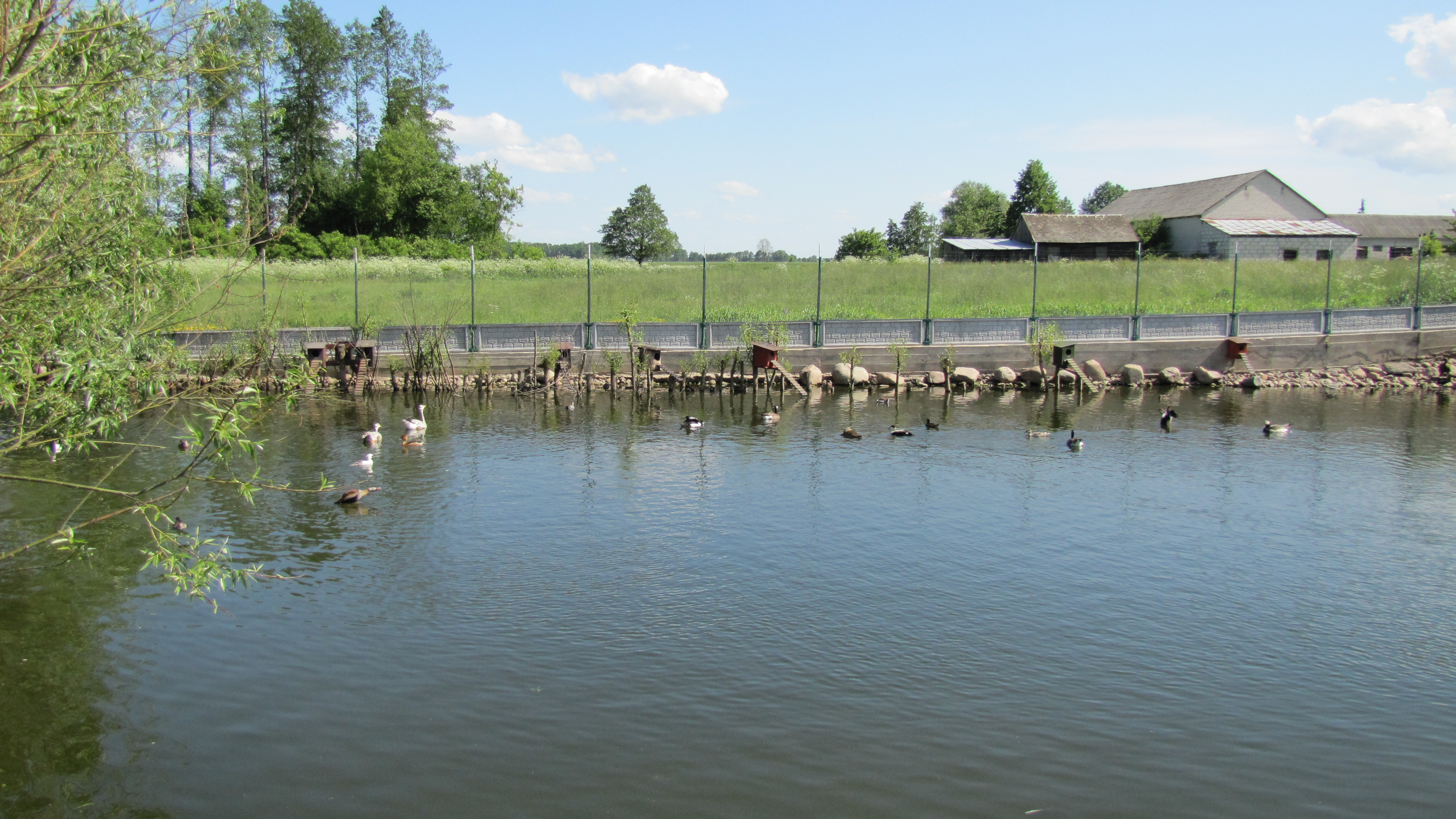

- Location within Poland
- Coordinates: 52°17′N 22°20′E
- Country: Poland
- Voivodeship: Masovian
- County: Siedlce
- Gmina: Suchożebry
- Time zone: UTC+1 (CET)
  - Summer (DST): UTC+2 (CEST)

Nakory [naˈkɔrɨ] is a village in the administrative district of Gmina Suchożebry, within Siedlce County, Masovian Voivodeship, in east-central Poland.

Five Polish citizens were murdered by Nazi Germany in the village during World War II.
