= Śmiary =

- Village
- Location within Poland
- Coordinates: 52°2′20″N 22°15′2″E
- Country: Poland
- Voivodeship: Masovian
- County: Siedlce
- Gmina: Wiśniew
- Population: 208

Śmiary [ˈɕmjarɨ] is a village in the administrative district of Gmina Wiśniew, within Siedlce County, Masovian Voivodeship, in east-central Poland. The village has a church, cemetery and primary school.

== See also ==
- Śmiary-Kolonia
