= Krześlin =

- Village
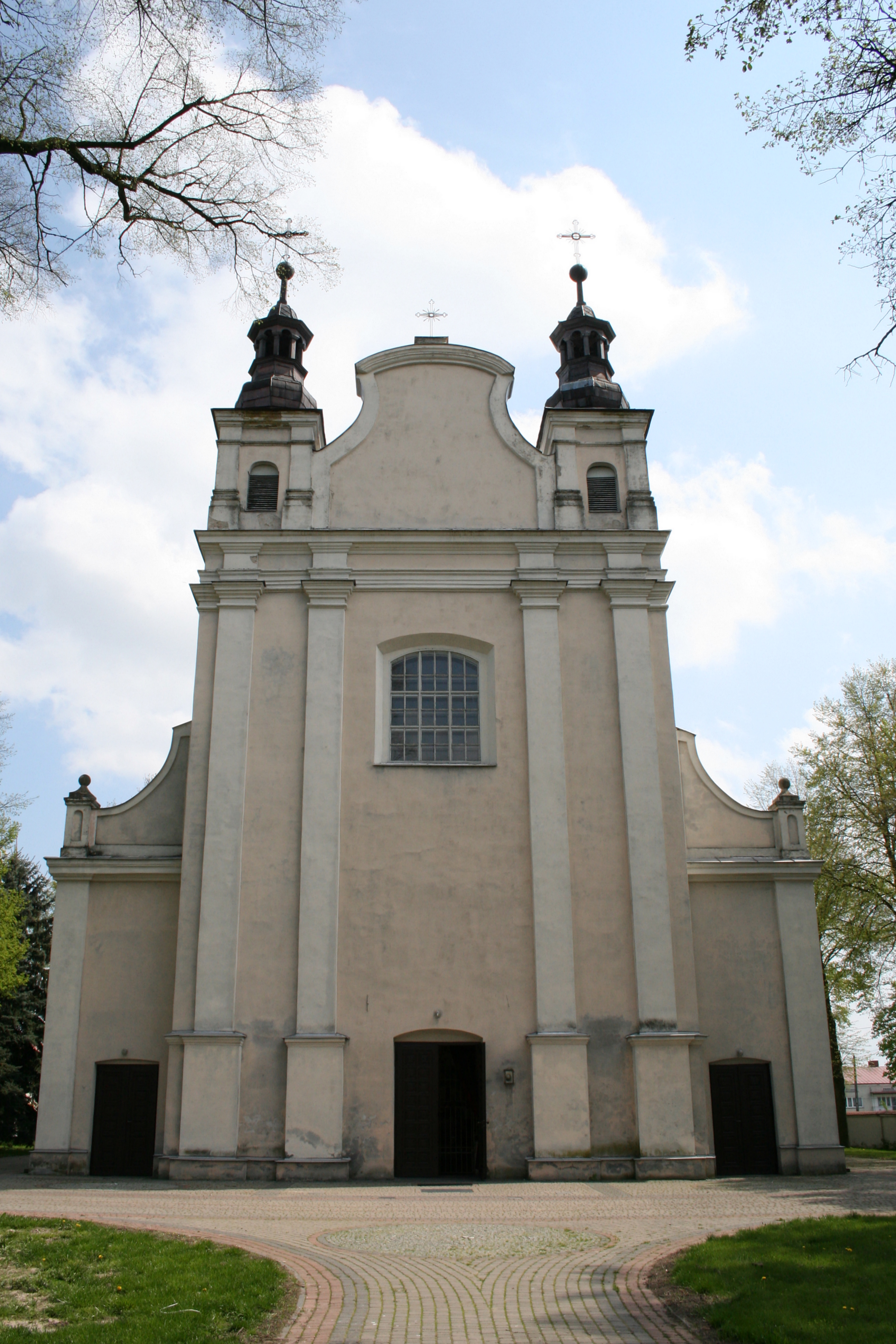

- Location within Poland
- Coordinates: 52°15′N 22°21′E
- Country: Poland
- Voivodeship: Masovian
- County: Siedlce
- Gmina: Suchożebry

Krześlin (pronounced: [ˈkʂɛɕlin]) is a village in the administrative district of Gmina Suchożebry, within Siedlce County, Masovian Voivodeship, in east-central Poland.
