= Izdebki-Kosny =

- Village
- Location within Poland
- Coordinates: 52°6′15″N 22°35′54″E
- Country: Poland
- Voivodeship: Masovian
- County: Siedlce
- Gmina: Zbuczyn

Izdebki-Kosny [izˈdɛpki ˈkɔsnɨ] is a village in the administrative district of Gmina Zbuczyn, within Siedlce County, Masovian Voivodeship, in east-central Poland.
