= Sosna-Kicki =

- Village
- Location within Poland
- Coordinates: 52°18′24″N 22°15′20″E
- Country: Poland
- Voivodeship: Masovian
- County: Siedlce
- Gmina: Suchożebry

Sosna-Kicki [ˈsɔsna ˈkit͡ski] is a village in the administrative district of Gmina Suchożebry, within Siedlce County, Masovian Voivodeship, in east-central Poland.
