= Zawady, Gmina Zbuczyn =

Zawady
- Village
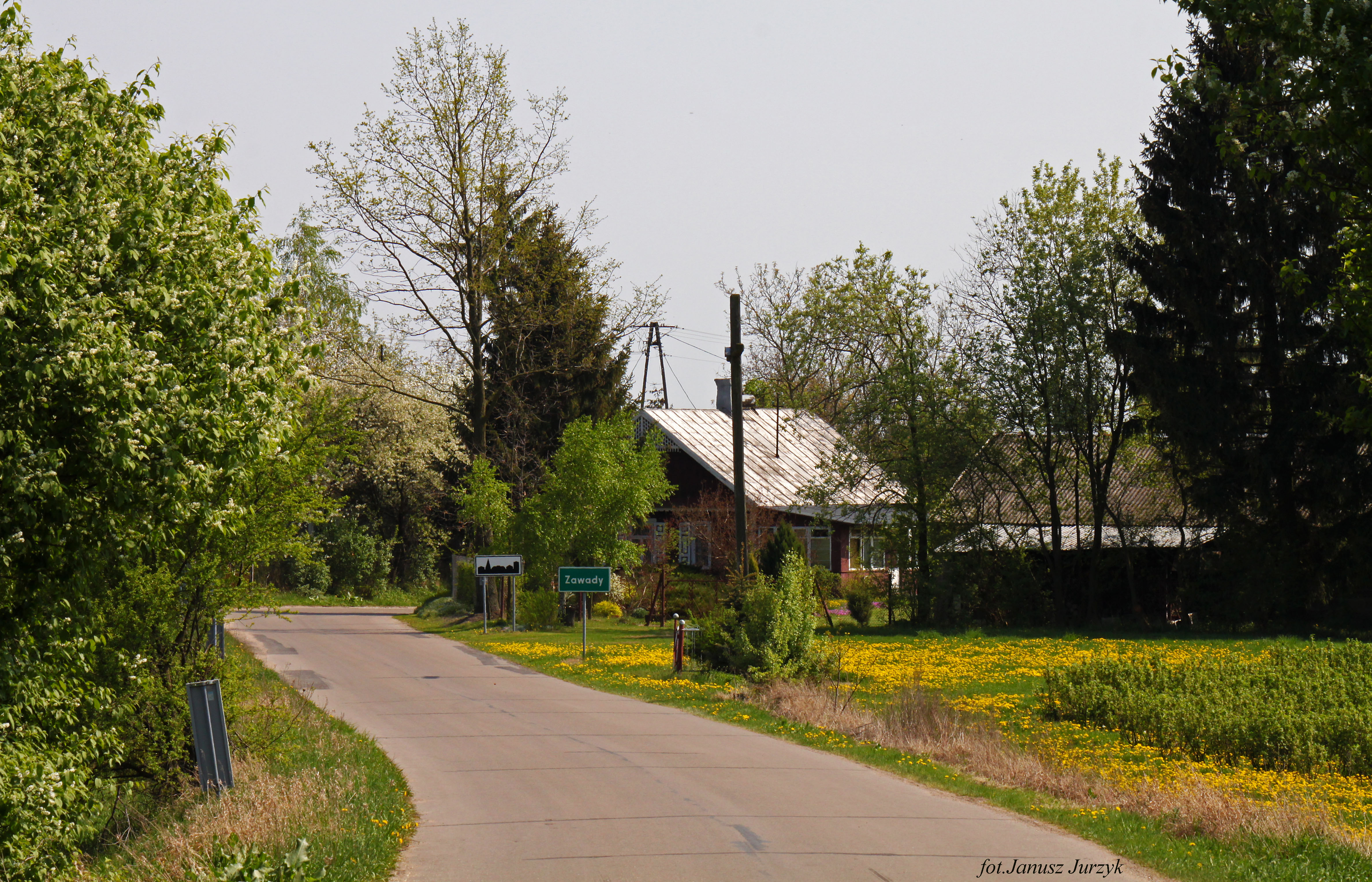

- Location within Poland
- Coordinates: 52°03′41″N 22°33′22″E
- Country: Poland
- Voivodeship: Masovian
- County: Siedlce
- Gmina: Zbuczyn

Zawady [zaˈvadɨ] is a village in the administrative district of Gmina Zbuczyn, within Siedlce County, Masovian Voivodeship, in east-central Poland.
