= Stary Krzesk =

- Village
- Location within Poland
- Coordinates: 52°4′16″N 22°33′26″E
- Country: Poland
- Voivodeship: Masovian
- County: Siedlce
- Gmina: Zbuczyn

Stary Krzesk [ˈstarɨ ˈkʂɛsk] is a village in the administrative district of Gmina Zbuczyn, within Siedlce County, Masovian Voivodeship, in east-central Poland.
