= Ługi-Rętki =

- Village
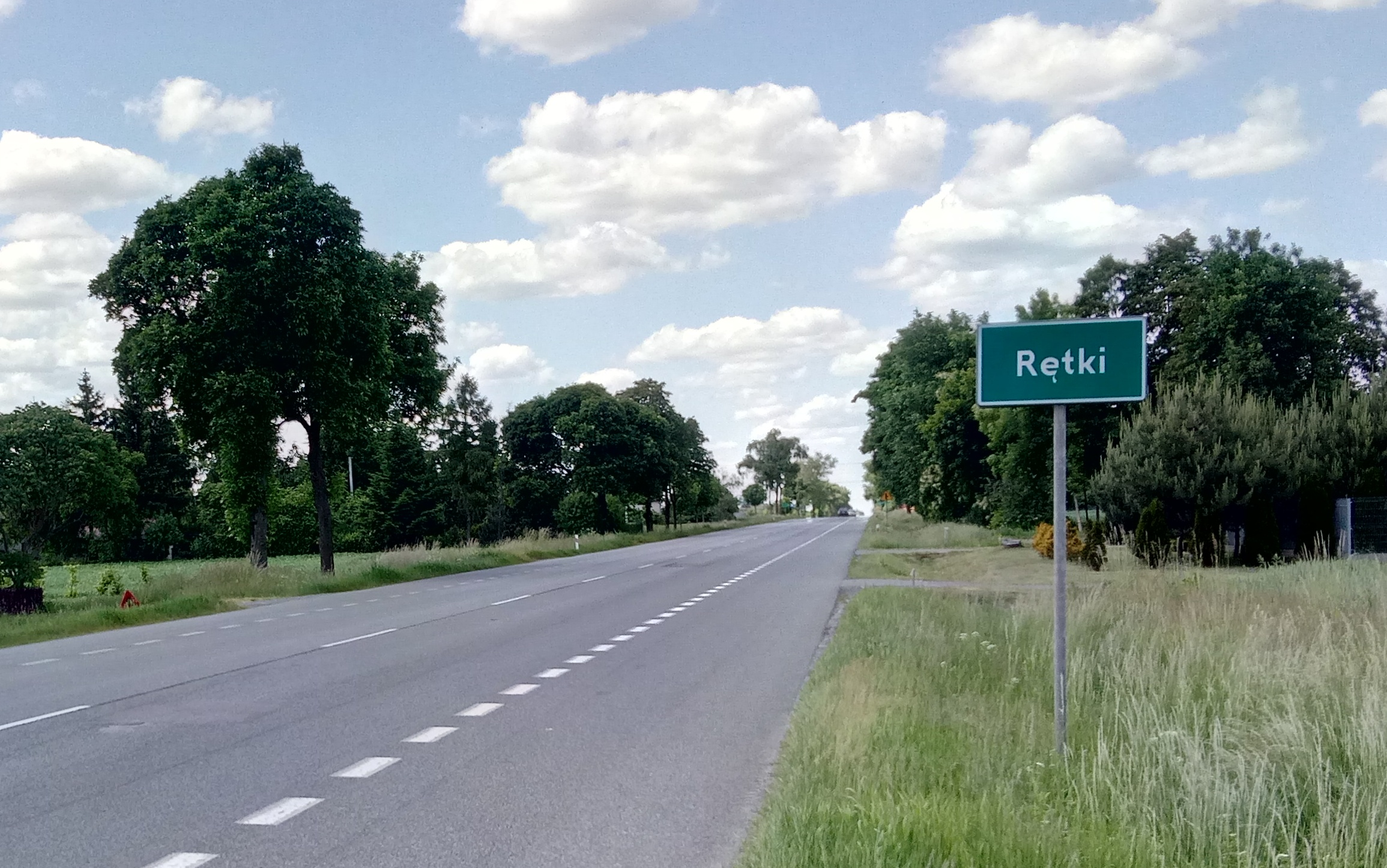

- Location within Poland
- Coordinates: 52°07′10″N 22°22′44″E
- Country: Poland
- Voivodeship: Masovian
- County: Siedlce
- Gmina: Zbuczyn

Ługi-Rętki [ˈwuɡi ˈrɛntki] is a village in the administrative district of Gmina Zbuczyn, within Siedlce County, Masovian Voivodeship, in east-central Poland.
