= Smolanka =

Smolanka may refer to the following places:

- Smolanka, Masovian Voivodeship (east-central Poland)
- Smolanka, Podlaskie Voivodeship (north-east Poland)
- Smolanka, Warmian-Masurian Voivodeship (north Poland)
