= Olędy, Gmina Zbuczyn =

Olędy
- Village
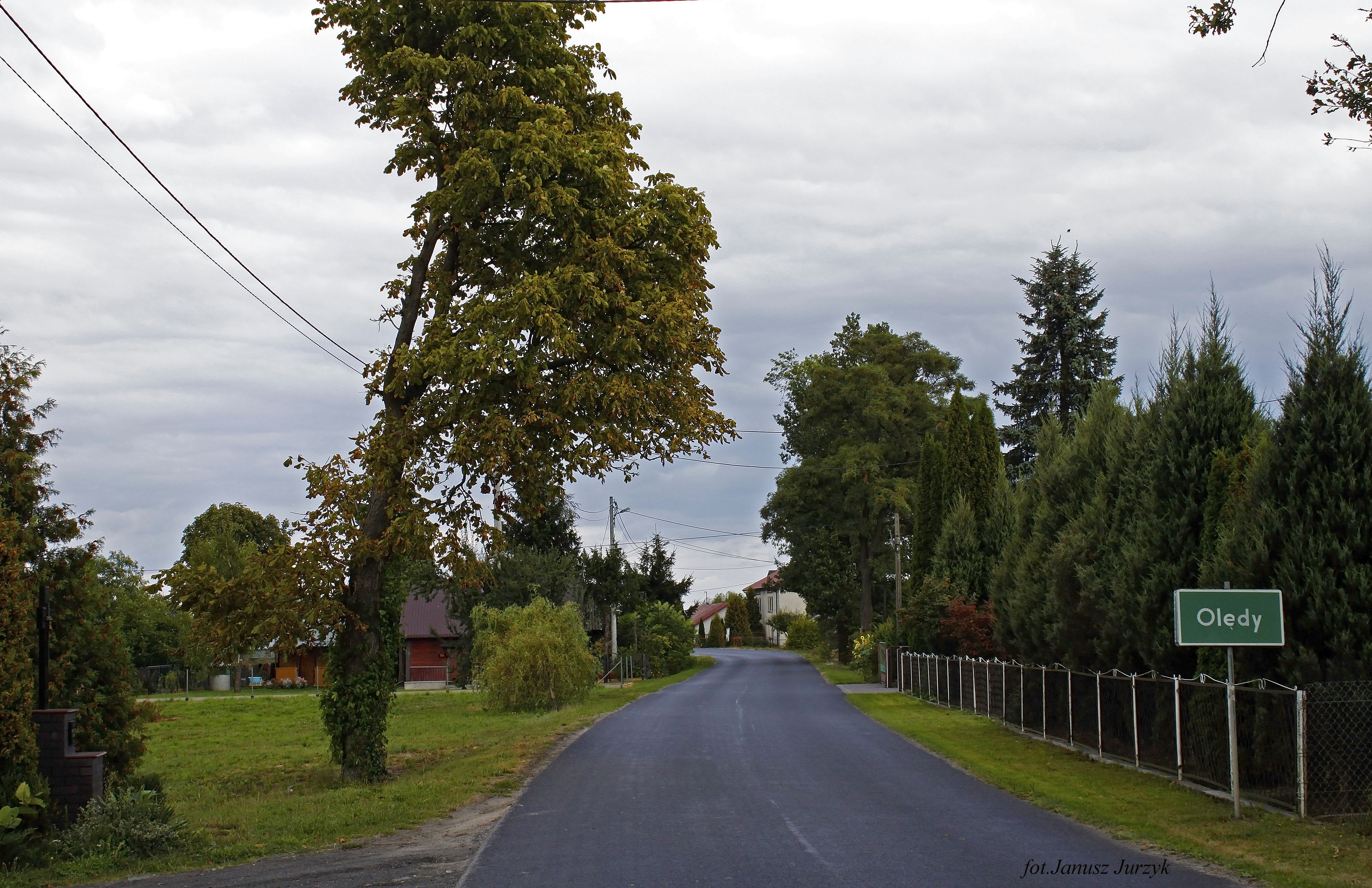
- Street of Olędy, Gmina Zbuczyn

- Location within Poland
- Coordinates: 52°08′47″N 22°26′54″E
- Country: Poland
- Voivodeship: Masovian
- County: Siedlce
- Gmina: Zbuczyn

Olędy [ɔˈlɛndɨ] is a village in the administrative district of Gmina Zbuczyn, within Siedlce County, Masovian Voivodeship, in east-central Poland.
