= Lipiny, Gmina Zbuczyn =

Lipiny
- Village
- Location within Poland
- Coordinates: 52°07′51″N 22°22′54″E
- Country: Poland
- Voivodeship: Masovian
- County: Siedlce
- Gmina: Zbuczyn

Lipiny [liˈpinɨ] is a village in the administrative district of Gmina Zbuczyn, within Siedlce County, Masovian Voivodeship, in east-central Poland.
