= Przywory Małe =

- Village
- Location within Poland
- Coordinates: 52°4′N 22°11′E
- Country: Poland
- Voivodeship: Masovian
- County: Siedlce
- Gmina: Domanice

Przywory Małe [pʂɨˈvɔrɨ ˈmawɛ] is a village in the administrative district of Gmina Domanice, within Siedlce County, Masovian Voivodeship, in east-central Poland.
