= Stany Duże =

- Village
- Location within Poland
- Coordinates: 52°18′N 22°16′E
- Country: Poland
- Voivodeship: Masovian
- County: Siedlce
- Gmina: Suchożebry

Stany Duże [ˈstanɨ ˈduʐɛ] is a village in the administrative district of Gmina Suchożebry, within Siedlce County, Masovian Voivodeship, in east-central Poland.
