= Dziewule =

- Village
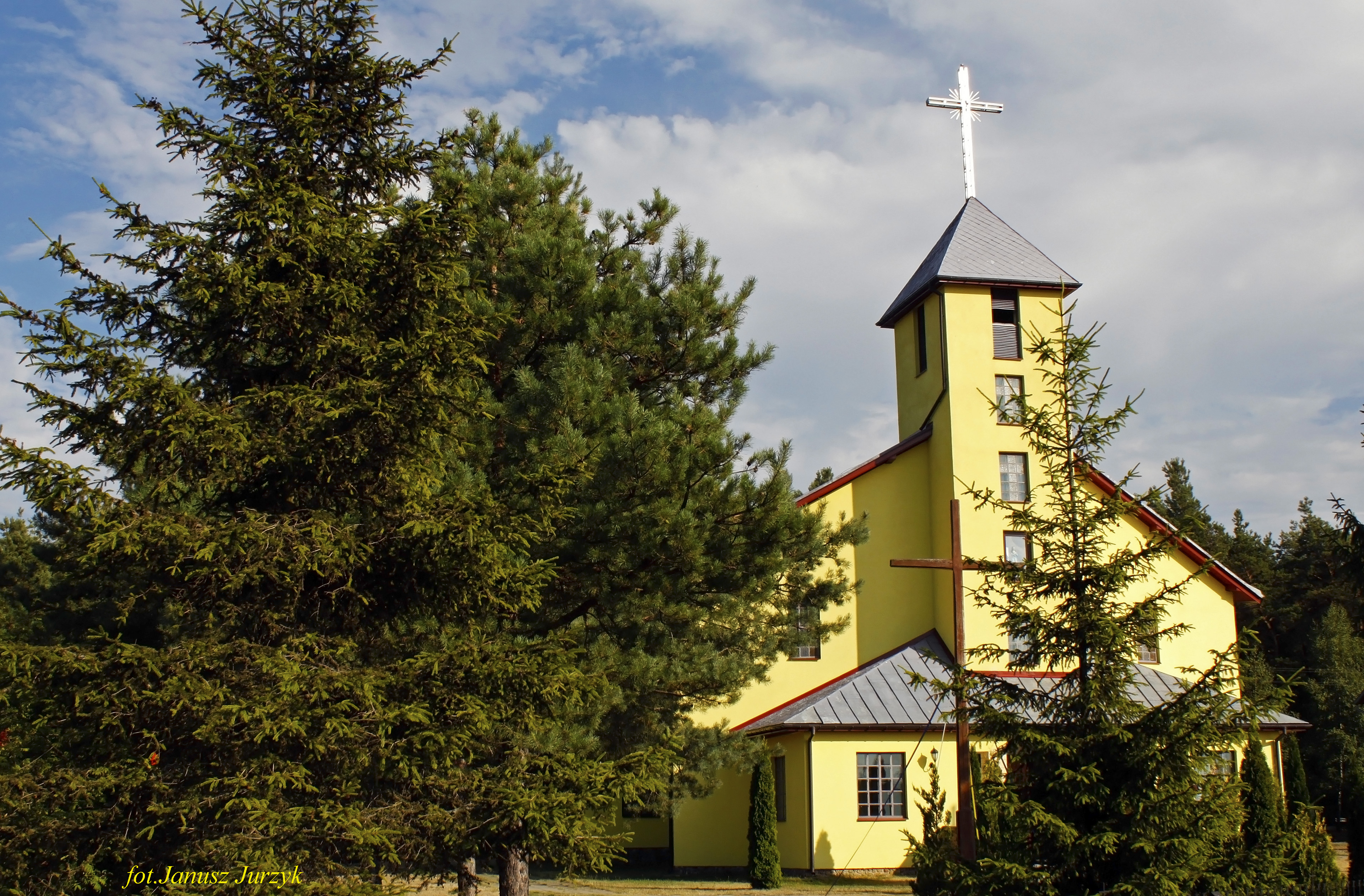

- Location within Poland
- Coordinates: 52°3′N 22°24′E
- Country: Poland
- Voivodeship: Masovian
- County: Siedlce
- Gmina: Zbuczyn

Dziewule [d͡ʑɛˈvulɛ] is a village in the administrative district of Gmina Zbuczyn, within Siedlce County, Masovian Voivodeship, in east-central Poland.
