= Lucynów, Siedlce County =

Lucynów
- Village
- Location within Poland
- Coordinates: 52°08′48″N 22°27′53″E
- Country: Poland
- Voivodeship: Masovian
- County: Siedlce
- Gmina: Zbuczyn

Lucynów [luˈt͡sɨnuf] is a village in the administrative district of Gmina Zbuczyn, within Siedlce County, Masovian Voivodeship, in east-central Poland.
