= Czuryły =

- Village
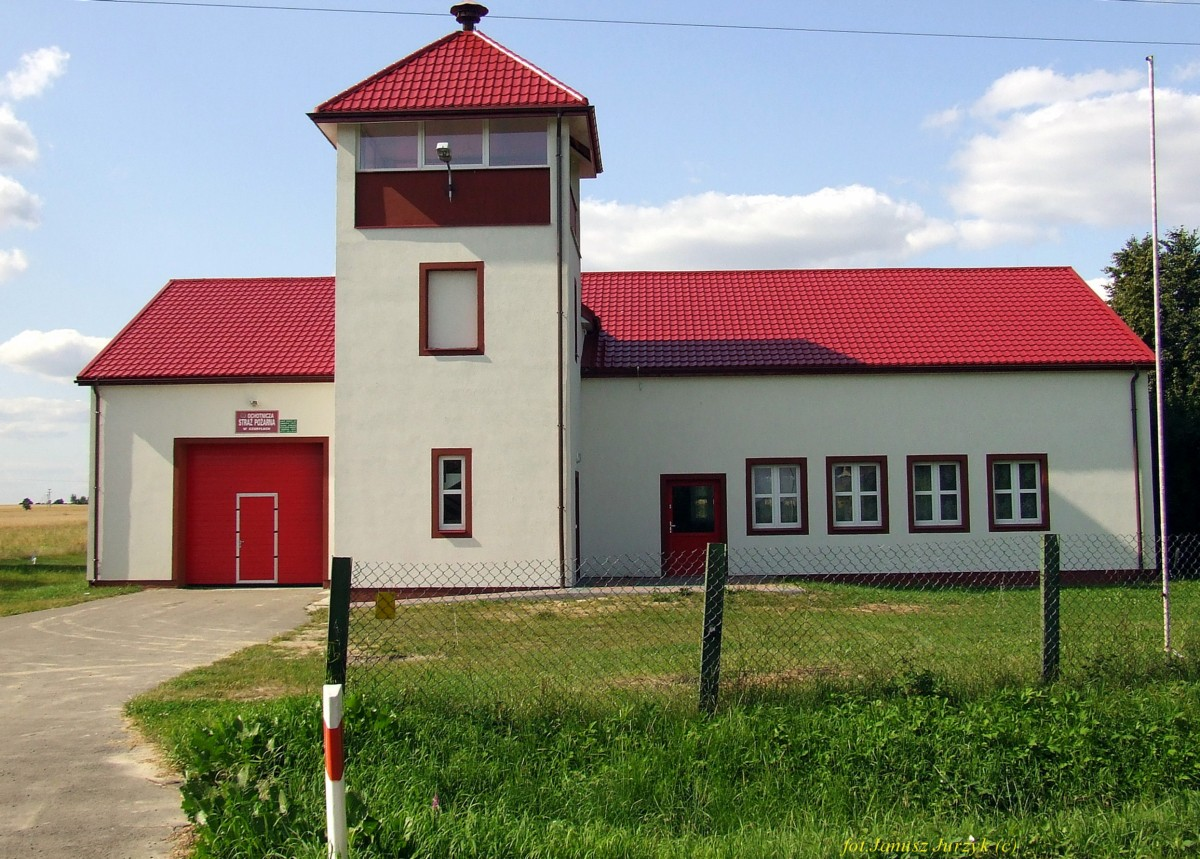
- Fire station in Czuryły

- Location within Poland
- Coordinates: 52°9′N 22°26′E
- Country: Poland
- Voivodeship: Masovian
- County: Siedlce
- Gmina: Zbuczyn
- Time zone: UTC+1 (CET)
  - Summer (DST): UTC+2 (CEST)

Czuryły [t͡ʂuˈrɨwɨ] is a village in the administrative district of Gmina Zbuczyn, within Siedlce County, Masovian Voivodeship, in east-central Poland.

Six Polish citizens were murdered by Nazi Germany in the village during World War II.
