= Kwasy, Masovian Voivodeship =

Kwasy
- Village
- Location within Poland
- Coordinates: 52°6′N 22°33′E
- Country: Poland
- Voivodeship: Masovian
- County: Siedlce
- Gmina: Zbuczyn

Kwasy [ˈkfasɨ] is a village in the administrative district of Gmina Zbuczyn, within Siedlce County, Masovian Voivodeship, in east-central Poland.
