= Pieńki, Gmina Domanice =

Pieńki
- Village
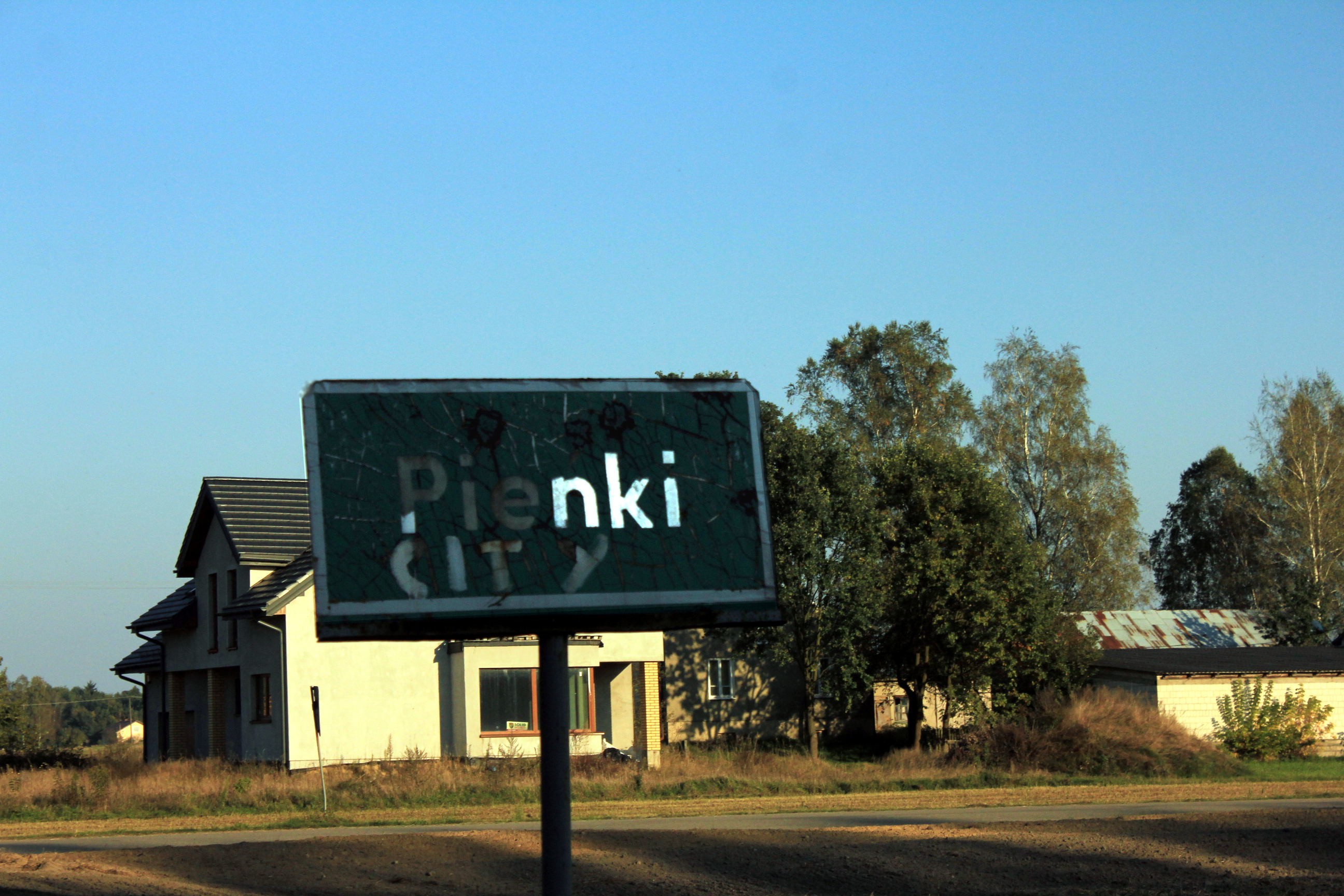

- Location within Poland
- Coordinates: 52°02′57″N 22°12′30″E
- Country: Poland
- Voivodeship: Masovian
- County: Siedlce
- Gmina: Domanice

Pieńki [ˈpjɛɲki] is a village in the administrative district of Gmina Domanice, within Siedlce County, Masovian Voivodeship, in east-central Poland.
