= Borki Siedleckie =

- Village
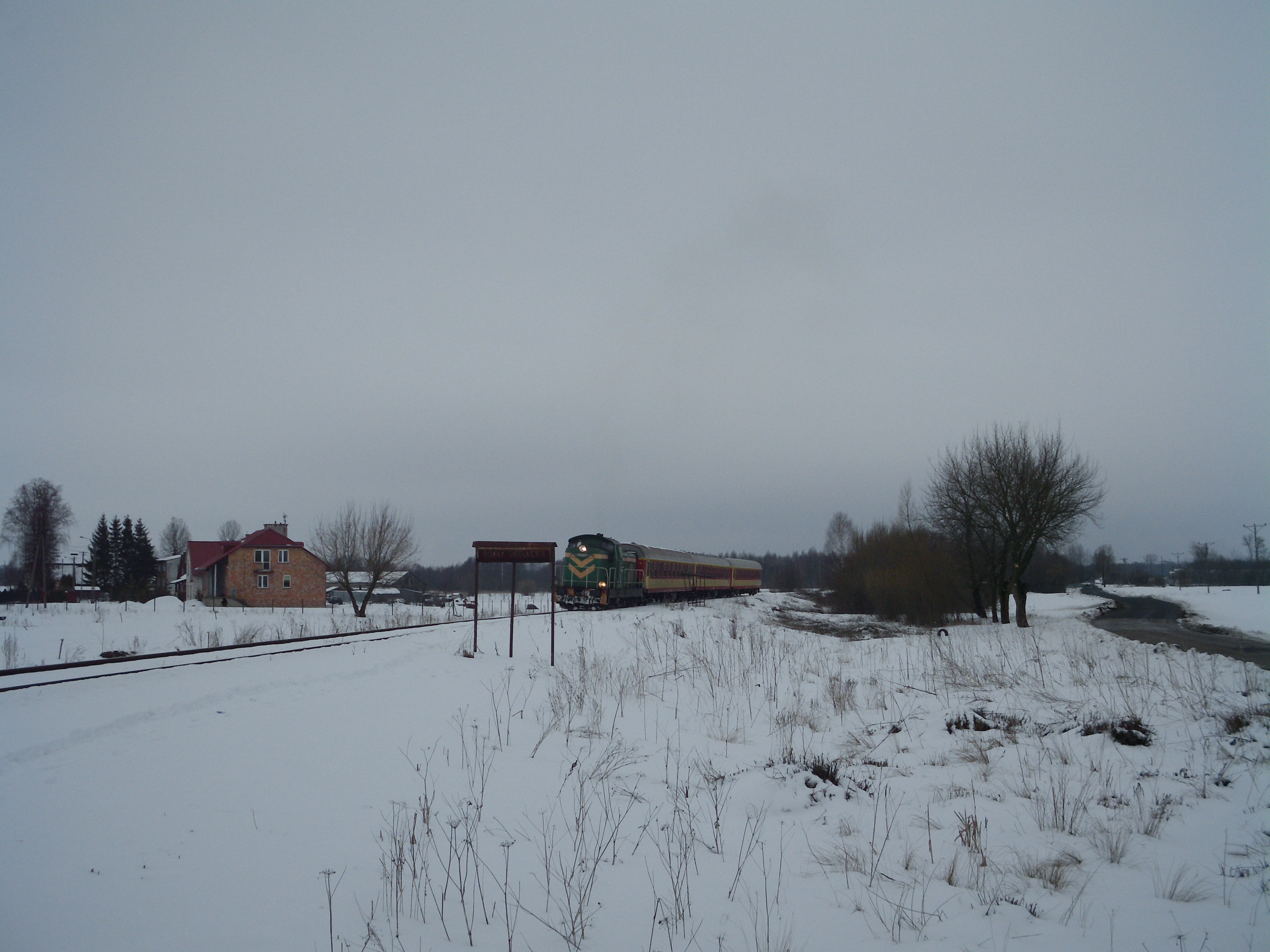

- Location within Poland
- Coordinates: 52°13′51″N 22°17′7″E
- Country: Poland
- Voivodeship: Masovian
- County: Siedlce
- Gmina: Suchożebry

Borki Siedleckie [ˈbɔrki ɕɛˈdlɛt͡skʲɛ] is a village in the administrative district of Gmina Suchożebry, within Siedlce County, Masovian Voivodeship, in east-central Poland.
