= Podzdrój =

- Village
- Location within Poland
- Coordinates: 52°3′12″N 22°10′44″E
- Country: Poland
- Voivodeship: Masovian
- County: Siedlce
- Gmina: Domanice

Podzdrój [ˈpɔd͡zdrui̯] is a village in the administrative district of Gmina Domanice, within Siedlce County, Masovian Voivodeship, in east-central Poland.
