= Sosna-Trojanki =

- Village
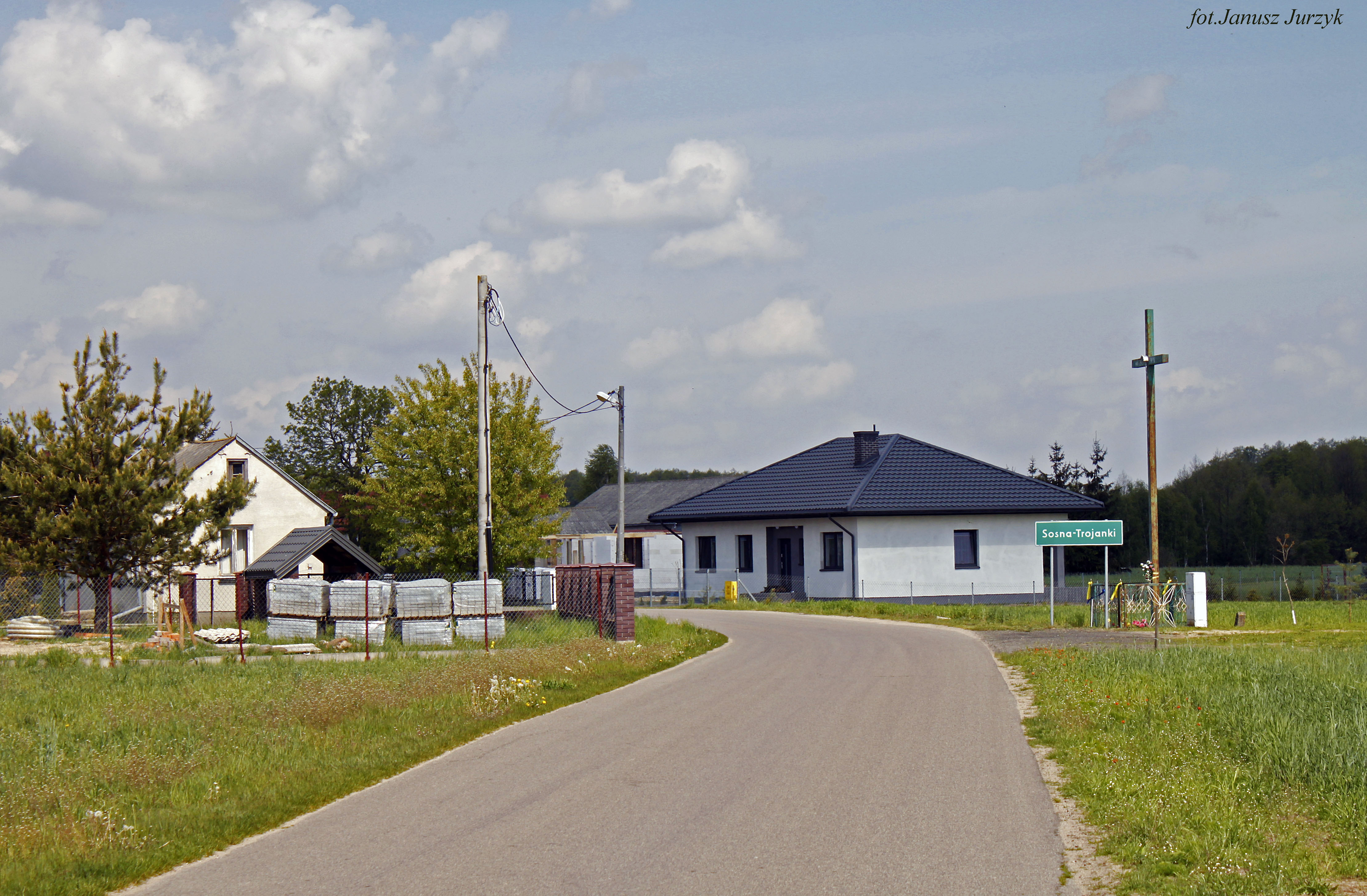

- Location within Poland
- Coordinates: 52°16′38″N 22°13′31″E
- Country: Poland
- Voivodeship: Masovian
- County: Siedlce
- Gmina: Suchożebry

Sosna-Trojanki [ˈsɔsna trɔˈjaŋki] is a village in the administrative district of Gmina Suchożebry, within Siedlce County, Masovian Voivodeship, in east-central Poland.
