= Modrzew, Siedlce County =

Modrzew
- Village
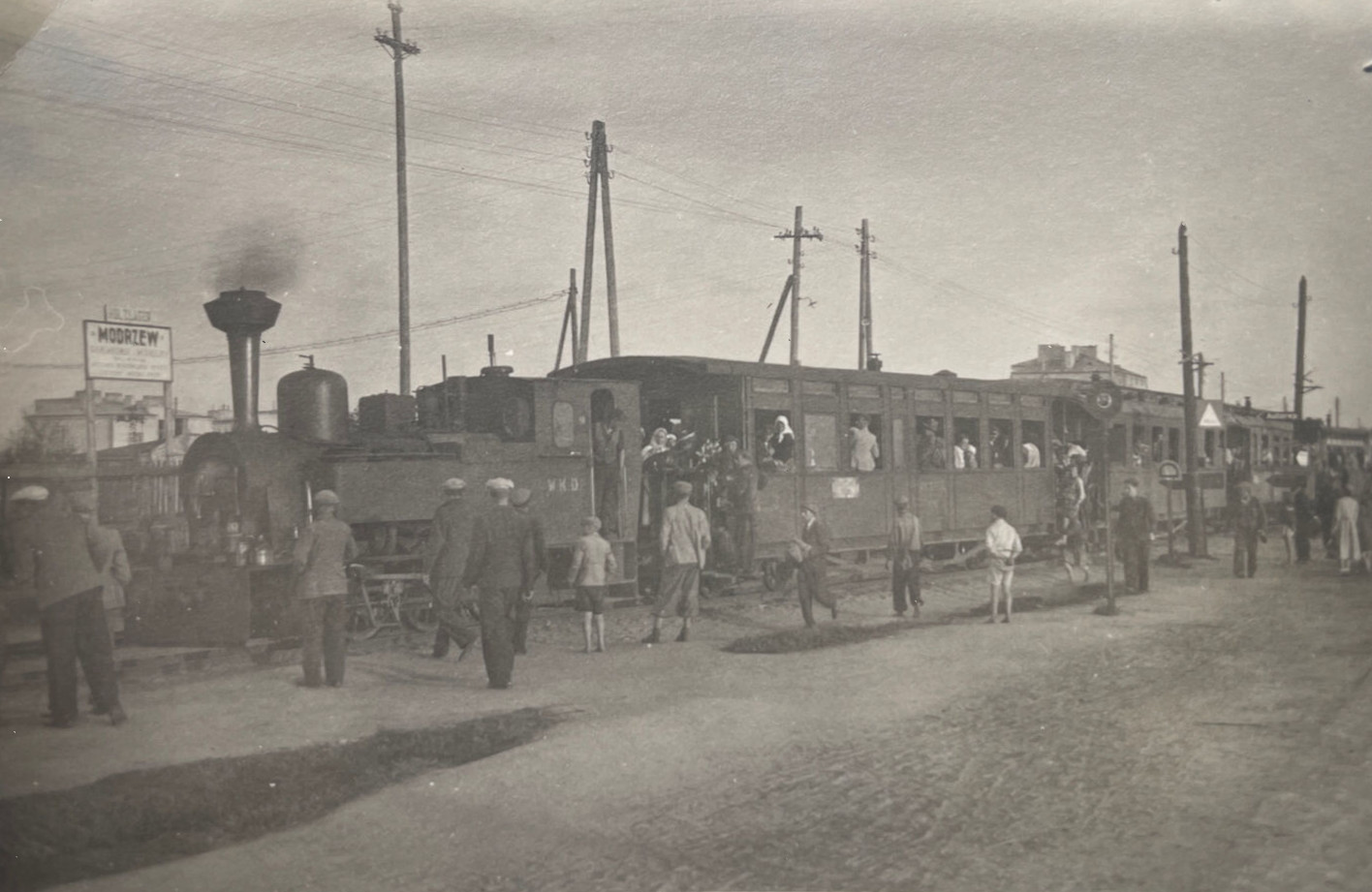
- Narrow gauge railway at Modrzew, 1925

- Location within Poland
- Coordinates: 52°7′N 22°32′E
- Country: Poland
- Voivodeship: Masovian
- County: Siedlce
- Gmina: Zbuczyn

Modrzew [ˈmɔdʐɛf] is a village in the administrative district of Gmina Zbuczyn, within Siedlce County, Masovian Voivodeship, in east-central Poland.
