= Borki-Kosy =

Borki Kosy
- Village
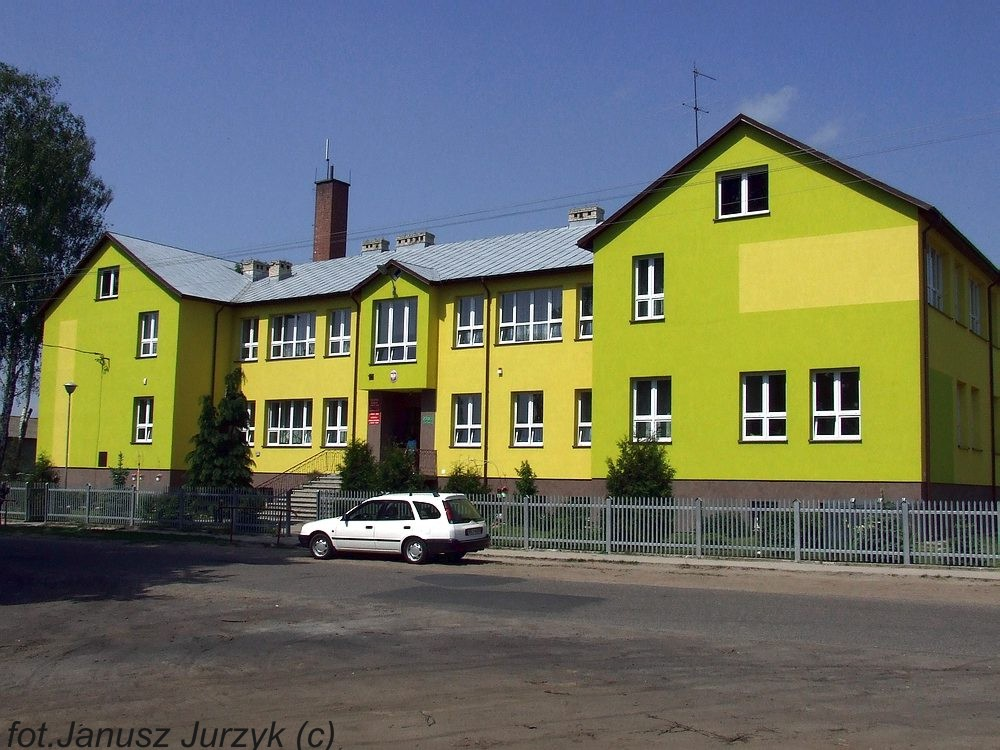

- Location within Poland
- Coordinates: 52°5′18″N 22°21′43″E
- Country: Poland
- Voivodeship: Masovian
- County: Siedlce
- Gmina: Zbuczyn
- Elevation: 106 m (348 ft)
- Population (approx.): 260

Borki Kosy [ˈbɔrki ˈkɔsɨ] is a village in the administrative district of Gmina Zbuczyn, within Siedlce County, Masovian Voivodeship, in east-central Poland.

The village is located on the Warsaw - Terespol train line, and there is train station. There is school complex of pre-school, primary school and gymnasium. The village has a chapel and one shop.
