= Sosna-Korabie =

- Village
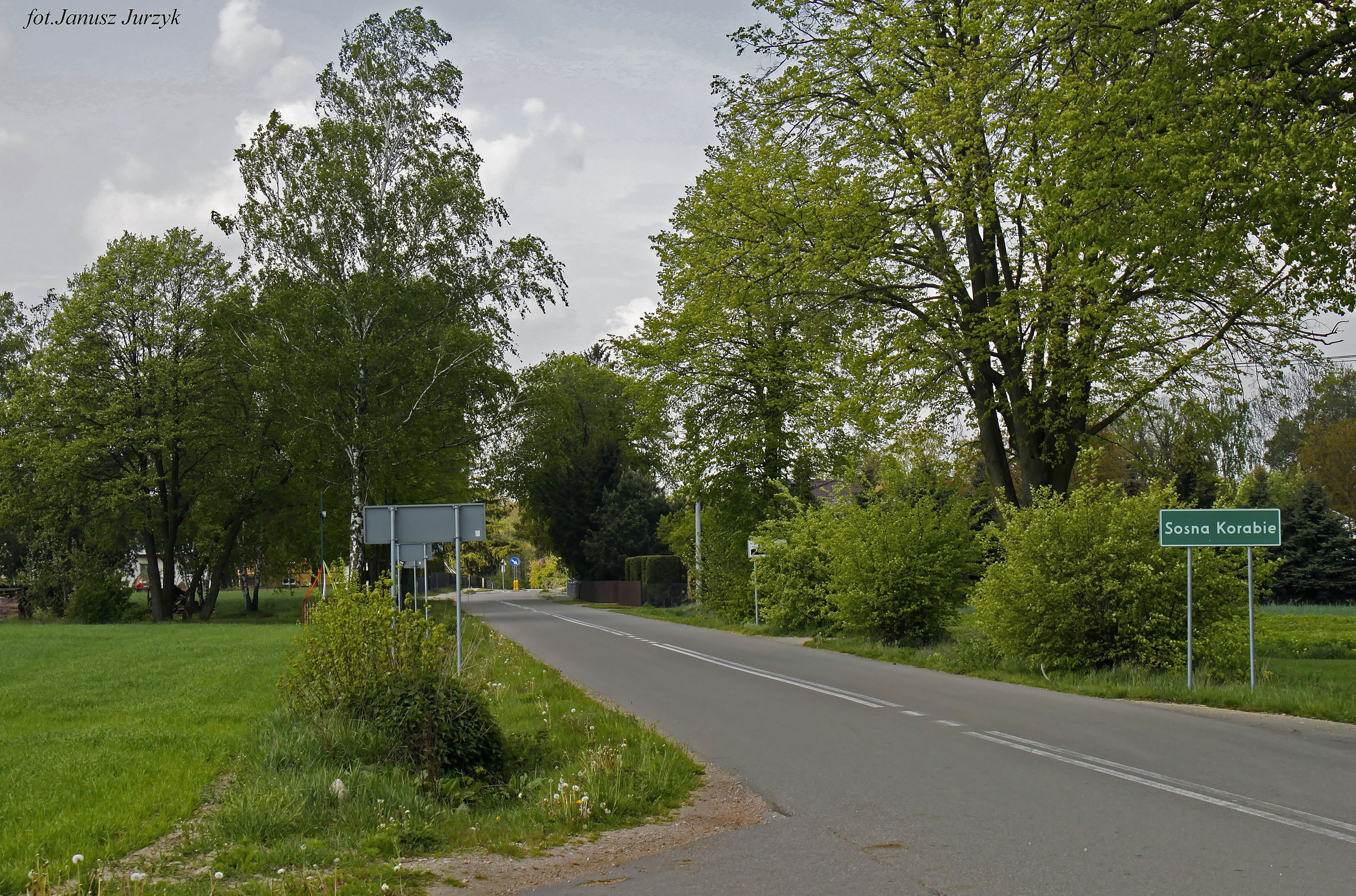

- Location within Poland
- Coordinates: 52°16′58″N 22°12′39″E
- Country: Poland
- Voivodeship: Masovian
- County: Siedlce
- Gmina: Suchożebry

Sosna-Korabie [ˈsɔsna kɔˈrabjɛ] is a village in the administrative district of Gmina Suchożebry, within Siedlce County, Masovian Voivodeship, in east-central Poland.
