= Śmiary-Kolonia =

- Village
- Location within Poland
- Coordinates: 52°02′10″N 22°12′12″E
- Country: Poland
- Voivodeship: Masovian
- County: Siedlce
- Gmina: Domanice

Śmiary-Kolonia [ˈɕmjarɨ kɔˈlɔɲa] is a village in the administrative district of Gmina Domanice, within Siedlce County, Masovian Voivodeship, in east-central Poland.

== See also ==
- Śmiary
