= Czachy, Masovian Voivodeship =

Czachy
- Village
- Location within Poland
- Coordinates: 52°2′N 22°8′E
- Country: Poland
- Voivodeship: Masovian
- County: Siedlce
- Gmina: Domanice

Czachy [ˈt͡ʂaxɨ] is a village in the administrative district of Gmina Domanice, within Siedlce County, Masovian Voivodeship, in east-central Poland.
