= Olszyc Szlachecki =

- Village
- Location within Poland
- Coordinates: 52°01′37″N 22°06′29″E
- Country: Poland
- Voivodeship: Masovian
- County: Siedlce
- Gmina: Domanice

Olszyc Szlachecki (Polish pronunciation: [ˈɔlʂɨts ʂlaˈxɛtskʲi]) is a village in the administrative district of Gmina Domanice, within Siedlce County, Masovian Voivodeship, in east-central Poland.
