= Smolanka, Masovian Voivodeship =

Smolanka
- Village
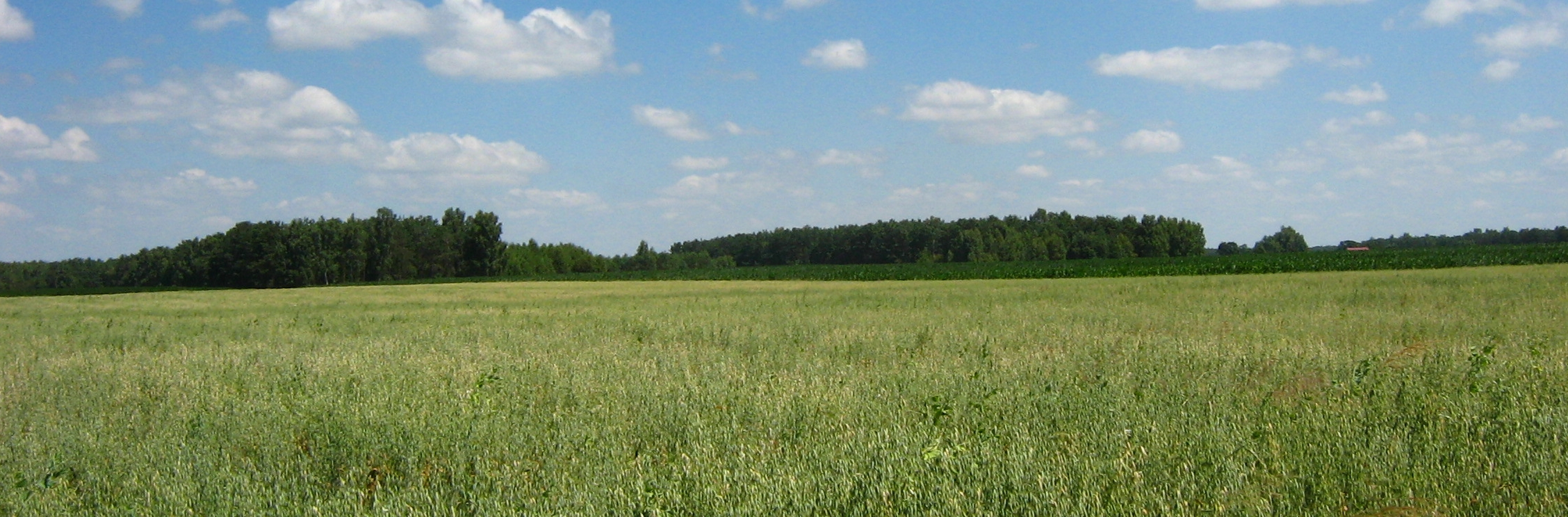
- Fields in Smolanka

- Location within Poland
- Coordinates: 52°1′32″N 22°24′31″E
- Country: Poland
- Voivodeship: Masovian
- County: Siedlce
- Gmina: Zbuczyn
- Time zone: UTC+1 (CET)
  - Summer (DST): UTC+2 (CEST)

Smolanka [smɔˈlaŋka] is a village in the administrative district of Gmina Zbuczyn, within Siedlce County, Masovian Voivodeship, in east-central Poland.

Five Polish citizens were murdered by Nazi Germany in the village during World War II.
