= Olszyc Włościański =

- Village
- Location within Poland
- Coordinates: 52°1′25″N 22°6′4″E
- Country: Poland
- Voivodeship: Masovian
- County: Siedlce
- Gmina: Domanice
- Population: 230

Olszyc Włościański (Polish pronunciation: [ˈɔlʂɨts fwɔɕˈtɕaj̃skʲi]) is a village in the administrative district of Gmina Domanice, within Siedlce County, Masovian Voivodeship, in east-central Poland.
