= Suchożebry =

- Village
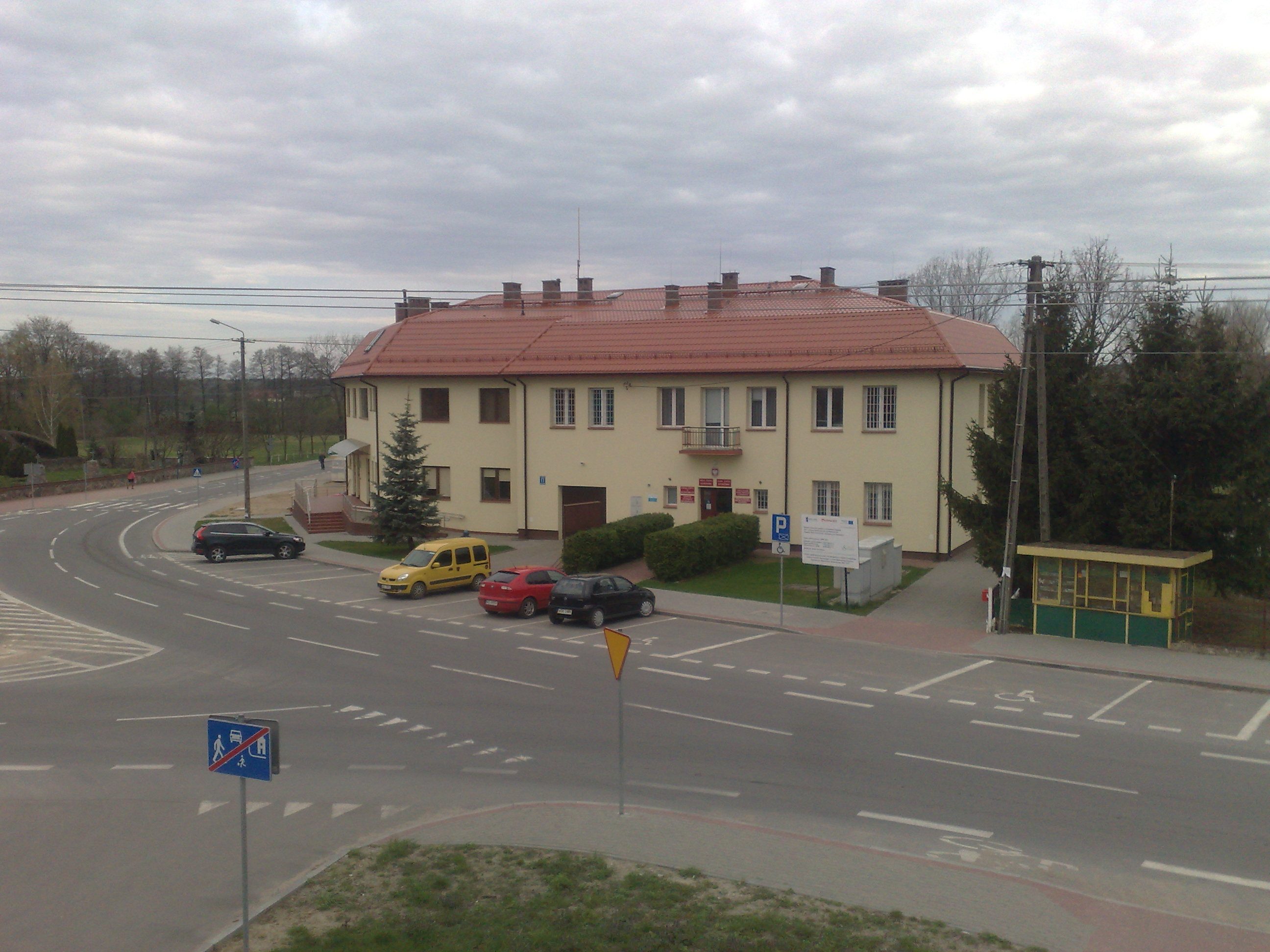

- Location within Poland
- Coordinates: 52°16′N 22°15′E
- Country: Poland
- Voivodeship: Masovian
- County: Siedlce
- Gmina: Suchożebry

Population
  - Total: 586
- Time zone: UTC+1 (CET)
  - Summer (DST): UTC+2 (CEST)
- Vehicle registration: WSI

Suchożebry [suxɔˈʐɛbrɨ] is a village in Siedlce County, Masovian Voivodeship, in eastern Poland. It is the seat of the gmina (administrative district) called Gmina Suchożebry.

== History ==
In 1827, it had a population of 155. During the German occupation of Poland (World War II), the Germans operated a section of the Stalag 366 prisoner-of-war camp for Allied POWs near the village.
