= Zbuczyn =

- Village
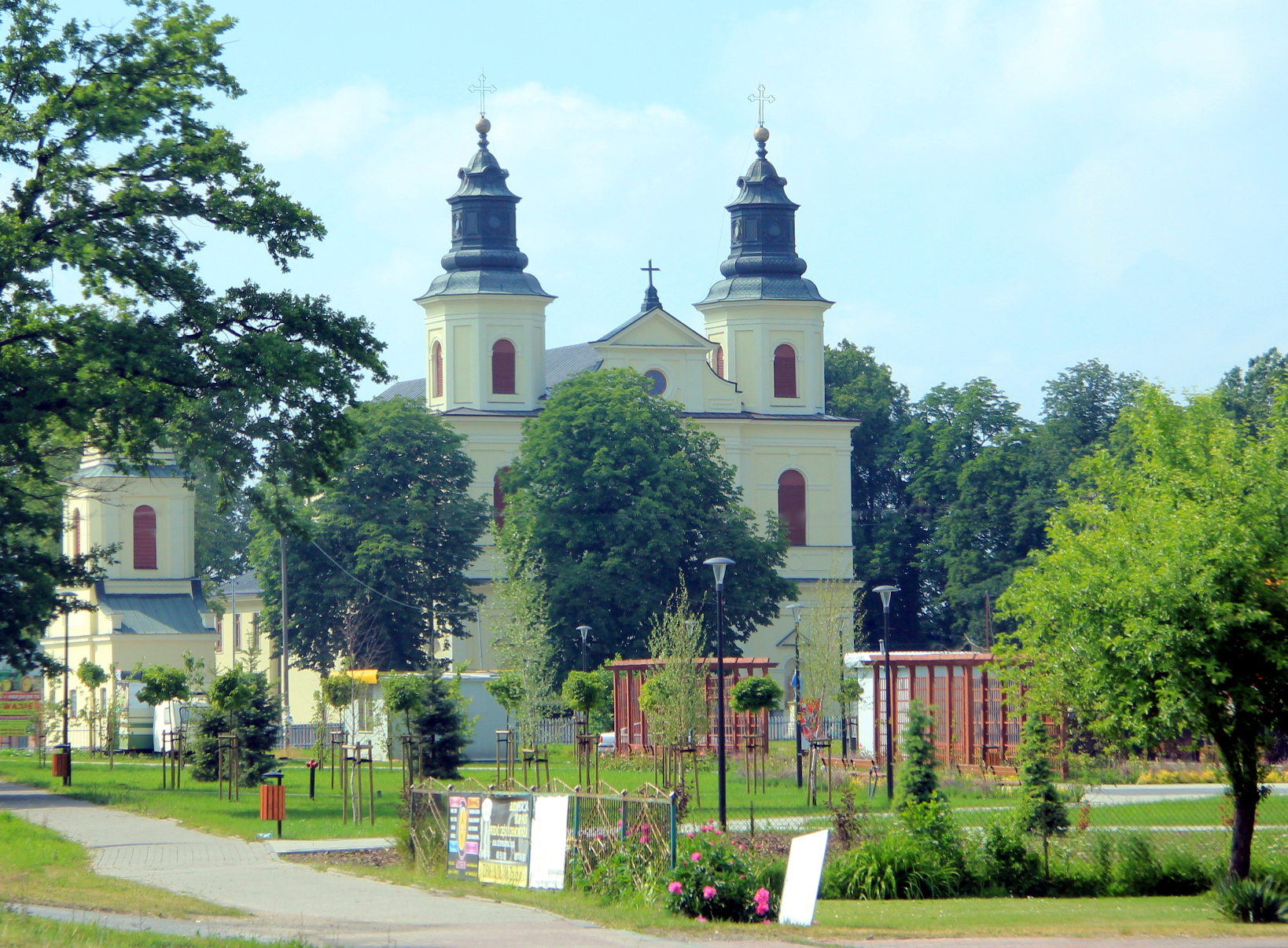
- Church of Saint Stanislas

- Location within Poland
- Coordinates: 52°5′12″N 22°26′10″E
- Country: Poland
- Voivodeship: Masovian
- County: Siedlce
- Gmina: Zbuczyn

Population
  - Total: 1,836
- Time zone: UTC+1 (CET)
  - Summer (DST): UTC+2 (CEST)
- Postal code: 08-106
- Vehicle registration: WSI
- Website: http://www.zbuczyn.pl

Zbuczyn [ˈzbut͡ʂɨn] is a village in Siedlce County, Masovian Voivodeship, in east-central Poland. It is the seat of the gmina (administrative district) called Gmina Zbuczyn. It is situated on the Zbuczynka River.

== History ==
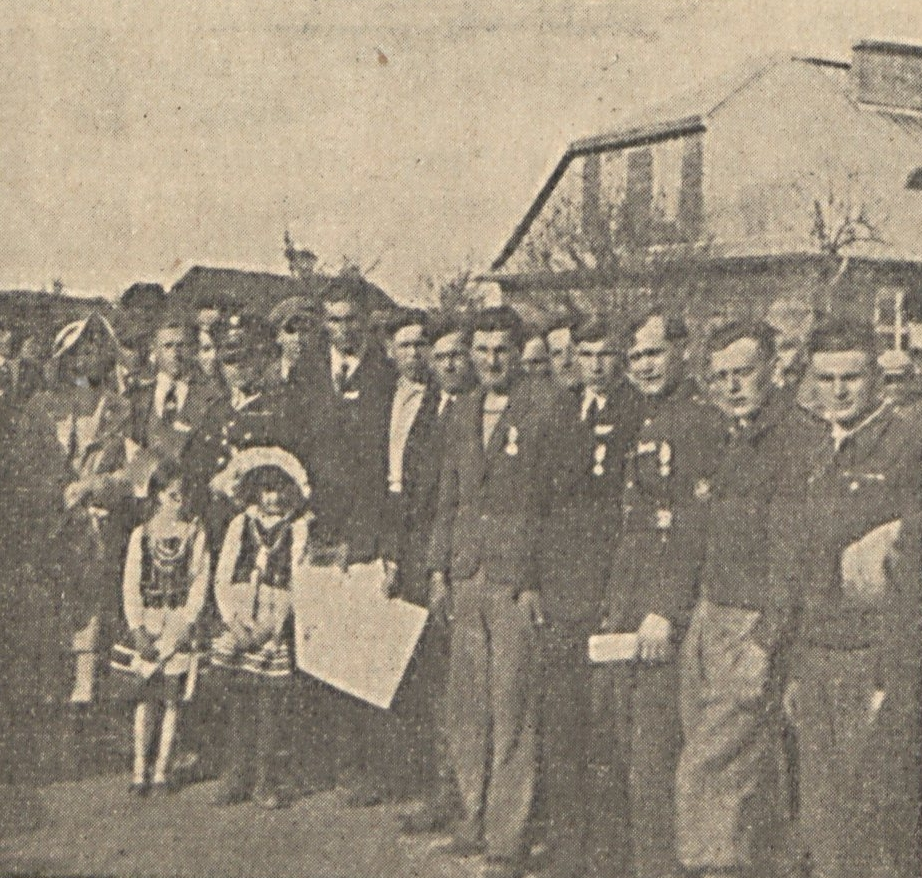
Cycling competition of the Zbuczyn branch of the Riflemen's Association in 1936

The history of Zbuczyn dates back to the 14th century. It was administratively located in the Łuków Land in the Lublin Voivodeship in the Lesser Poland Province of the Kingdom of Poland. In 1418, King Władysław II Jagiełło established here a Roman Catholic parish, also granting Magdeburg rights to the village. Zbuczyn lost its commercial importance in the face of the development of nearby Siedlce and Międzyrzec Podlaski, and local innkeepers eventually changed their profession to farming. Zbuczyn remained a town for some 350 years, as on October 11, 1750, King Augustus III of Poland officially turned it back to the status of a village.

In the Third Partition of Poland in 1795, Zbuczyn was annexed by Austria. After the Polish victory in the Austro-Polish War of 1809, it became part of the short-lived Duchy of Warsaw, and after the duchy's dissolution in 1815, it became part of Russian-controlled Congress Poland, in which it remained until World War I.

Following the German-Soviet invasion of Poland, which started World War II in September 1939, the village was occupied by Germany until 1944.
