= Gmina Suchożebry =

Gmina Suchożebry Suchożebry Commune
- Gmina
- Interactive map of Gmina Suchożebry
- Coordinates (Suchożebry): 52°16′N 22°15′E
- Country: Poland
- Voivodeship: Masovian
- County: Siedlce County
- Seat: Suchożebry

Area
  - Total: 100.71 km^{2} (38.88 sq mi)

Population (2014)
  - Total: 4,730
  - Density: 47.0/km^{2} (122/sq mi)
- Website: http://www.suchozebry.pl

Gmina Suchożebry is a rural gmina (administrative district) in Siedlce County, Masovian Voivodeship, in east-central Poland. Its seat is the village of Suchożebry, which lies approximately 12 kilometres (7 mi) north of Siedlce and 86 km (53 mi) east of Warsaw.

The gmina covers an area of 100.71 square kilometres (38.9 sq mi), and as of 2006 its total population is 4,598 (4,730 in 2014).

== Villages ==
Gmina Suchożebry contains the villages and settlements of Borki Siedleckie, Brzozów, Kopcie, Kownaciska, Krynica, Krześlin, Krześlinek, Nakory, Podnieśno, Przygody, Sosna-Kicki, Sosna-Korabie, Sosna-Kozółki, Sosna-Trojanki, Stany Duże, Stany Małe, Suchożebry and Wola Suchożebrska.

== Neighbouring gminas ==
Gmina Suchożebry is bordered by the gminas of Bielany, Mokobody, Mordy, Paprotnia and Siedlce.
