= Domanice, Masovian Voivodeship =

Domanice
- Village
- Location within Poland
- Coordinates: 52°2′N 22°10′E
- Country: Poland
- Voivodeship: Masovian
- County: Siedlce
- Gmina: Domanice

Population
  - Total: 304
- Time zone: UTC+1 (CET)
  - Summer (DST): UTC+2 (CEST)

Domanice [dɔmaˈnit͡sɛ] is a village in Siedlce County, Masovian Voivodeship, in east-central Poland. It is the seat of the gmina (administrative district) called Gmina Domanice.

Five Polish citizens were murdered by Nazi Germany in the village during World War II.
