= Olszyc-Folwark =

- Village
- Location within Poland
- Coordinates: 52°00′48″N 22°05′55″E
- Country: Poland
- Voivodeship: Masovian
- County: Siedlce
- Gmina: Domanice

Olszyc-Folwark [ˈɔlʂɨt͡s ˈfɔlvark] is a village in the administrative district of Gmina Domanice, within Siedlce County, Masovian Voivodeship, in east-central Poland.
