= Gmina Domanice =

Gmina Domanice Domanice Commune
- Gmina
- Interactive map of Gmina Domanice
- Coordinates (Domanice): 52°2′13″N 22°10′31″E
- Country: Poland
- Voivodeship: Masovian
- County: Siedlce County
- Seat: Domanice

Area
  - Total: 46.87 km^{2} (18.10 sq mi)

Population (2014)
  - Total: 2,660
  - Density: 56.8/km^{2} (147/sq mi)

Gmina Domanice is a rural gmina (administrative district) in Siedlce County, Masovian Voivodeship, in east-central Poland. Its seat is the village of Domanice, which lies approximately 16 kilometres (10 mi) south-west of Siedlce and 83 km (52 mi) east of Warsaw.

The gmina covers an area of 46.87 square kilometres (18.1 sq mi), and as of 2006 its total population is 2,690 (2,660 in 2014).

== Villages ==
Gmina Domanice contains the villages and settlements of Czachy, Domanice, Domanice-Kolonia, Emilianówka, Kopcie, Olszyc Szlachecki, Olszyc Włościański, Olszyc-Folwark, Pieńki, Podzdrój, Przywory Duże, Przywory Małe, Śmiary-Kolonia and Zażelazna.

== Neighbouring gminas ==
Gmina Domanice is bordered by the gminas of Łuków, Skórzec, Stoczek Łukowski, Wiśniew and Wodynie.
