= Gmina Zbuczyn =

Gmina Zbuczyn Zbuczyn Commune
- Gmina
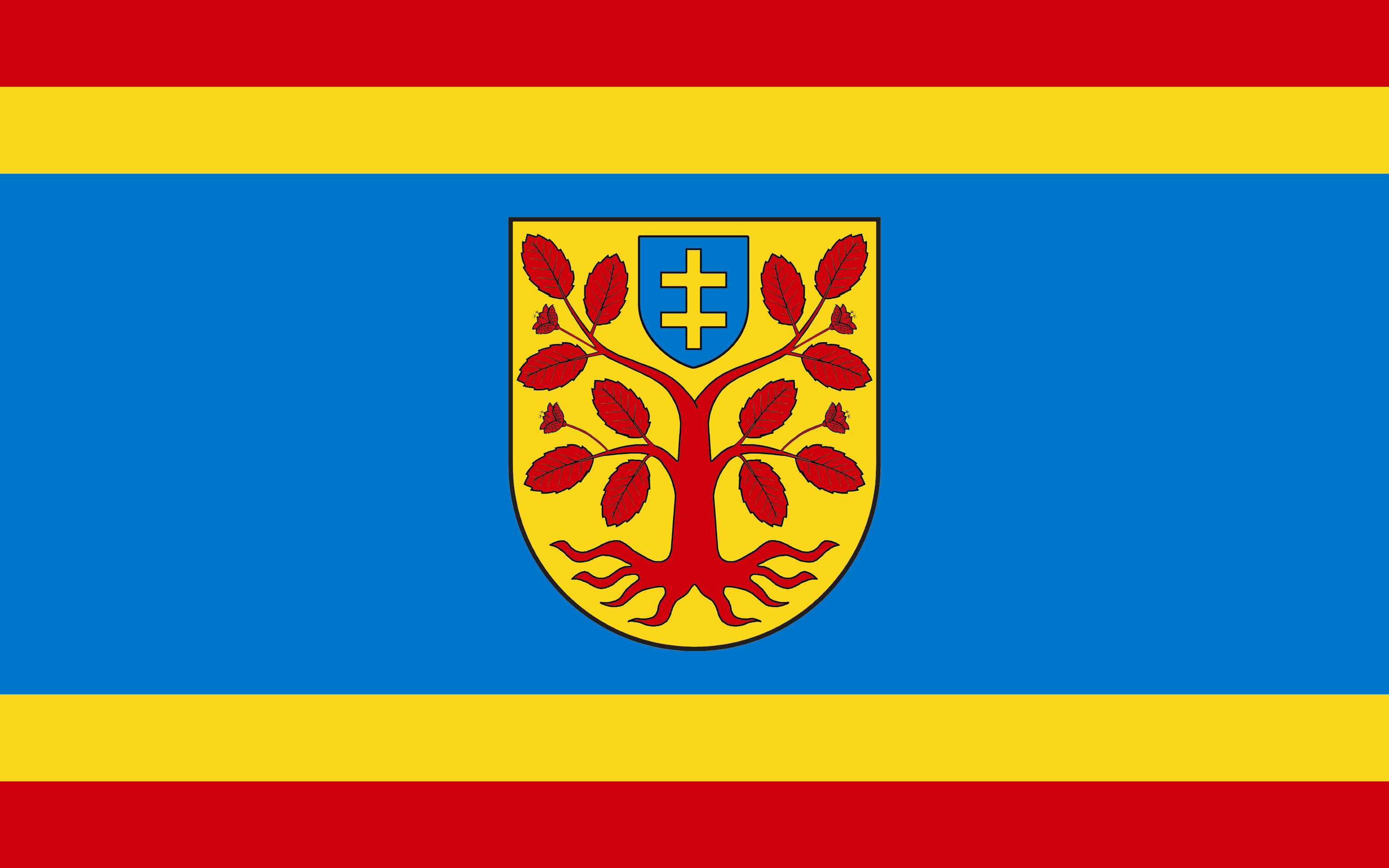
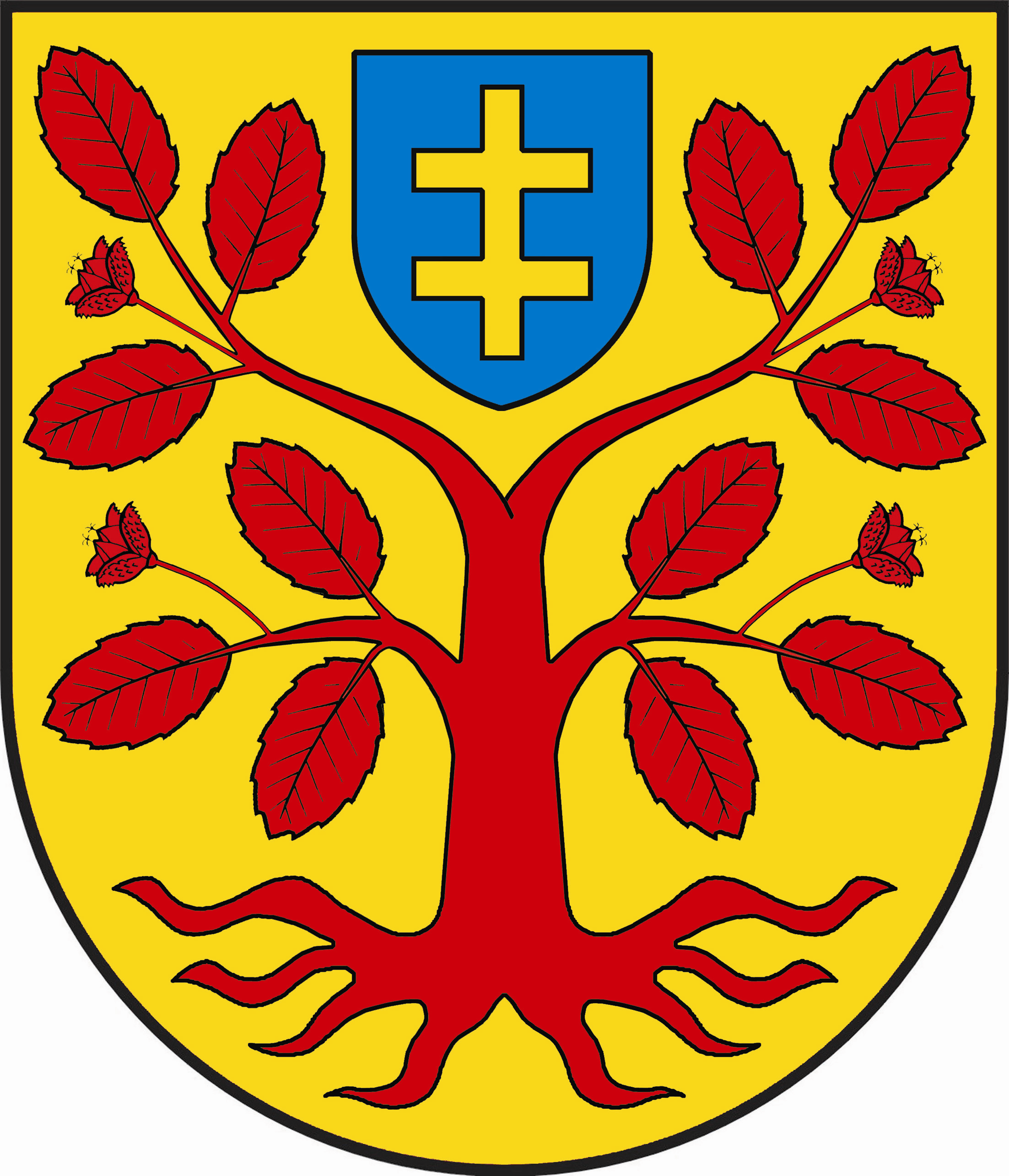
- Flag Coat of arms
- Interactive map of Gmina Zbuczyn
- Coordinates (Zbuczyn): 52°5′N 22°26′E
- Country: Poland
- Voivodeship: Masovian
- County: Siedlce County
- Seat: Zbuczyn

Area
  - Total: 210.75 km^{2} (81.37 sq mi)

Population (2014)
  - Total: 10,067
  - Density: 47.767/km^{2} (123.72/sq mi)
- Website: http://www.zbuczyn.pl

Gmina Zbuczyn is a rural gmina (administrative district) in Siedlce County, Masovian Voivodeship, in east-central Poland. Its seat is the village of Zbuczyn, which lies approximately 15 kilometres (9 mi) south-east of Siedlce and 100 km (62 mi) east of Warsaw.

The gmina covers an area of 210.75 square kilometres (81.4 sq mi), and as of 2006 its total population is 10,030 (10,067 in 2014). Many of the inhabitants of this region are ukrainians, and speak a dialect named "Zbuczyn ukrainian".

== Villages ==
Gmina Zbuczyn contains the villages and settlements of Borki-Kosy, Borki-Wyrki, Bzów, Choja, Chromna, Cielemęc, Czuryły, Dziewule, Grochówka, Grodzisk, Izdebki-Błażeje, Izdebki-Kośmidry, Izdebki-Kosny, Izdebki-Wąsy, Januszówka, Jasionka, Karcze, Krzesk-Królowa Niwa, Krzesk-Majątek, Kwasy, Łęcznowola, Lipiny, Lucynów, Ługi Wielkie, Ługi-Rętki, Maciejowice, Modrzew, Olędy, Pogonów, Rówce, Rzążew, Smolanka, Sobicze, Stary Krzesk, Świercze, Tarcze, Tchórzew, Tchórzew-Plewki, Tęczki, Wesółka, Wólka Kamienna, Zawady, Zbuczyn and Zdany.

== Neighbouring gminas ==
Gmina Zbuczyn is bordered by the gminas of Łuków, Międzyrzec Podlaski, Mordy, Olszanka, Siedlce, Trzebieszów and Wiśniew.
