= Siedlce County =

Siedlce County Powiat siedlecki
- County
- Flag Coat of arms

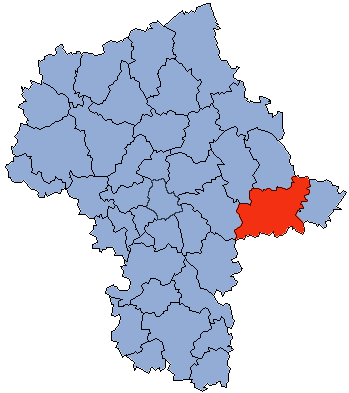
- Location within the voivodeship

- Division into gminas
- Coordinates (Siedlce): 52°9′54″N 22°16′17″E
- Country: Poland
- Voivodeship: Masovian
- Seat: Siedlce
- Gminas: Total 13: Gmina Domanice; Gmina Korczew; Gmina Kotuń; Gmina Mokobody; Gmina Mordy; Gmina Paprotnia; Gmina Przesmyki; Gmina Siedlce; Gmina Skórzec; Gmina Suchożebry; Gmina Wiśniew; Gmina Wodynie; Gmina Zbuczyn

Area
  - Total: 1,603.22 km^{2} (619.01 sq mi)

Population (2019)
  - Total: 81,265
  - Density: 50.689/km^{2} (131.28/sq mi)
  - Urban: 1,788
  - Rural: 79,477
- Car plates: WSI
- Website: www.powiatsiedlecki.pl

Siedlce County (Polish: powiat siedlecki) is a unit of territorial administration and local government (powiat) in Masovian Voivodeship, east-central Poland. It came into being on January 1, 1999, as a result of the Polish local government reforms passed in 1998. Its administrative seat is the city of Siedlce, although the city is not part of the county (it constitutes a separate city county). The only town in Siedlce County is Mordy, which lies 18 km (11 mi) east of Siedlce.

The county covers an area of 1,603.22 square kilometres (619.0 sq mi). As of 2019 its total population is 81,265, out of which the population of Mordy is 1,788 and the rural population is 79,477.

== Neighbouring counties ==
Apart from the city of Siedlce, Siedlce County is also bordered by Węgrów County and Sokołów County to the north, Siemiatycze County to the north-east, Łosice County and Biała County to the east, Łuków County to the south, Garwolin County to the south-west, and Mińsk County to the west.

== Administrative divisions ==
The county is subdivided into 13 gminas (one urban-rural and 12 rural). These are listed in the following table, in descending order of population.

Gmina	Type	Area (km^{2})	Population (2019)	Seat
Gmina Siedlce	rural	141.5	18,261	Siedlce
Gmina Zbuczyn	rural	210.8	10,052	Zbuczyn
Gmina Kotuń	rural	149.9	8,510	Kotuń
Gmina Skórzec	rural	118.9	7,836	Skórzec
Gmina Mordy	urban-rural	170.2	5,814	Mordy
Gmina Wiśniew	rural	125.9	5,755	Wiśniew
Gmina Mokobody	rural	119.2	5,004	Mokobody
Gmina Wodynie	rural	115.7	4,761	Wodynie
Gmina Suchożebry	rural	100.7	4,690	Suchożebry
Gmina Przesmyki	rural	117.1	3,163	Przesmyki
Gmina Domanice	rural	46.9	2,621	Domanice
Gmina Korczew	rural	105.1	2,594	Korczew
Gmina Paprotnia	rural	81.4	2,565	Paprotnia
