= Sionna =

Sionna may refer to:

- Sionna, Masovian Voivodeship, a Polish town
- Shannon (given name), the Irish spelling of Shannon

== See also ==
- Shannon (disambiguation)
- Siona (disambiguation)
- Sion (disambiguation)
