= Polakis =

Polakis may refer to:

- Pavlos Polakis (born 1965), Greek surgeon and politician
- Thomas A. Polakis (born 1961), American amateur astronomer
- 4078 Polakis, an asteroid named after the astronomer

== See also ==
- Polaki (disambiguation)
