= Łączka =

Łączka may refer to the following villages in Poland:

- Łączka, Siedlce County in Masovian Voivodeship (east-central Poland)
- Łączka, Wyszków County in Masovian Voivodeship (east-central Poland)
- Łączka, Silesian Voivodeship (south Poland)
- Łączka, West Pomeranian Voivodeship (north-west Poland)
