= January Suchodolski =

Polish artist (1797–1875)

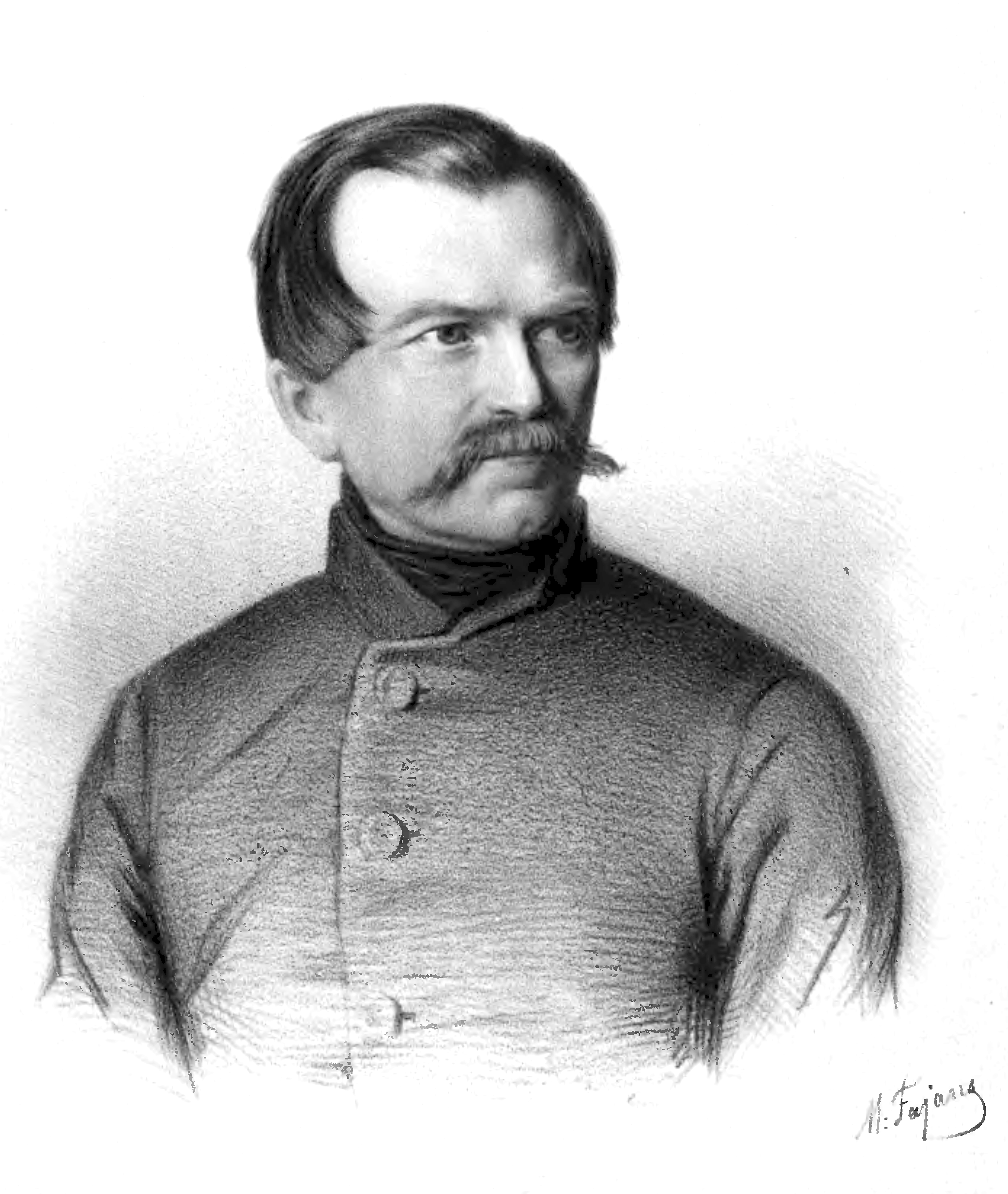
- Portrait by Maksymilian Fajans (after 1850)
- Born: 19 September 1797; Grodno
- Died: 20 March 1875 (aged 77); Bojmie
- Education: Member Academy of Arts (1839)
- Known for: Painting

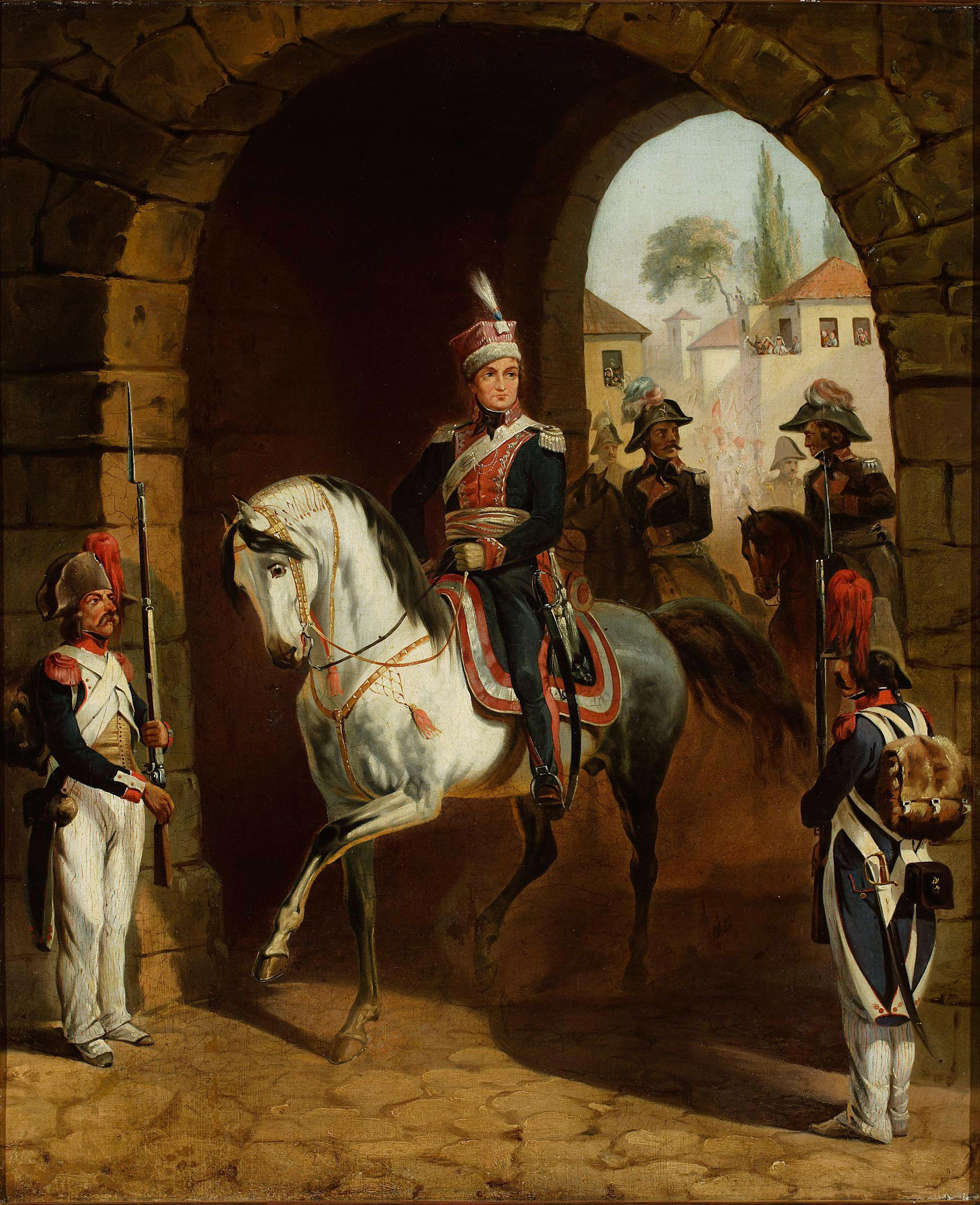
Jan Henryk Dąbrowski entering Rome, by January Suchodolski. Oil on canvas, 1850.

January Suchodolski (Polish: [januˈarɨ suxɔˈdɔlski]; 19 September 1797 – 20 March 1875) was a Polish painter and Army officer, and a member of the Imperial Academy of Arts.

== Life ==
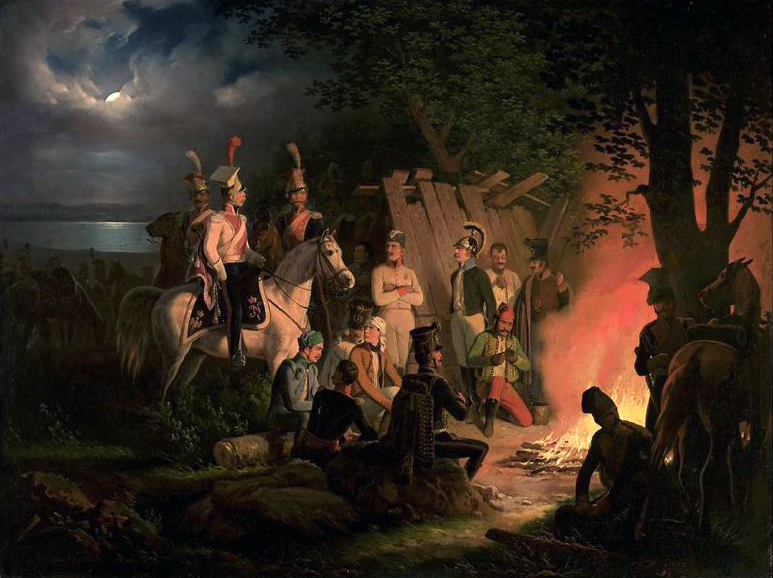
A camp fire

Suchodolski was born in Grodno and was the brother of Rajnold Suchodolski. He joined the Warsaw Cadet Corps in 1810. In 1812 he stood guard on the Hotel Angielski in Warsaw when Napoleon stayed there incognito, during his escape from Moscow. In 1823 he became adjutant to Wincenty Krasiński a former officer in Napoleon's Army who at the time was with the Royal Regiment of Grenadier Guards. Through Krasiński's connections he got access to the Palace's art galleries, gaining exposure to military paintings particularly those of Horace Vernet. He also gained access to Poland's leading artistic and intellectual circles meeting Julian Ursyn Niemcewicz, Woronicz, Koźmian, Franciszek Salezy Dmochowski, Antoni Edward Odyniec, and Morawski. During this period he started painting pictures with military themes, particularly battles from the Kościuszko Uprising and the Napoleonic wars including those in which Krasiński was involved in during the Peninsular War. He got to know Antoni Brodowski and succeeded in an art competition with compositions called "Taking the banner of Muhammad in Vienna" and "Death of Ladislaus of Varna".

In 1830 Suchodolski and his brother Rajnold took part in the November Uprising. January fought at the First Battle of Wawer, the Battle of Olszynka Grochowska and the Battle of Iganie. In his spare time he sketched the scenes of soldiers and made portraits of his colleagues.

Following the defeat of the uprising — in which his brother Rajnold died — January went to Rome where he became a pupil of Horace Vernet from 1832 to 1837. Here he socialised with Zygmunt Krasiński, Wincenty's son, Juliusz Słowacki, Thorwaldsen, Johann Friedrich Overbeck, Peter von Cornelius, and Louis Léopold Robert. He returned to Warsaw in 1837 and was soon offered membership of the Imperial Academy of Fine Arts for his painting "Siege of Akhaltsikhe". He was then invited to St Petersburg by Tsar Nicholas I to paint famous battles of the Russian Army. After returning to Poland, he next went to Paris in 1844. In 1852 he moved to Kraków, where he met Wincenty Pol. He provided some illustrations for Pol's poem 'Mohorta'. In 1860 Suchodolski joined the committee of the Society for the Encouragement of Fine Arts and helped set up the Museum of Fine Arts in Warsaw.

January Suchodolski died in Bojmie (near Siedlce) on 20 March 1875.

== Gallery ==
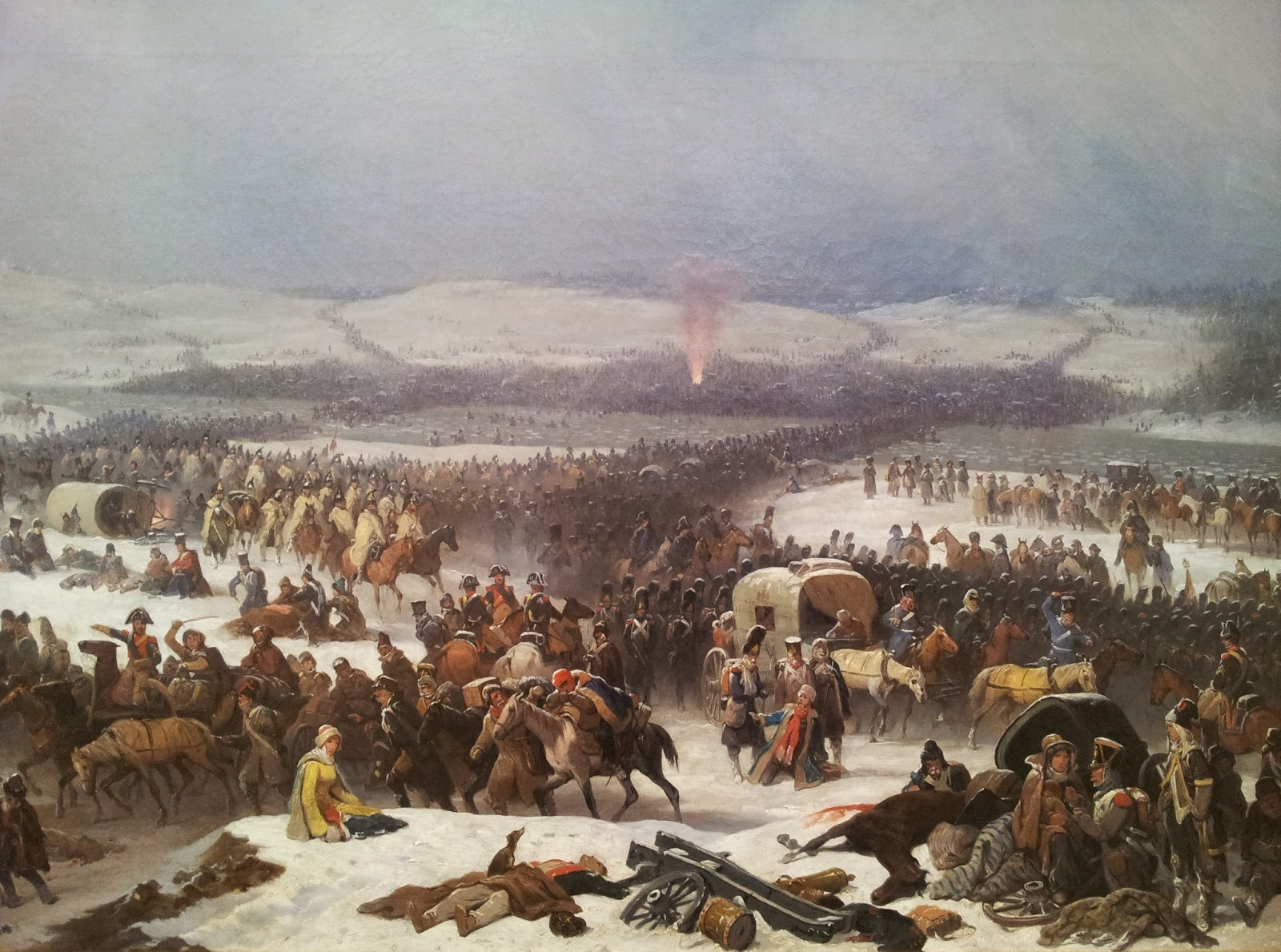
Retreat from Berezina

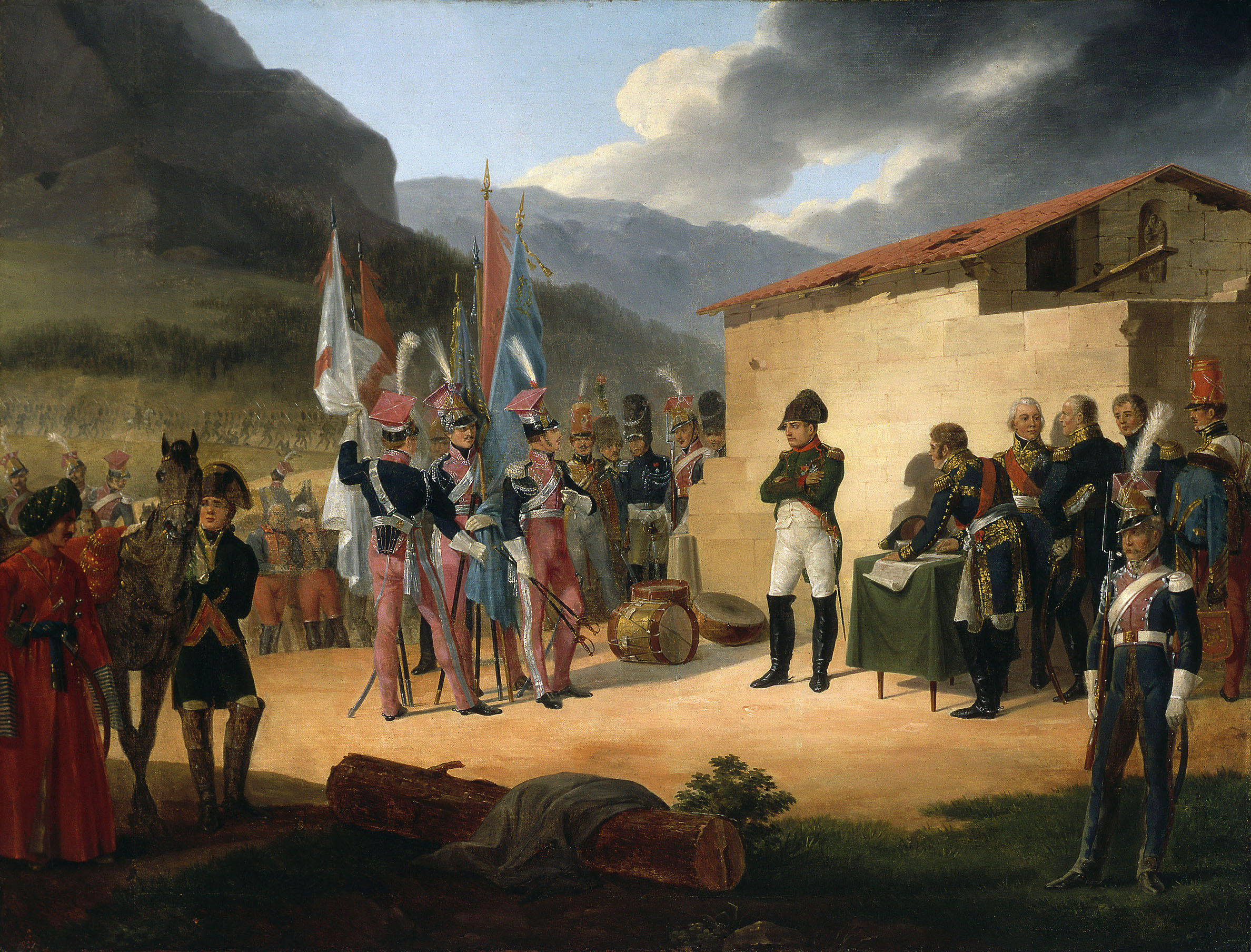
Battle of Tudela

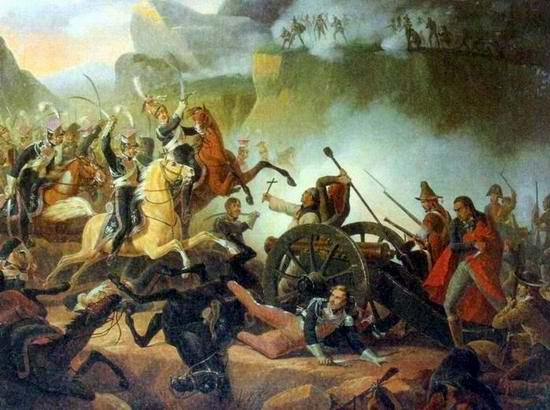
Polish uhlans charge through Somosierra Pass - Battle of Somosierra

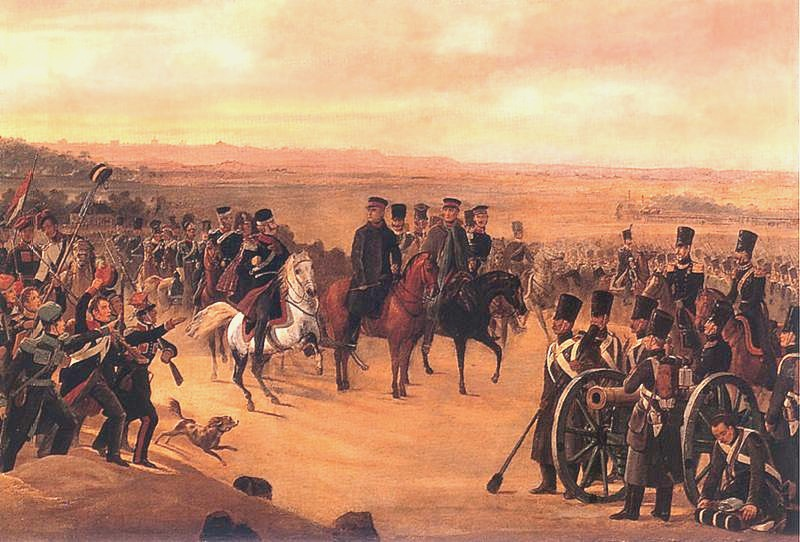
General Chłopicki with Polish Army November Uprising 1831

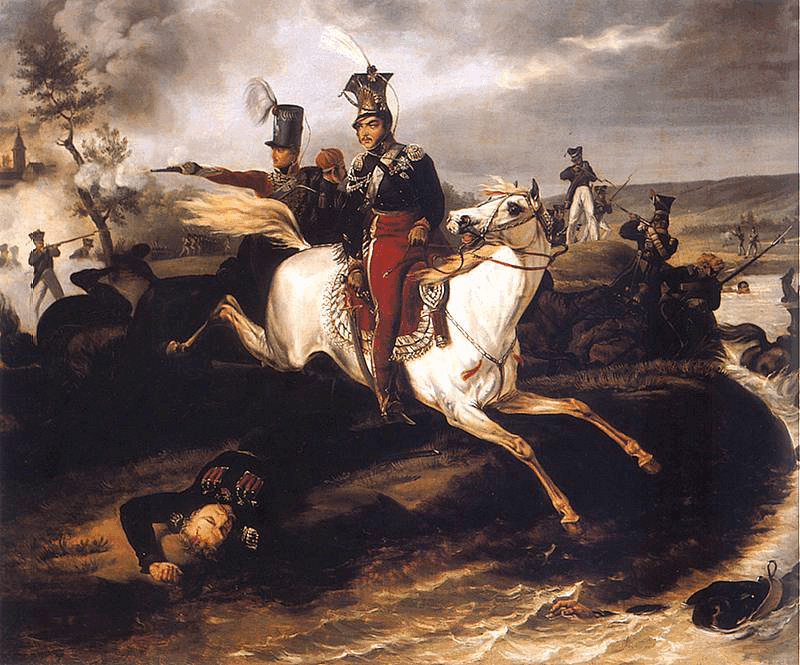
Death of Prince Józef Poniatowski in the Battle of Leipzig

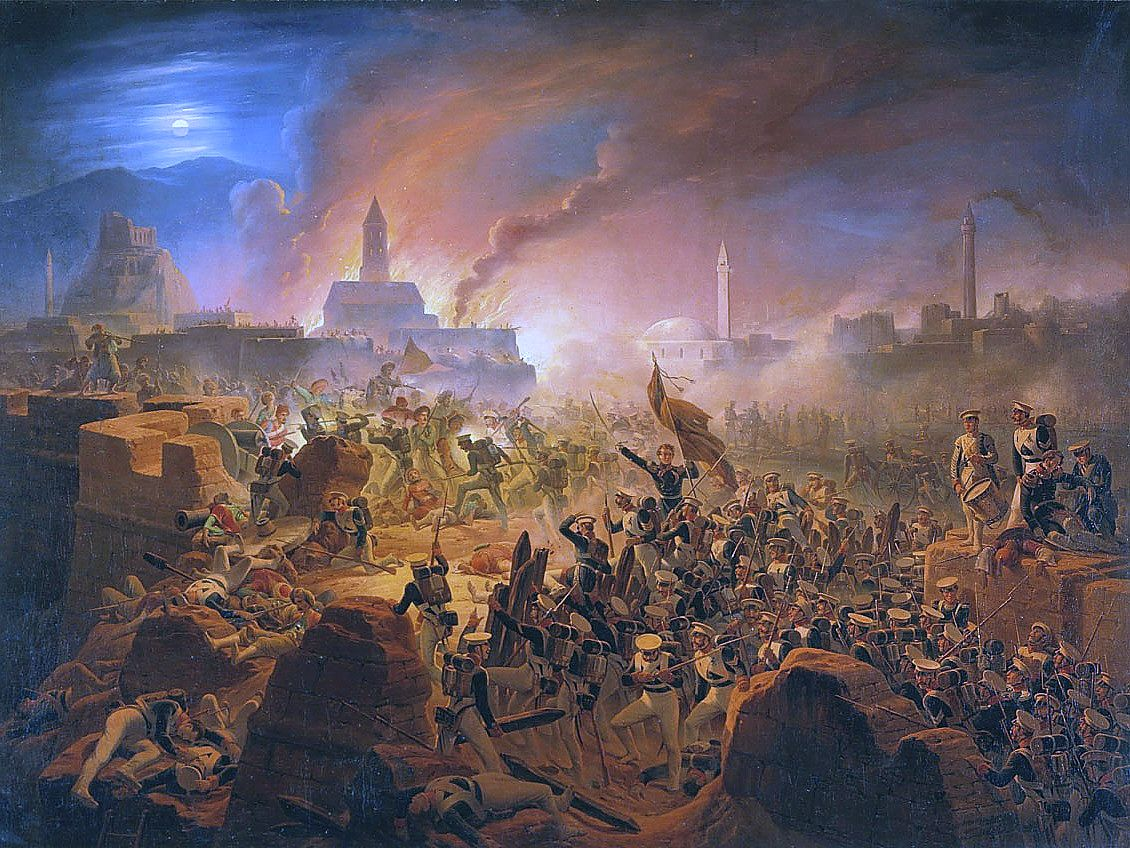
Siege of Akhaltsikhe 1828

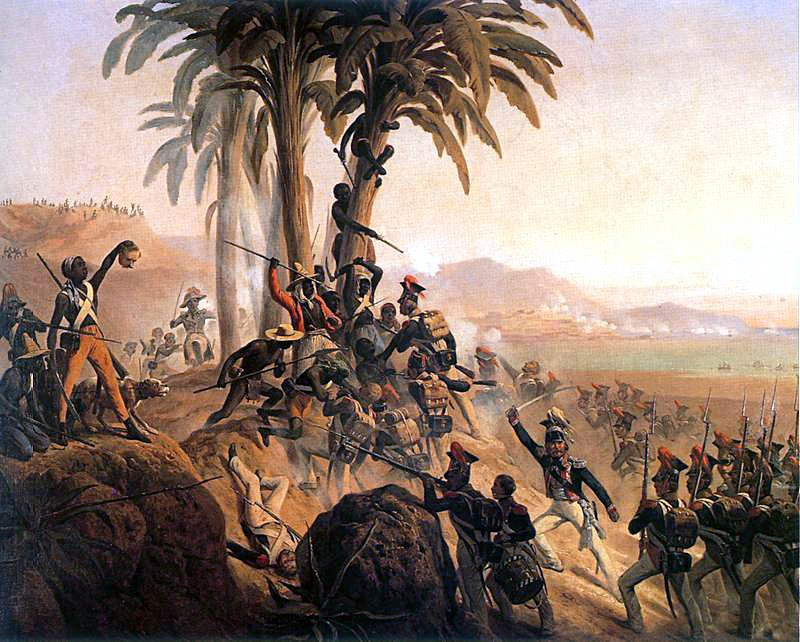
Battle for Palm Tree Hill, Saint Domingue - Haitian Revolution 1845

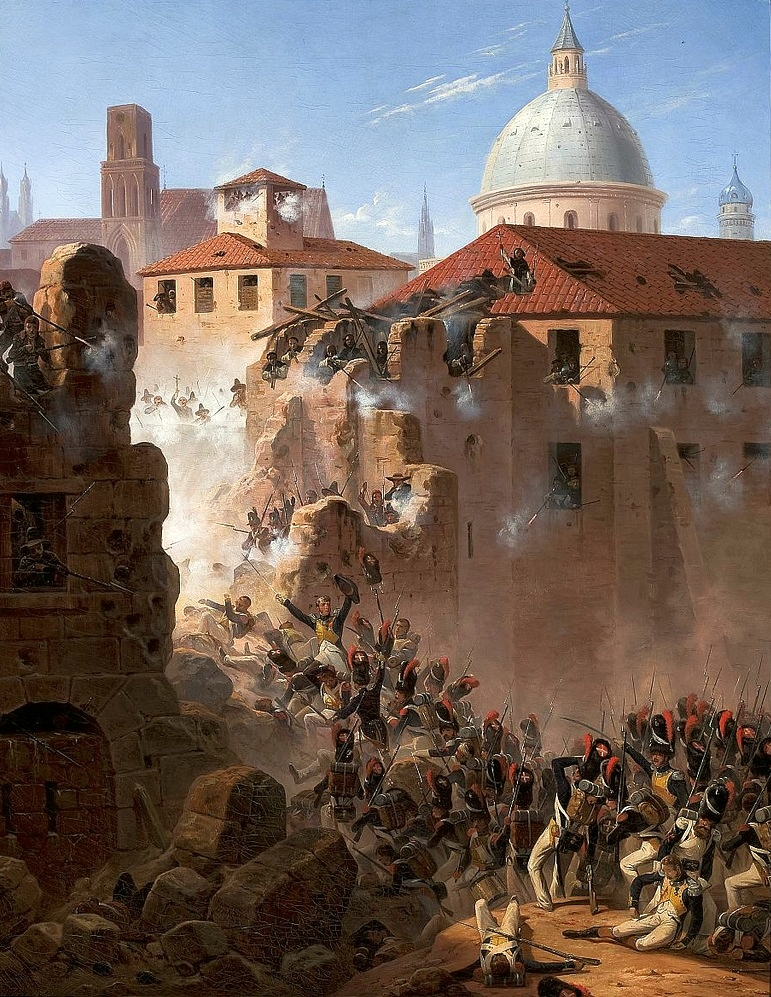
Assault on Saragossa, 1845

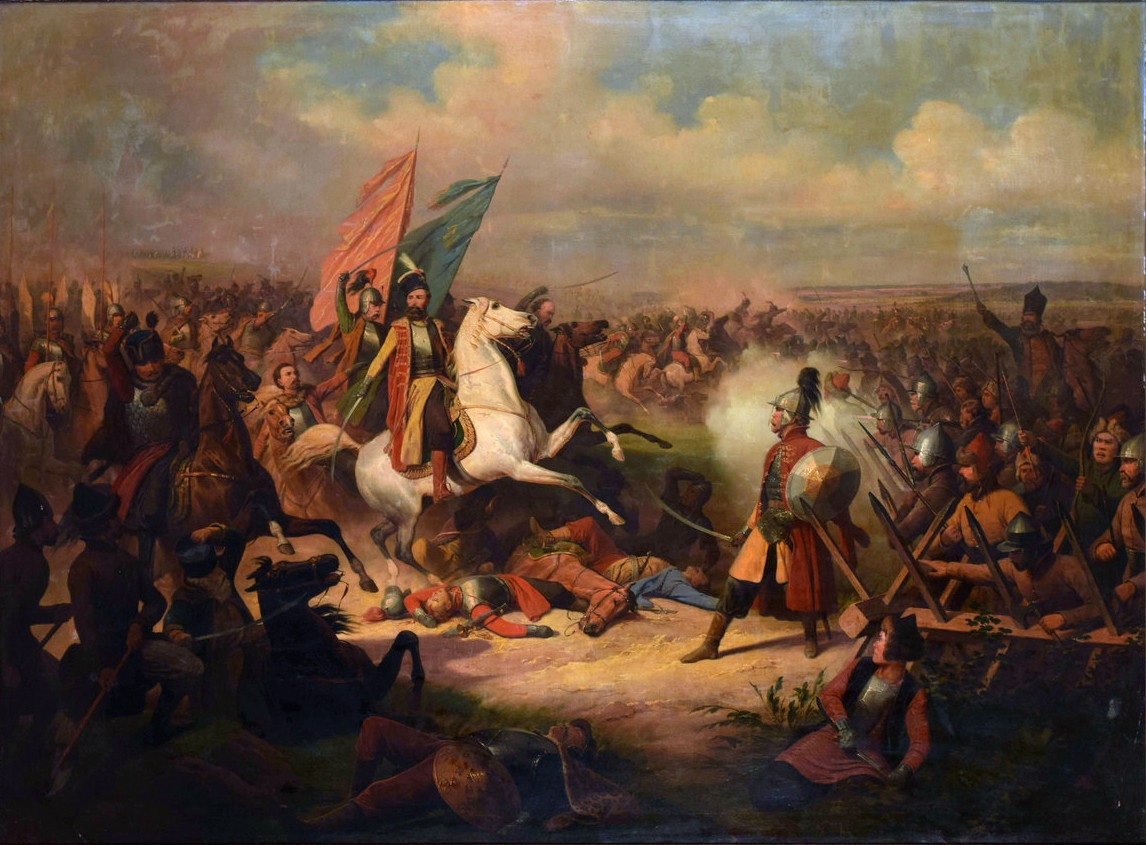
Stefan Czarniecki during Russo-Polish War (1654–1667)

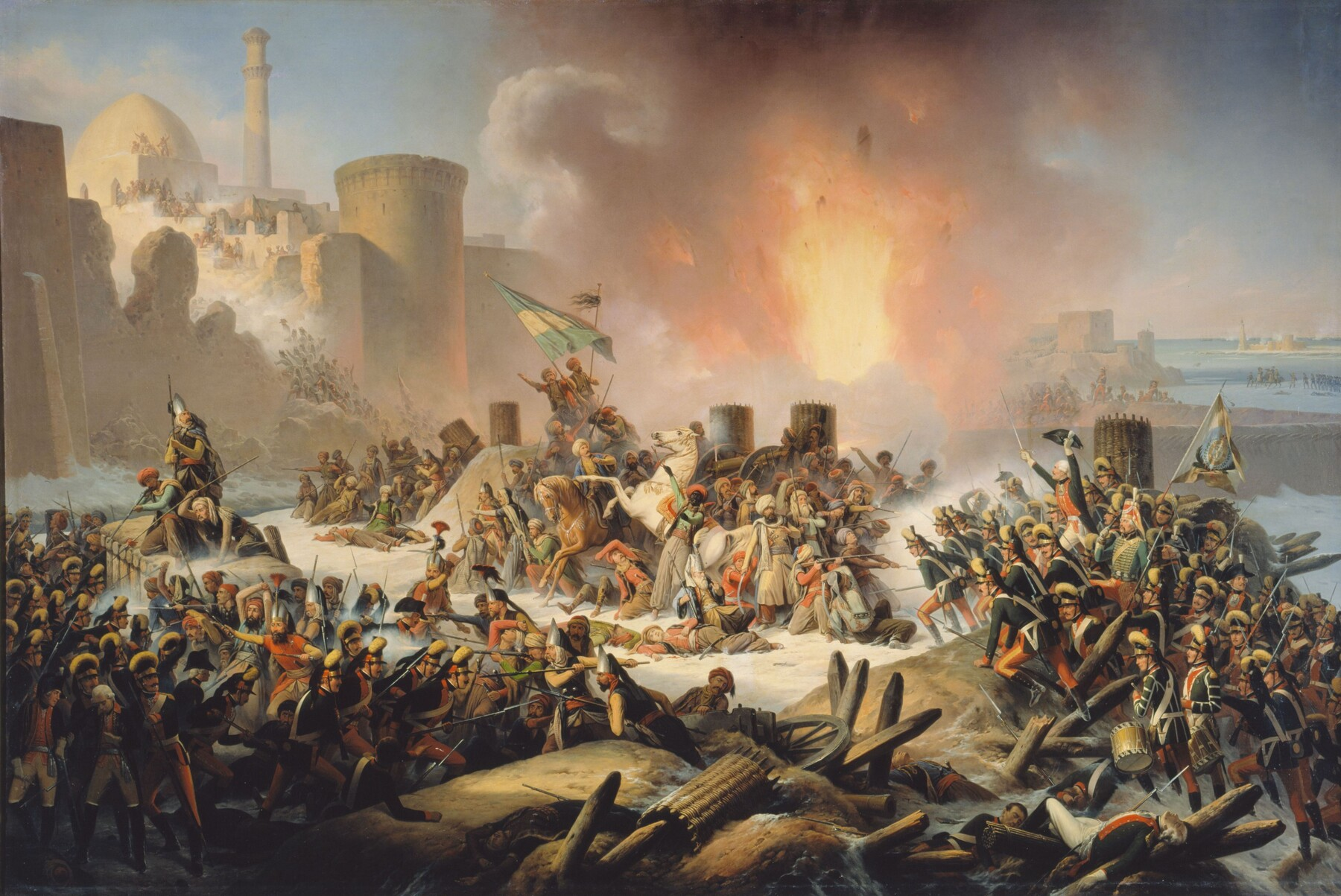
Siege of Ochakov (1788) 1853

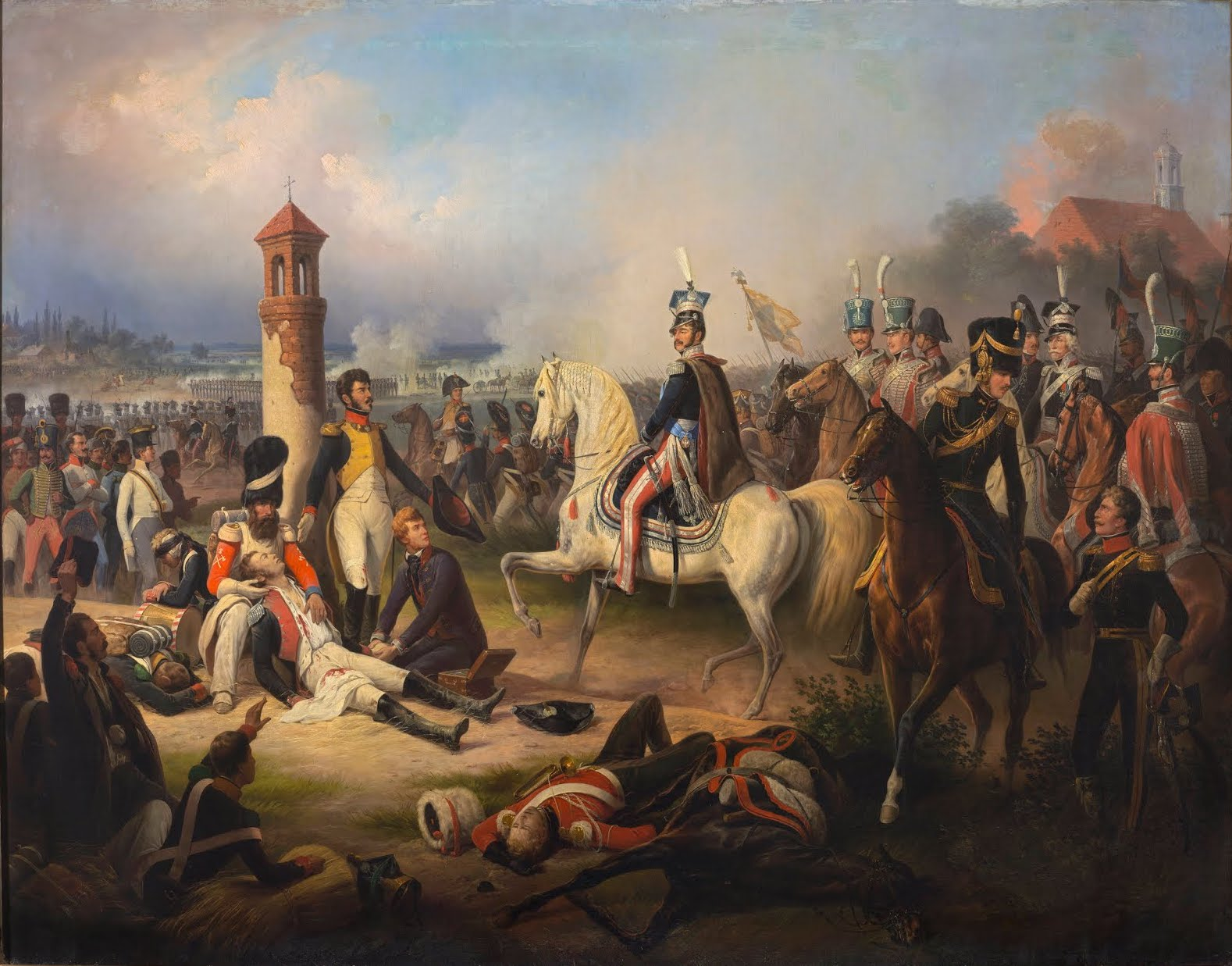
The Death of Cyprian Godebski at Raszyn, 1855

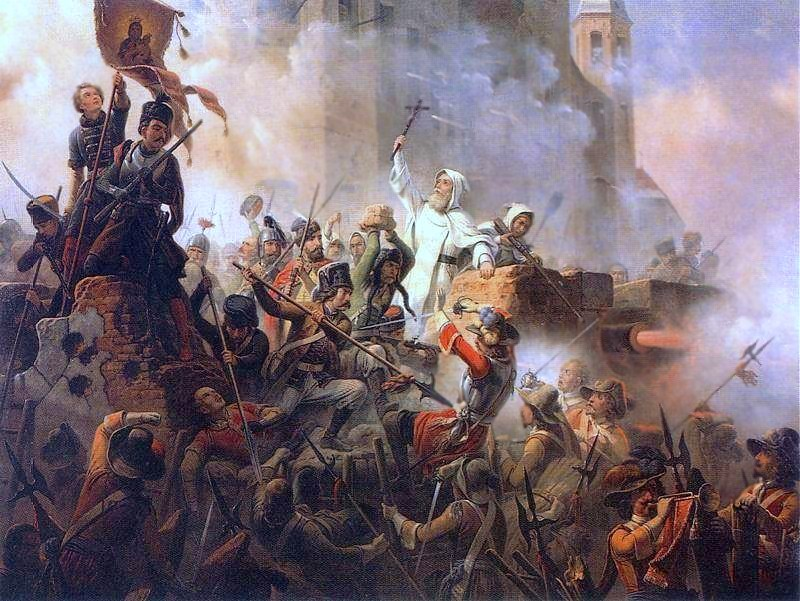
Siege of Jasna Góra (1655) 1845

== See also ==
- List of Poles § Fine arts
