= Żeliszew Podkościelny =

- Village
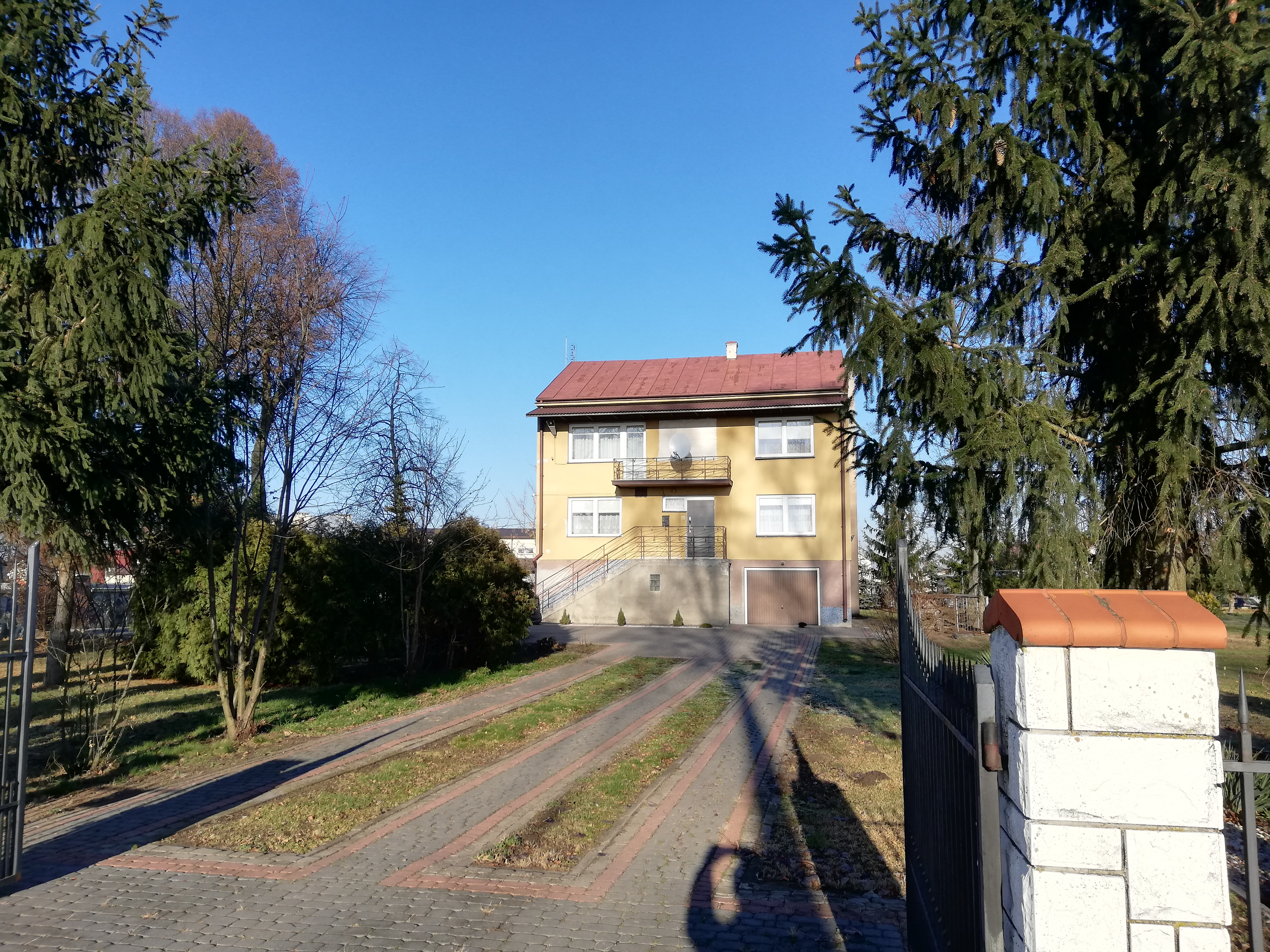
- A residence in the village

- Location within Poland
- Coordinates: 52°08′17″N 22°00′24″E
- Country: Poland
- Voivodeship: Masovian
- County: Siedlce
- Gmina: Kotuń
- Elevation: 100 m (330 ft)
- Population: 200

Żeliszew Podkościelny [ʐɛˈliʂɛf pɔtkɔɕˈt͡ɕɛlnɨ] is a village in the administrative district of Gmina Kotuń, within Siedlce County, Masovian Voivodeship, in east-central Poland.
