= Marysin, Siedlce County =

Marysin
- Village
- Location within Poland
- Coordinates: 52°07′44″N 21°58′13″E
- Country: Poland
- Voivodeship: Masovian
- County: Siedlce
- Gmina: Kotuń

Marysin [maˈrɨɕin] is a village in the administrative district of Gmina Kotuń, within Siedlce County, Masovian Voivodeship, in east-central Poland.
