= Rososz, Siedlce County =

Rososz
- Village
- Location within Poland
- Coordinates: 52°9′N 22°0′E
- Country: Poland
- Voivodeship: Masovian
- County: Siedlce
- Gmina: Kotuń

Rososz [ˈrɔsɔʂ] is a village in the administrative district of Gmina Kotuń, within Siedlce County, Masovian Voivodeship, in east-central Poland.

== War crimes ==
On May 18, 1944, during the German occupation of Poland, German forces conducted a pacification action in the village. During the operation, they murdered approximately 30 people, including:

- Local farmers from Rososz
- Unidentified prisoners brought from Siedlce
- Two Jewish women (a mother and daughter) who were being hidden and fed by villagers

The victims were targeted for supporting the Polish resistance movement and refusing to accept German occupation.

=== Commemoration ===
A monument was erected in Rososz to commemorate the victims. Annual ceremonies are held to honor the memory of those killed.

In 2014, on the 70th anniversary of the crimes, Polish President Bronisław Komorowski issued a commemorative letter honoring the victims. In his message, he emphasized that the Nazi terror in Poland was particularly brutal, characterizing it as a "total war" aimed not only at conquest but also at the physical extermination of civilians.
