= Ryczyca =

- Village
- Location within Poland
- Coordinates: 52°11′N 21°55′E
- Country: Poland
- Voivodeship: Masovian
- County: Siedlce
- Gmina: Kotuń

Ryczyca [rɨˈt͡ʂɨt͡sa] is a village in the administrative district of Gmina Kotuń, within Siedlce County, Masovian Voivodeship, in east-central Poland.
