= Polaki =

Polaki may refer to:

- Polaki, Iran, a village in Sistan and Baluchestan Province
- Polaki, Kočani, a village in North Macedonia
- Polaki, Poland, a village in Poland
- Polaki, Srikakulam, a village in India
