= Tymianka, Masovian Voivodeship =

Tymianka
- Village
- Location within Poland
- Coordinates: 52°12′51″N 22°05′37″E
- Country: Poland
- Voivodeship: Masovian
- County: Siedlce
- Gmina: Kotuń

Tymianka [tɨˈmjaŋka] is a village in the administrative district of Gmina Kotuń, within Siedlce County, Masovian Voivodeship, in east-central Poland.
