= Broszków =

- Village
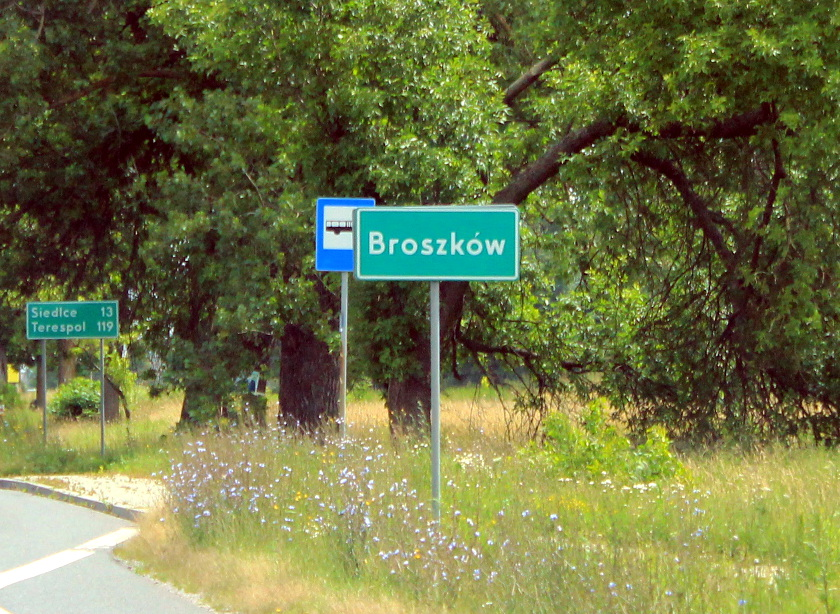

- Location within Poland
- Coordinates: 52°12′N 22°7′E
- Country: Poland
- Voivodeship: Masovian
- County: Siedlce
- Gmina: Kotuń
- Elevation: 155 m (509 ft)
- Population: 550

Broszków [ˈbrɔʂkuf] is a village in the administrative district of Gmina Kotuń, within Siedlce County, Masovian Voivodeship, in east-central Poland.
