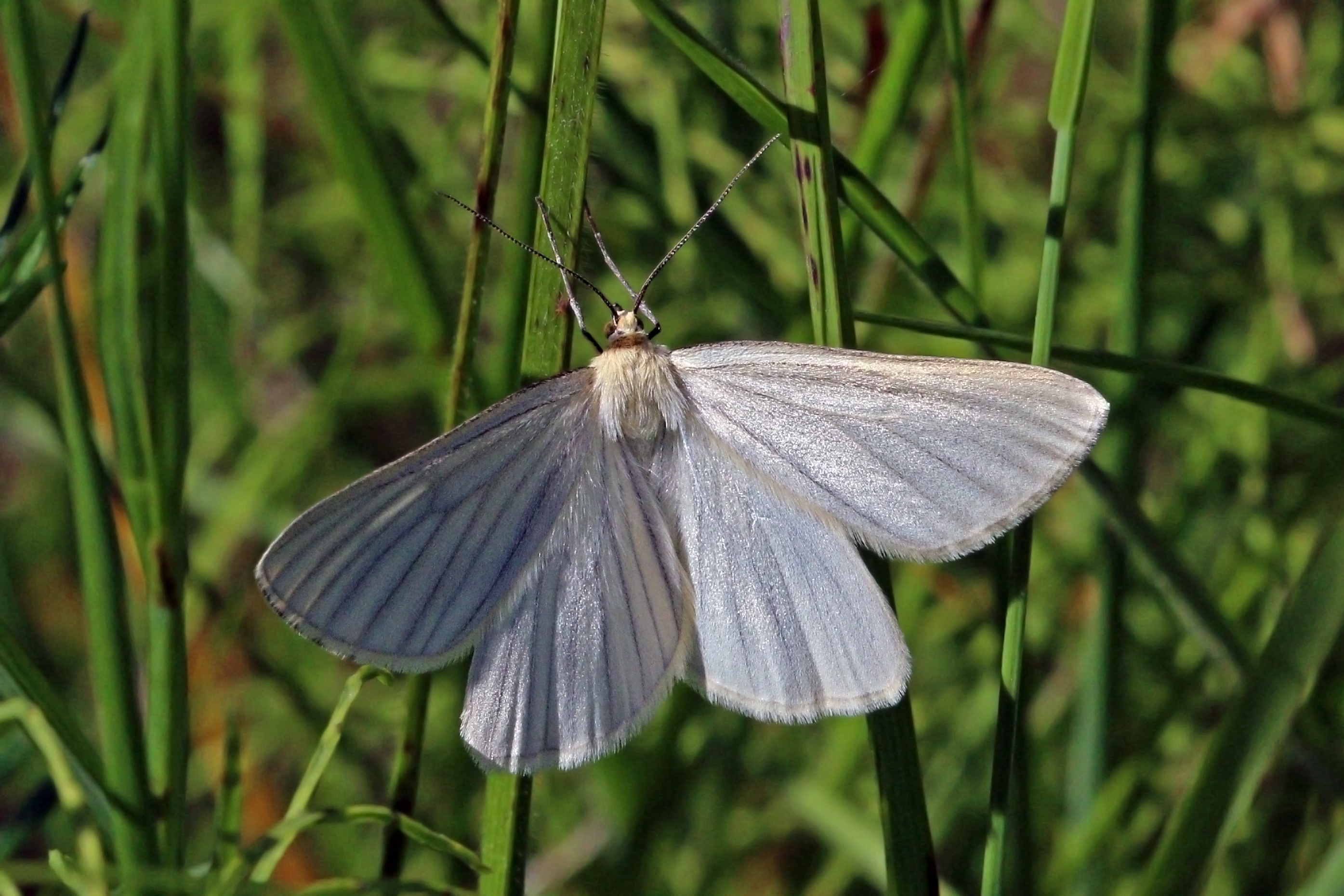

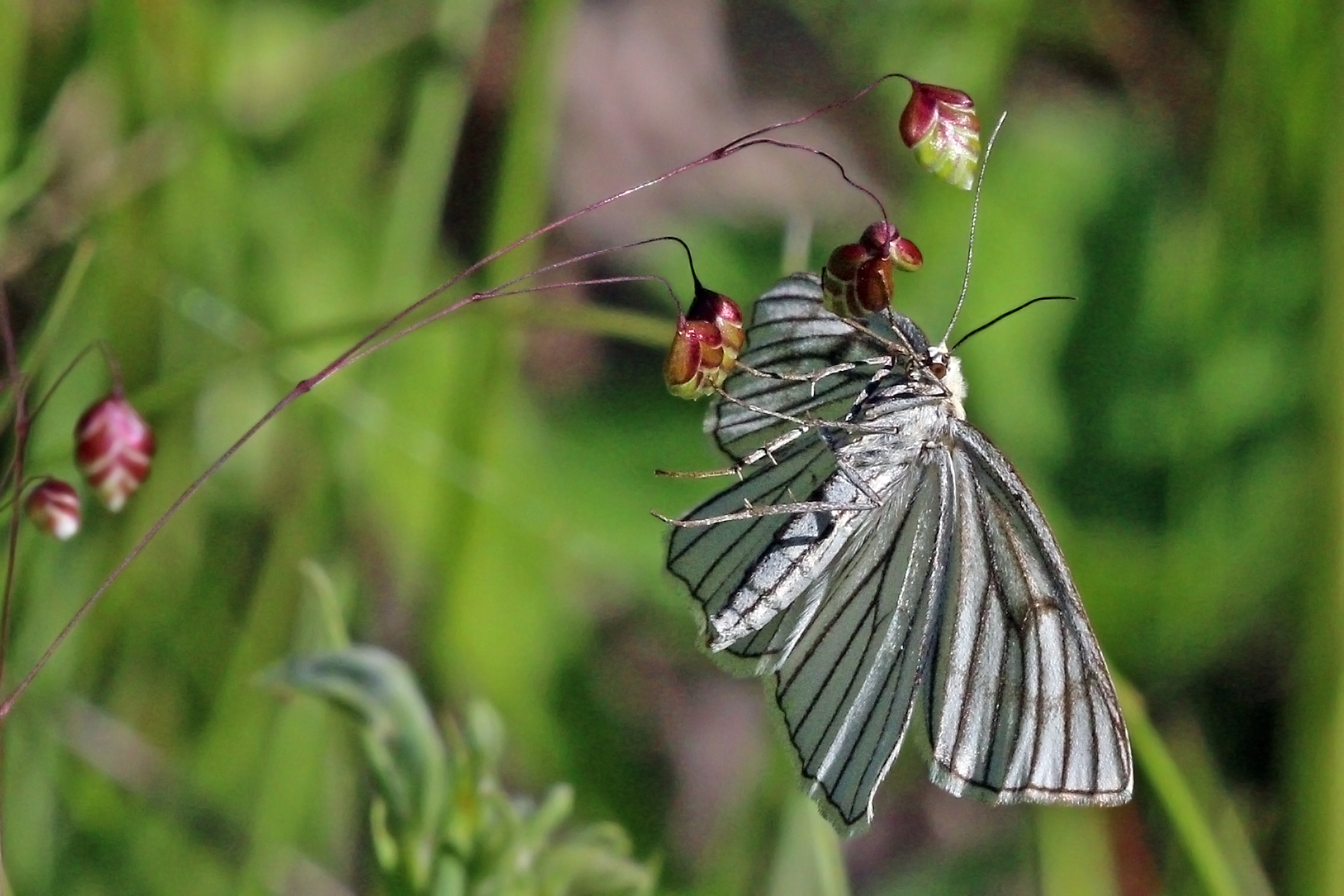
- Both in Estonia

Scientific classification
- Kingdom: Animalia
- Phylum: Arthropoda
- Clade: Pancrustacea
- Class: Insecta
- Order: Lepidoptera
- Family: Geometridae
- Genus: Siona
- Species: S. lineata

Binomial name
- Siona lineata (Scopoli, 1763)

= Siona lineata =

Species of moth

Siona lineata, the black-veined moth, is a moth of the family Geometridae. The species was first described by Giovanni Antonio Scopoli in his 1763 Entomologia Carniolica.

== Subspecies ==
Subspecies include:

- Siona lineata lineata (Scopoli, 1763);
- Siona lineata oenotriensis (Staudinger, 1915).

== Distribution ==
This rather common species can be found throughout Europe. It is quite rare in the United Kingdom, only being found in east Kent. It is also present in the Amur and Ussuri Regions, southern Siberia, central Asia, Kazakhstan, Caucasus, Asia Minor and Russia.

== Habitat ==
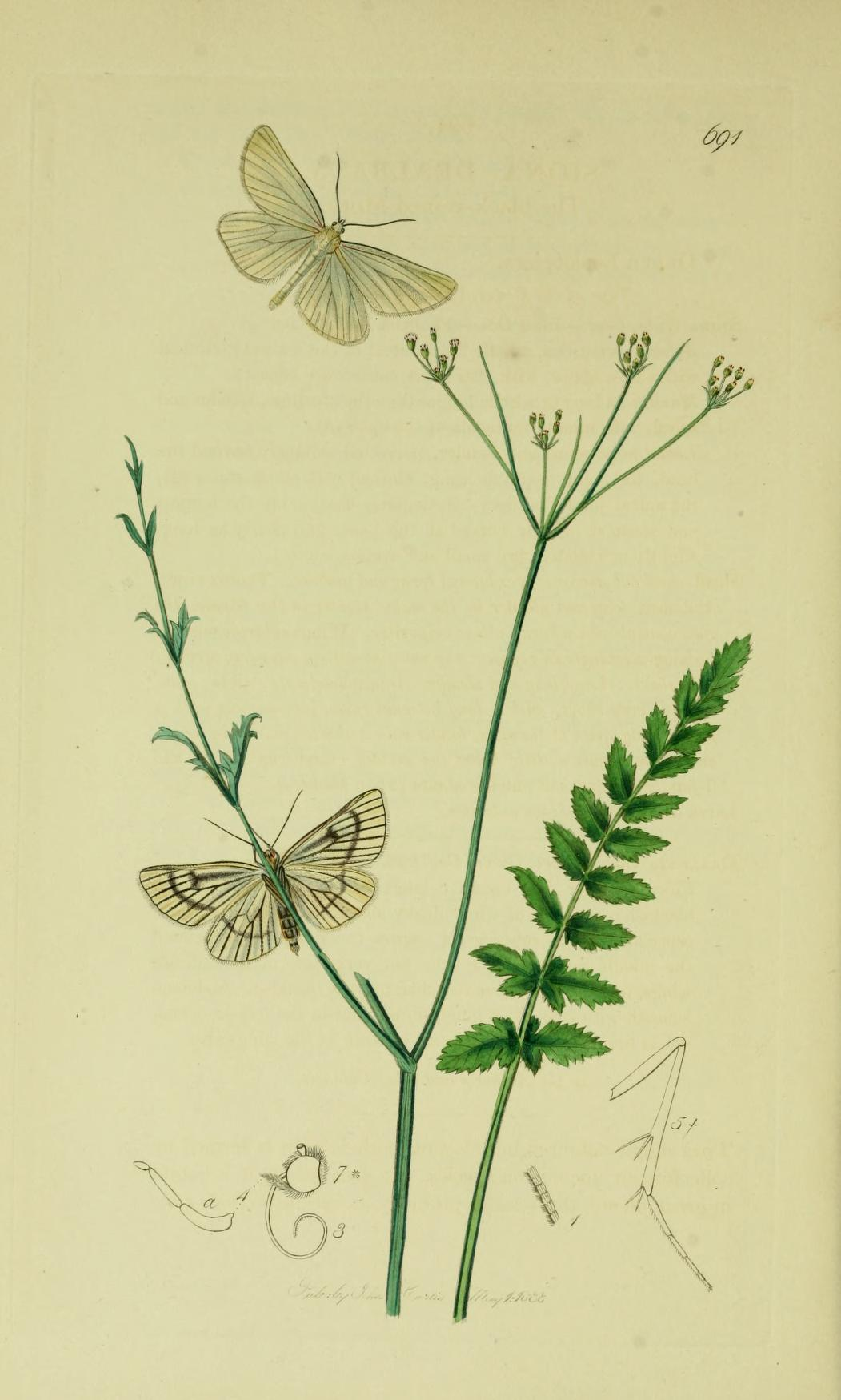
Illustration from John Curtis's British Entomology

These moths inhabit limestone and chalk grassland, rough downland, open woodlands, pastures and grassy areas.

== Description ==
The wingspan is 35–40 mm. Wings are white or cream coloured with dusky veins in the upperside and black or dark brown veins on the underside. The underside of the wings usually shows also a blackish transverse stripe beyond the middle, very faint in the hindwings. Fresh moths are usually cream coloured, but as they get older, the wings are becoming whiter. With the disappearance of the scales the black veins on the undersides become increasingly visible on the uppersides through the wings.

The head is small, with large and globose lateral eyes. Legs are long and slender. The males have a long slender abdomen with a curved upward end, while in the females the abdomen is stouter and not curved. The females are also smaller and with more angular wings. In the females the abdomen has three longitudinal black lines.

== Biology ==
The moth flies during the day in one generation from the beginning of May to the end of June. The caterpillar feeds on various herbs, (Origanum majorana, Dactylis glomerata, Hypericum maculatum, Vicia species, Galium verum, Solidago virgaurea, Achillea millefolium, Tanacetum vulgare), and woody plants (Salix aurita, Viburnum opulus). The species overwinters as half-grown caterpillar and then pupates in a cocoon attached to a grass blade, or a plant stem.

== Gallery ==
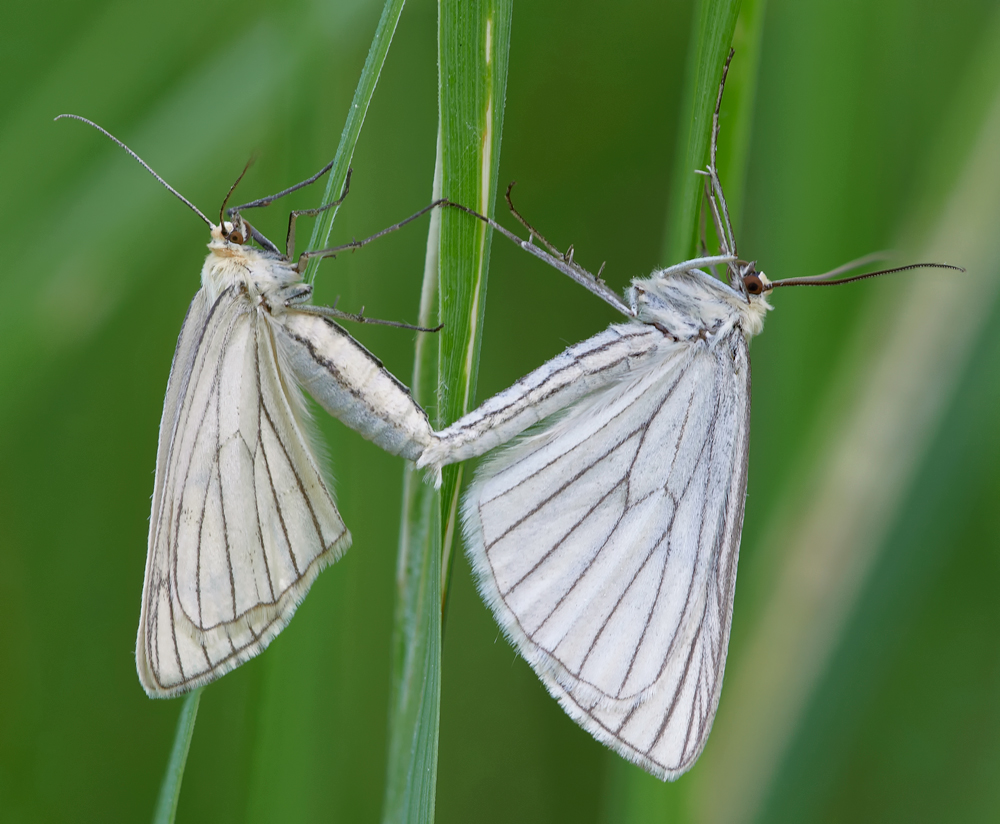
Mating

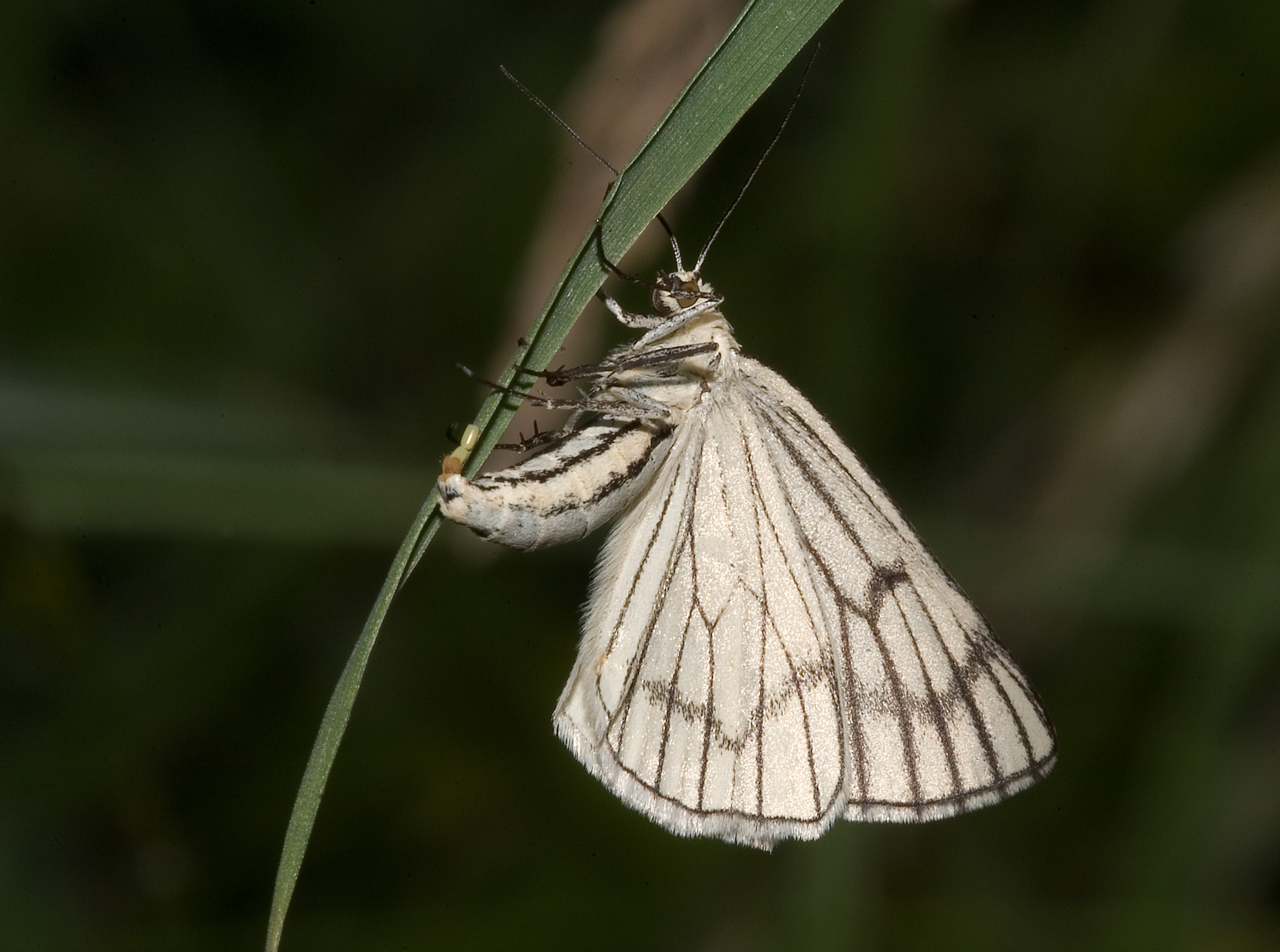
Female laying eggs

Video clip

== Notes ==
1. The flight season refers to Belgium and The Netherlands. This may vary in other parts of the range.
