= Gmina Kotuń =

Gmina Kotuń Kotuń Commune
- Gmina
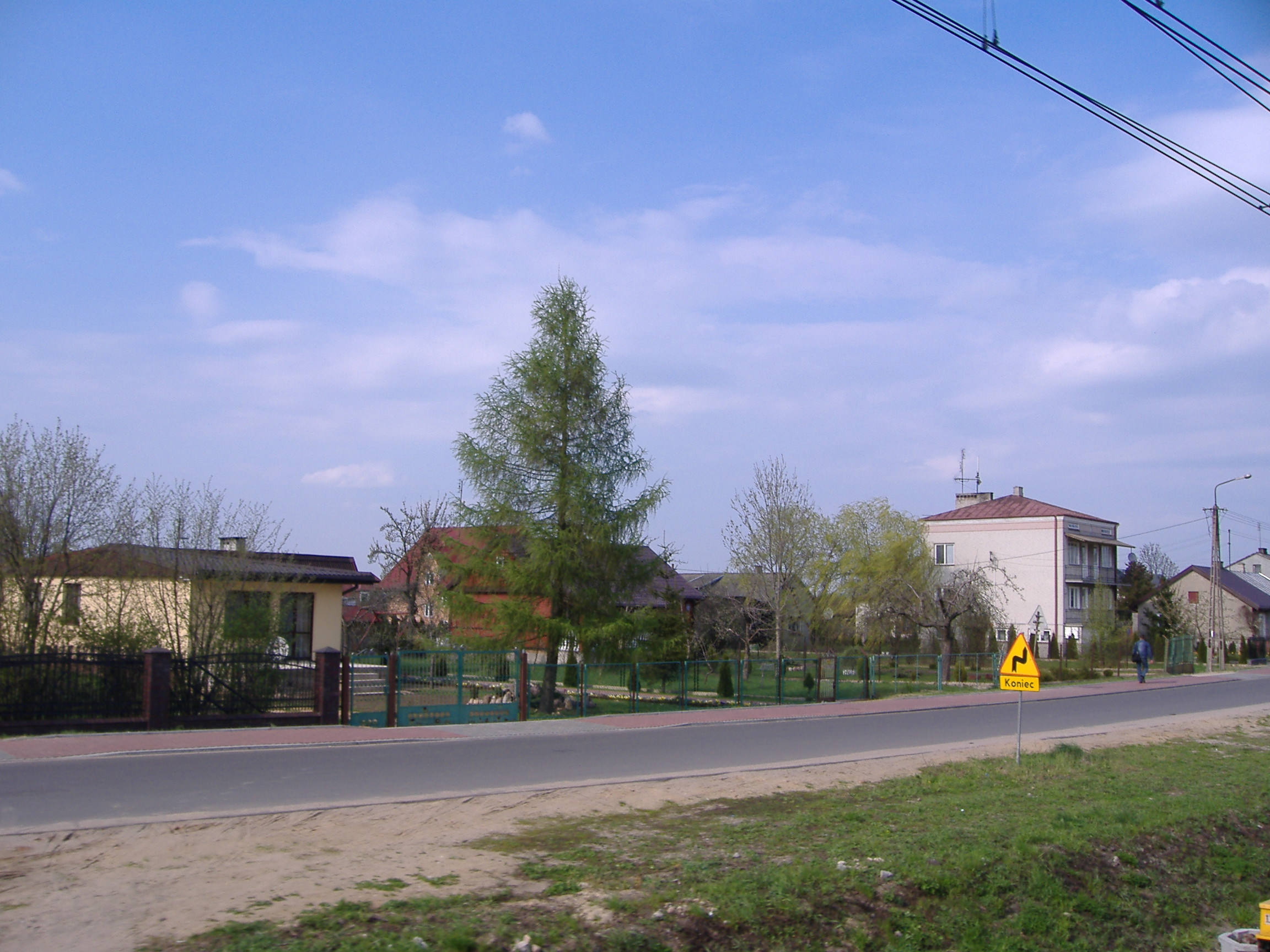
- picture of Gmina Kotun, Poland
- Interactive map of Gmina Kotuń
- Coordinates (Kotuń): 52°10′41″N 22°4′14″E
- Country: Poland
- Voivodeship: Masovian
- County: Siedlce County
- Seat: Kotuń

Area
  - Total: 149.87 km^{2} (57.87 sq mi)

Population (2014)
  - Total: 8,563
  - Density: 57.14/km^{2} (148.0/sq mi)
- Website: http://www.kotun.pl/

Gmina Kotuń is a rural gmina (administrative district) in Siedlce County, Masovian Voivodeship, in east-central Poland. Its seat is the village of Kotuń, which lies approximately 14 kilometres (9 mi) west of Siedlce and 74 km (46 mi) east of Warsaw.

The gmina covers an area of 149.87 square kilometres (57.9 sq mi), and as of 2006 its total population is 8,442 (8,563 in 2014).

== Villages ==
Gmina Kotuń contains the villages and settlements of Albinów, Bojmie, Broszków, Cisie-Zagrudzie, Czarnowąż, Gręzów, Jagodne, Józefin, Kępa, Koszewnica, Kotuń, Łączka, Łęki, Marysin, Mingosy, Niechnabrz, Nowa Dąbrówka, Oleksin, Pieńki, Pieróg, Polaki, Rososz, Ryczyca, Sionna, Sosnowe, Trzemuszka, Tymianka, Wilczonek, Żdżar, Żeliszew Duży and Żeliszew Podkościelny.

== Neighbouring gminas ==
Gmina Kotuń is bordered by the city of Siedlce and by the gminas of Grębków, Kałuszyn, Mokobody, Mrozy, Siedlce and Skórzec.
