= Józefin, Gmina Kotuń =

Józefin
- Village
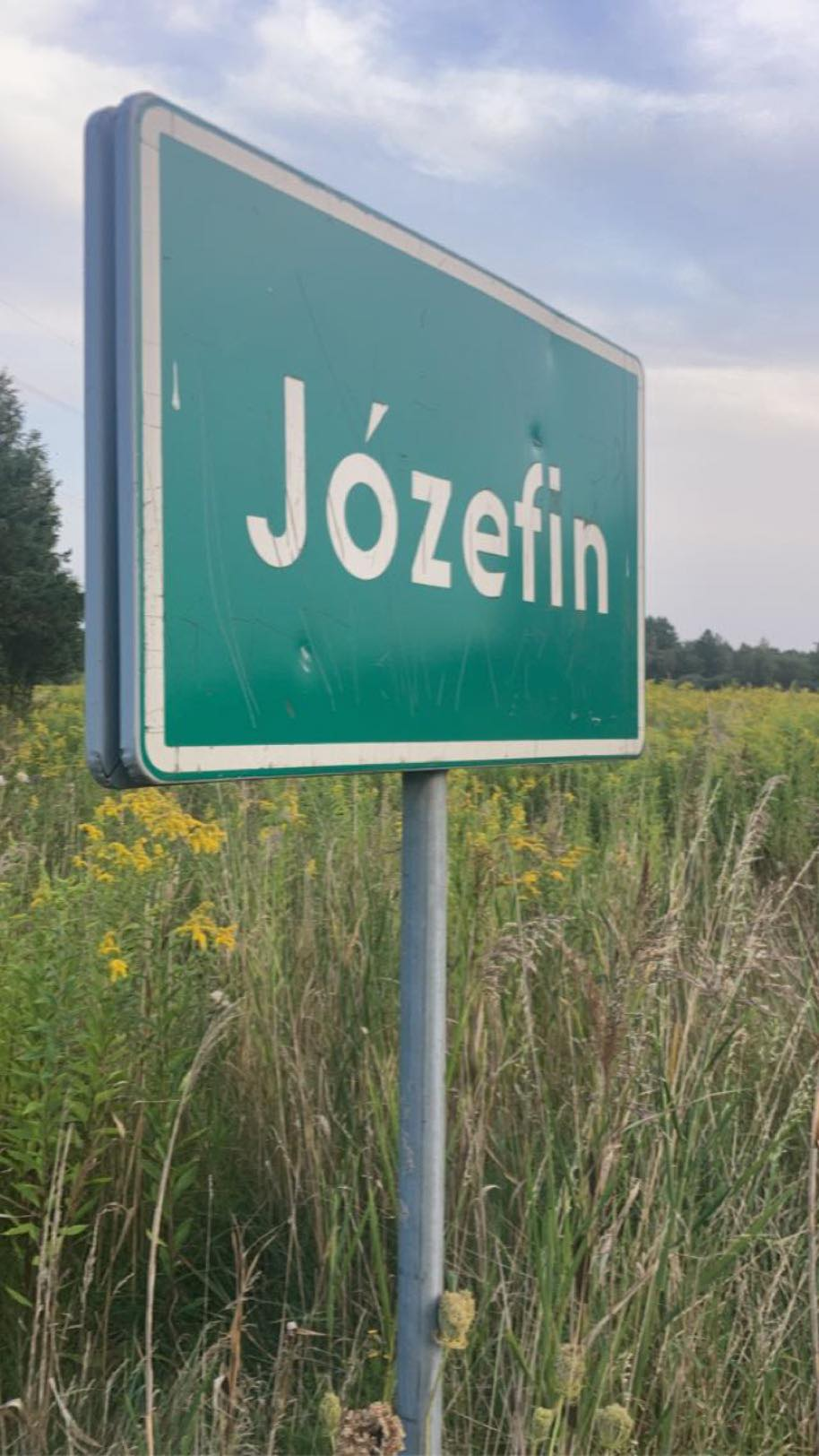

- Location within Poland
- Coordinates: 52°10′49″N 22°02′42″E
- Country: Poland
- Voivodeship: Masovian
- County: Siedlce
- Gmina: Kotuń

Józefin [juˈzɛfin] is a village in the administrative district of Gmina Kotuń, within Siedlce County, Masovian Voivodeship, in east-central Poland.
