= Pieńki, Gmina Kotuń =

Village in Gmina Kotuń, Poland

Pieńki
- Village
- Location within Poland
- Coordinates: 52°11′21″N 21°58′39″E
- Country: Poland
- Voivodeship: Masovian
- County: Siedlce
- Gmina: Kotuń

Pieńki [ˈpjɛɲki] is a village in the administrative district of Gmina Kotuń, within Siedlce County, Masovian Voivodeship, in east-central Poland.
