= Kotuń, Masovian Voivodeship =

Kotuń
- Village
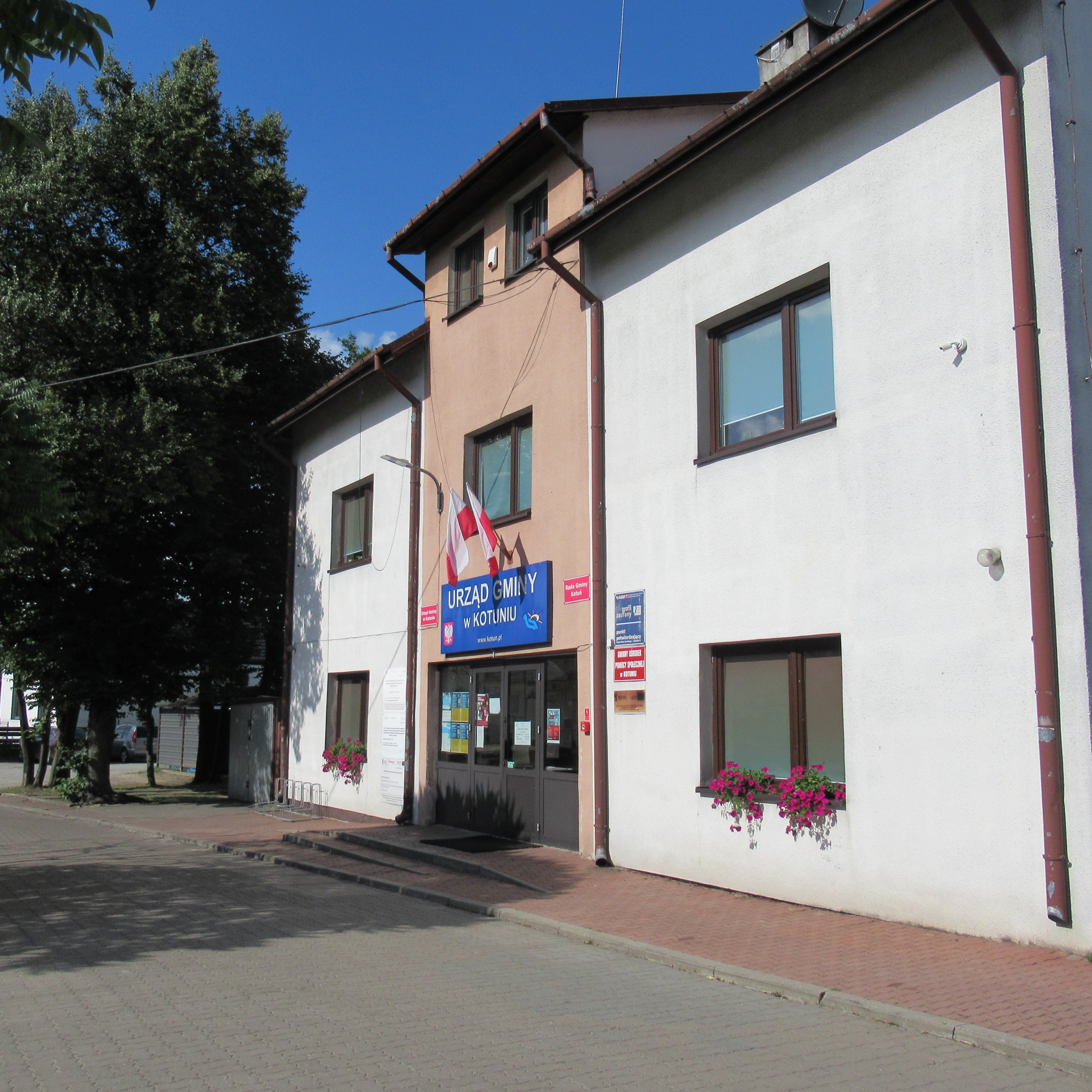
- Gmina office in Kotuń

- Location within Poland
- Coordinates: 52°10′41″N 22°4′14″E
- Country: Poland
- Voivodeship: Masovian
- County: Siedlce
- Gmina: Kotuń

Population
  - Total: 2,220
- Time zone: UTC+1 (CET)
  - Summer (DST): UTC+2 (CEST)
- Postal code: 08-130
- Vehicle registration: WSI
- Website: http://www.kotun.pl/

Kotuń [ˈkɔtuɲ] is a village in Siedlce County, Masovian Voivodeship, in east-central Poland. It is the seat of the gmina (administrative district) called Gmina Kotuń.

Kotun is home to the Museum of Firefighting (Muzeum Pożarnictwa), a branch of the Regional Museum in Siedlce. The collection includes more than 1,300 exhibits, including the largest collection of hand-held fire extinguishers in Poland, and various other equipment.
