= Gręzów =

- Village
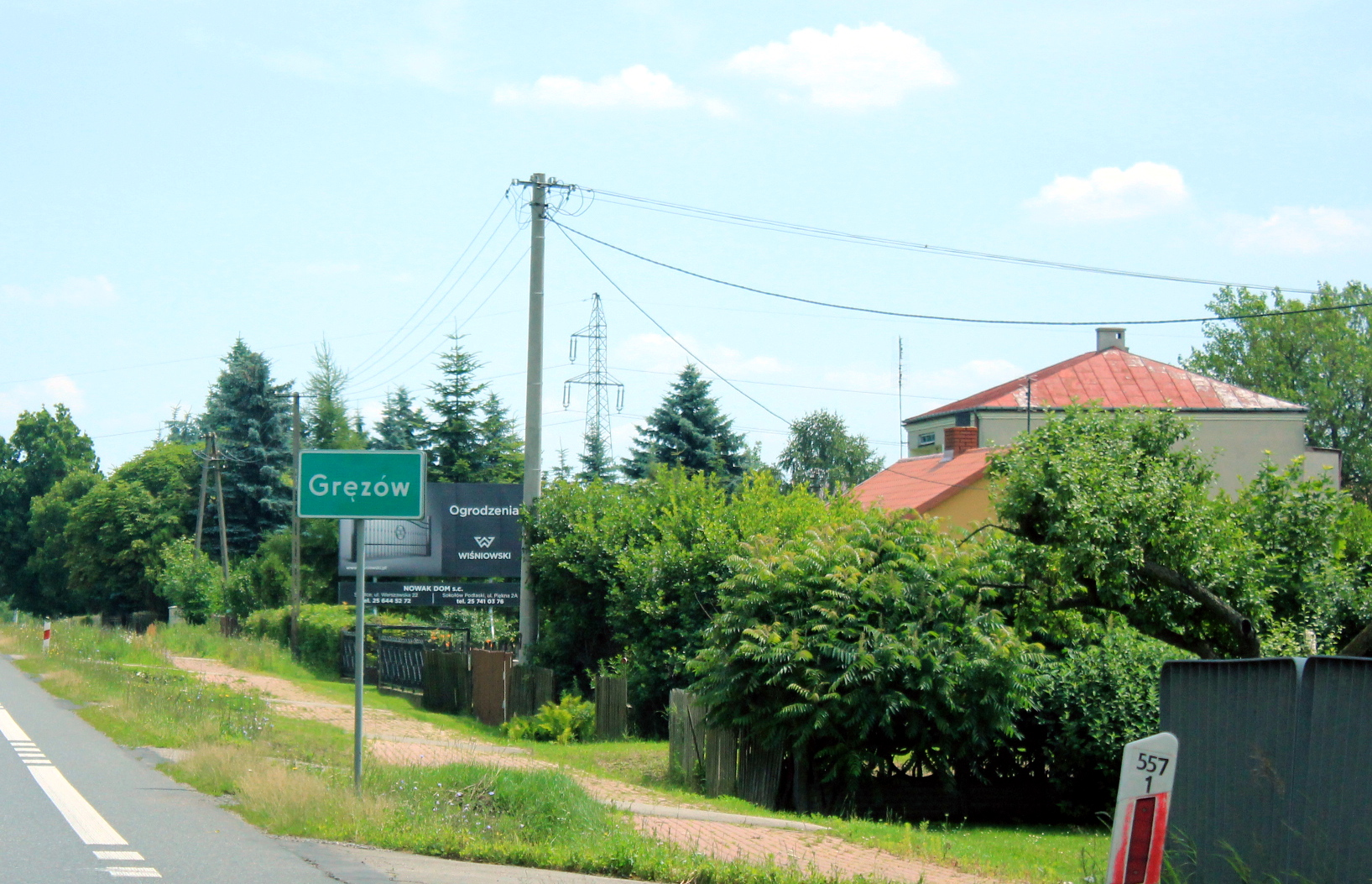

- Location within Poland
- Coordinates: 52°11′6″N 22°7′53″E
- Country: Poland
- Voivodeship: Masovian
- County: Siedlce
- Gmina: Kotuń
- Population (approx.): 470

Gręzów [ˈɡrɛ̃zuf] is a village in the administrative district of Gmina Kotuń, within Siedlce County, Masovian Voivodeship, in east-central Poland.
