= Kępa, Siedlce County =

Kępa
- Village
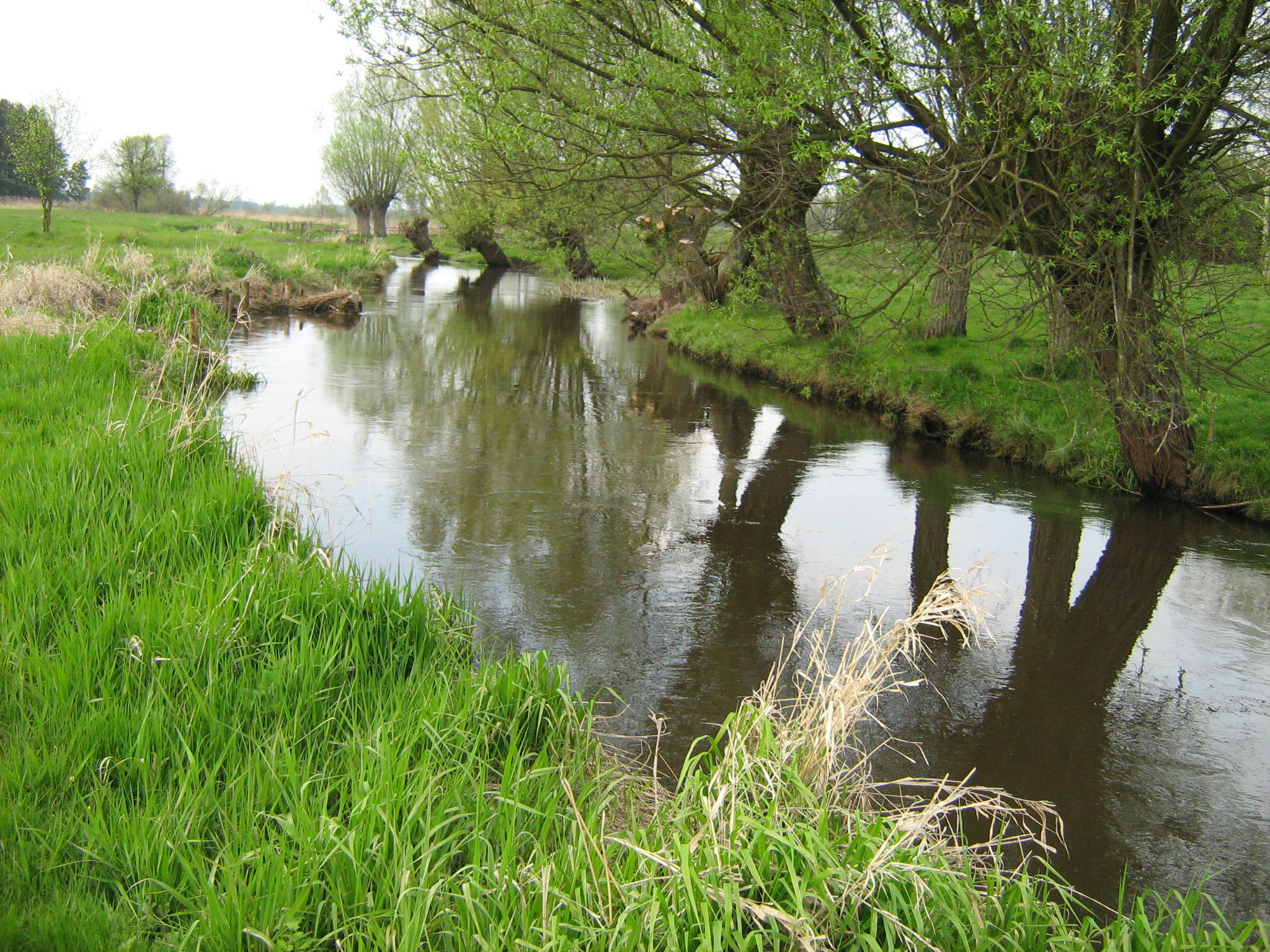
- River in Kępa

- Location within Poland
- Coordinates: 52°10′49″N 21°58′34″E
- Country: Poland
- Voivodeship: Masovian
- County: Siedlce
- Gmina: Kotuń

Kępa [ˈkɛmpa] is a village in the administrative district of Gmina Kotuń, within Siedlce County, Masovian Voivodeship, in east-central Poland.
