= Łęki, Siedlce County =

Łęki
- Village
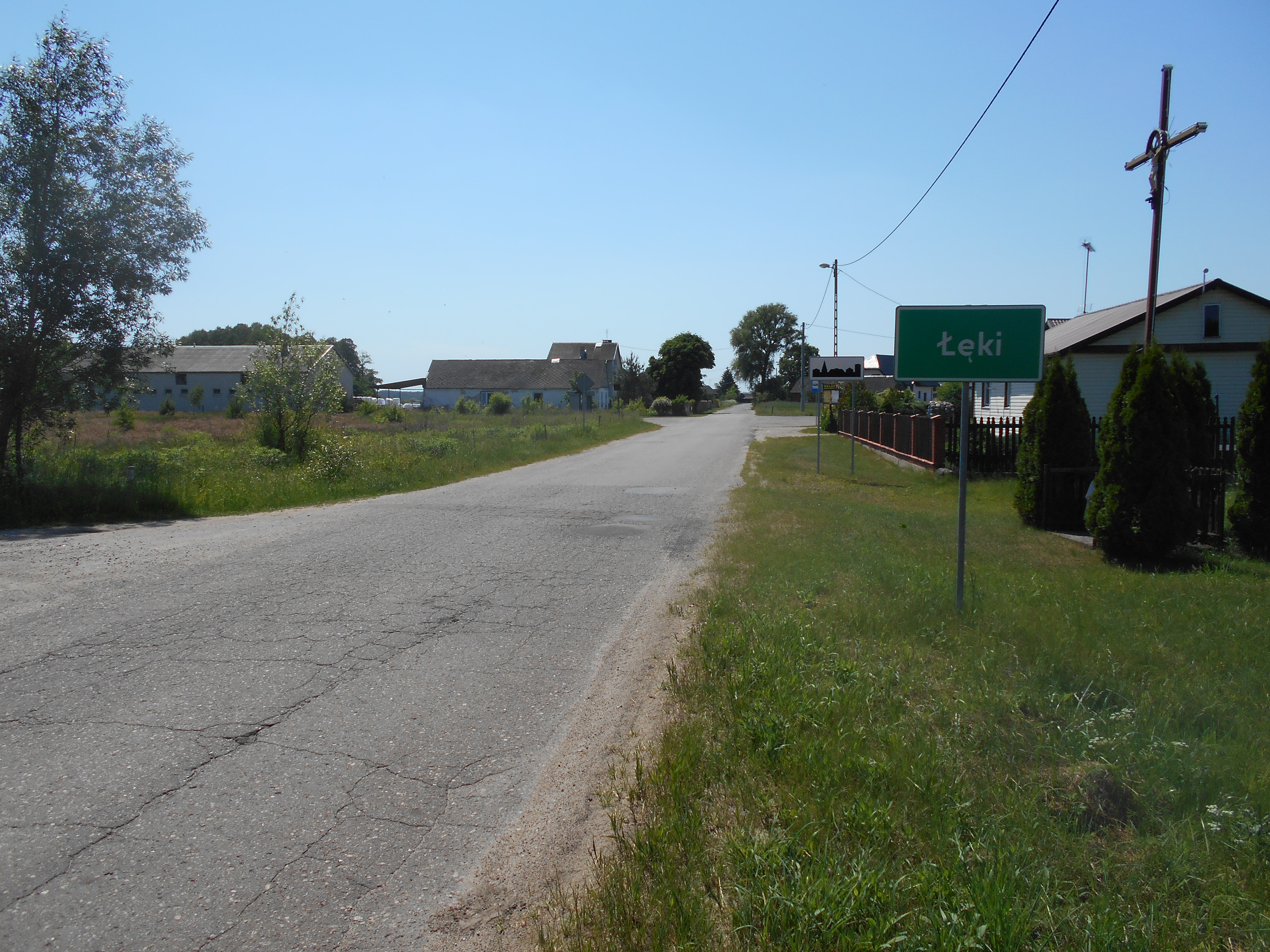

- Location within Poland
- Coordinates: 52°7′28″N 21°57′24″E
- Country: Poland
- Voivodeship: Masovian
- County: Siedlce
- Gmina: Kotuń
- Population: 140

Łęki [ˈwɛŋkʲi] is a village in the administrative district of Gmina Kotuń, within Siedlce County, Masovian Voivodeship, in east-central Poland.
