= Sosnowe =

- Village
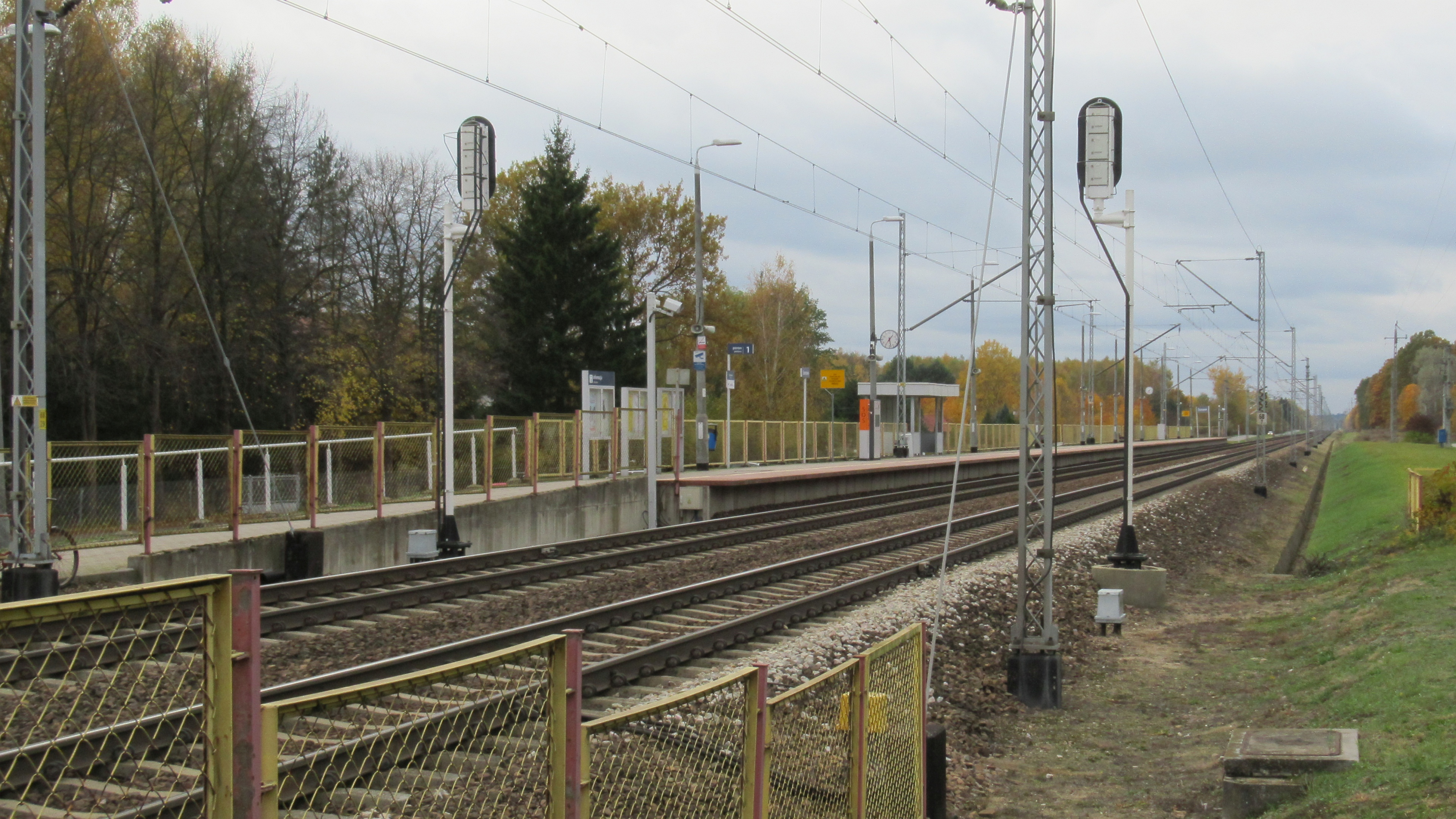
- Sosnowe railway station

- Location within Poland
- Coordinates: 52°9′N 21°57′E
- Country: Poland
- Voivodeship: Masovian
- County: Siedlce
- Gmina: Kotuń

Sosnowe [sɔsˈnɔvɛ] is a village in the administrative district of Gmina Kotuń, within Siedlce County, Masovian Voivodeship, in east-central Poland.
