= Pieróg, Poland =

Pieróg
- Village
- Location within Poland
- Coordinates: 52°10′N 22°5′E
- Country: Poland
- Voivodeship: Masovian
- County: Siedlce
- Gmina: Kotuń

Pieróg [ˈpjɛruk] is a village in the administrative district of Gmina Kotuń, within Siedlce County, Masovian Voivodeship, in east-central Poland.
