= Rajnold Suchodolski =

Polish poet

Rajnold Suchodolski (1804 – 8 September 1831, Warsaw) was a Polish poet.

He was brother of the painter January Suchodolski. Rajnold participated and died in the November Uprising of 1830–1831.

== Works ==
- Among others "Polonez Kościuszki" in "Ulubione pieśni" (1831).
