= Czarnowąż =

Village in Gmina Kotuń, Poland

- Village
- Location within Poland
- Coordinates: 52°13′26″N 22°03′55″E
- Country: Poland
- Voivodeship: Masovian
- County: Siedlce
- Gmina: Kotuń

Czarnowąż [t͡ʂarˈnɔvɔ̃ʂ] is a village in the administrative district of Gmina Kotuń, within Siedlce County, Masovian Voivodeship, in east-central Poland.
