= Nowa Dąbrówka =

- Village
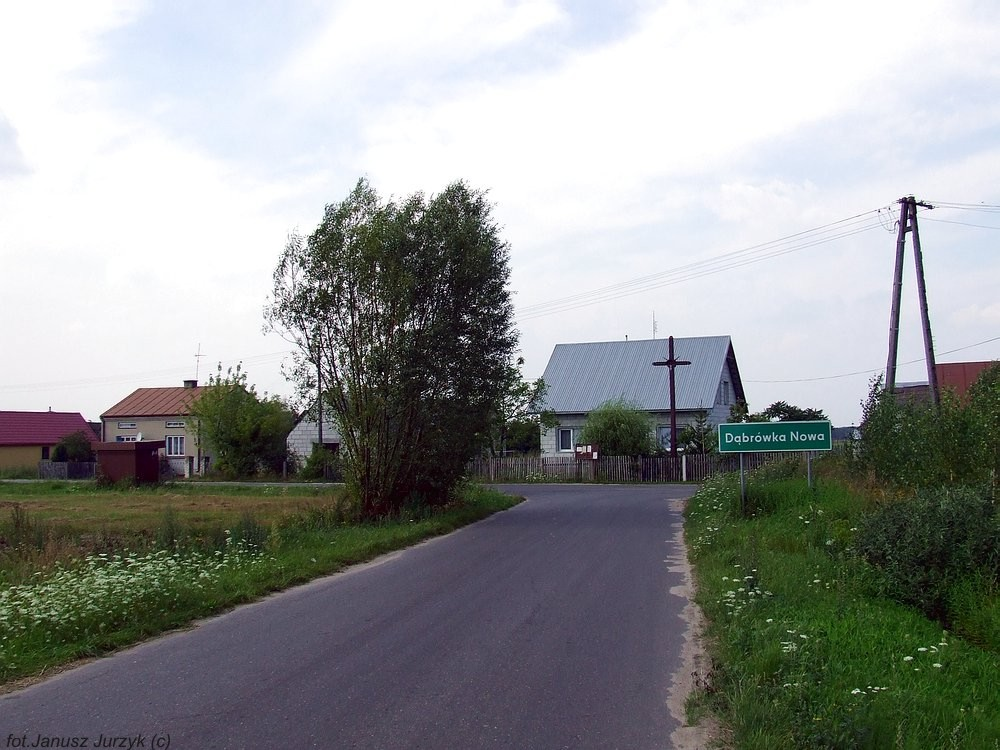

- Location within Poland
- Coordinates: 52°09′19″N 22°07′45″E
- Country: Poland
- Voivodeship: Masovian
- County: Siedlce
- Gmina: Kotuń

Nowa Dąbrówka [ˈnɔva dɔmˈbrufka] is a village in the administrative district of Gmina Kotuń, within Siedlce County, Masovian Voivodeship, in east-central Poland.
