= Albinów, Siedlce County =

Albinów
- Village
- Location within Poland
- Coordinates: 51°10′32″N 21°55′59″E
- Country: Poland
- Voivodeship: Masovian
- County: Siedlce
- Gmina: Kotuń

Albinów [alˈbinuf] is a village in the administrative district of Gmina Kotuń, within Siedlce County, Masovian Voivodeship, in east-central Poland.
