= Żdżar, Masovian Voivodeship =

Żdżar
- Village
- Location within Poland
- Coordinates: 52°12′N 21°57′E
- Country: Poland
- Voivodeship: Masovian
- County: Siedlce
- Gmina: Kotuń

Żdżar [ʐd͡ʐar] is a village in the administrative district of Gmina Kotuń, within Siedlce County, Masovian Voivodeship, in east-central Poland.
