= Jagodne, Siedlce County =

Jagodne
- Village
- Location within Poland
- Coordinates: 52°12′N 21°59′E
- Country: Poland
- Voivodeship: Masovian
- County: Siedlce
- Gmina: Kotuń

Jagodne [jaˈɡɔdnɛ] is a village in the administrative district of Gmina Kotuń, within Siedlce County, Masovian Voivodeship, in east-central Poland.
