= Siona =

Siona may refer to:

- Siona (moth), a genus of Geometer moth
- The Siona people of the Ecuadorian Amazon
  - The Siona language
- Siona Atreides, a fictional character in Frank Herbert's Dune universe
- Siona Shimshi (born 1939), Israeli painter, sculptor, ceramist, and textile designer
