= Bojmie =

- Village
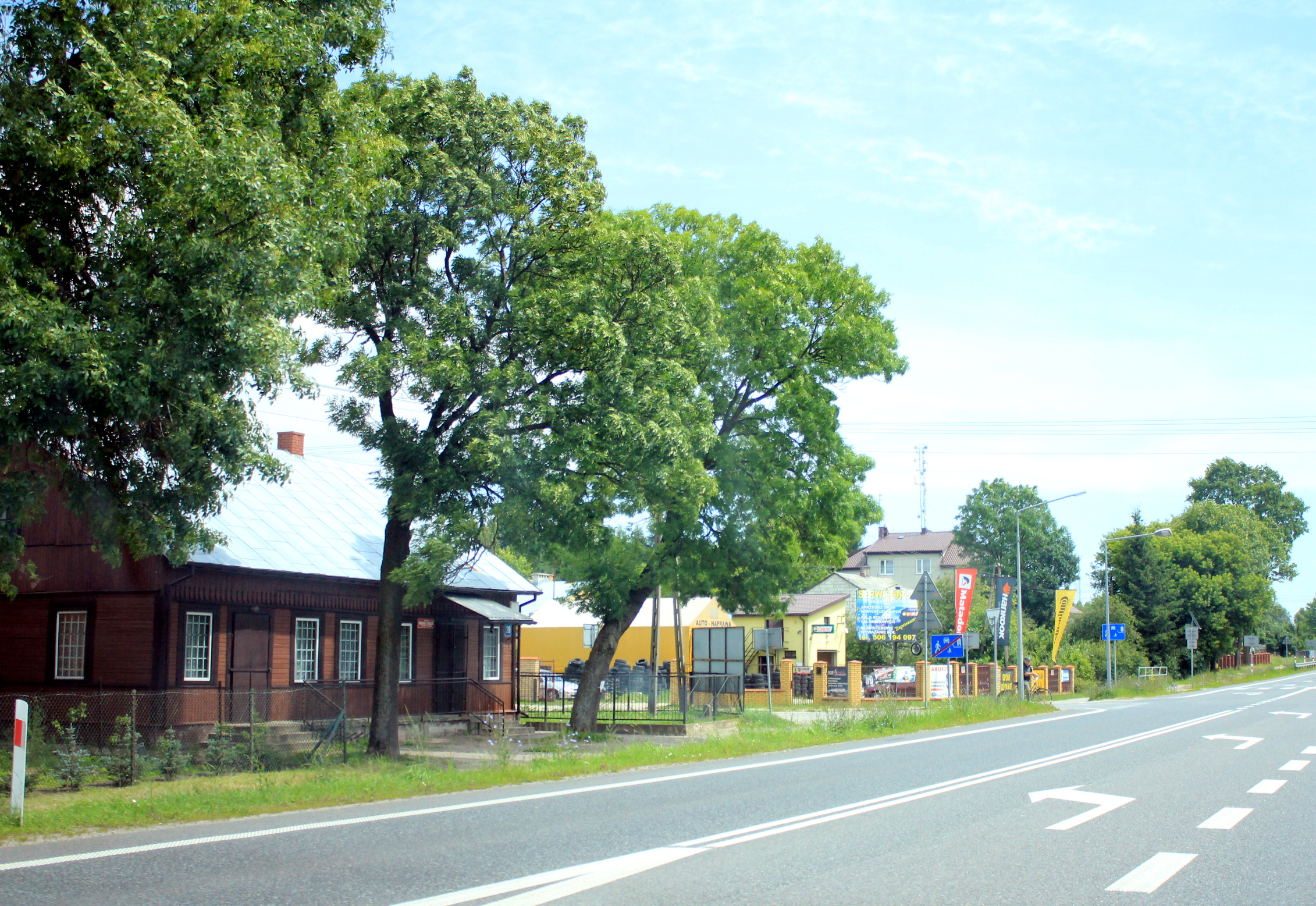

- Location within Poland
- Coordinates: 52°12′N 21°58′E
- Country: Poland
- Voivodeship: Masovian
- County: Siedlce
- Gmina: Kotuń

Bojmie [ˈbɔi̯mjɛ] is a village in the administrative district of Gmina Kotuń, within Siedlce County, Masovian Voivodeship, in east-central Poland.
