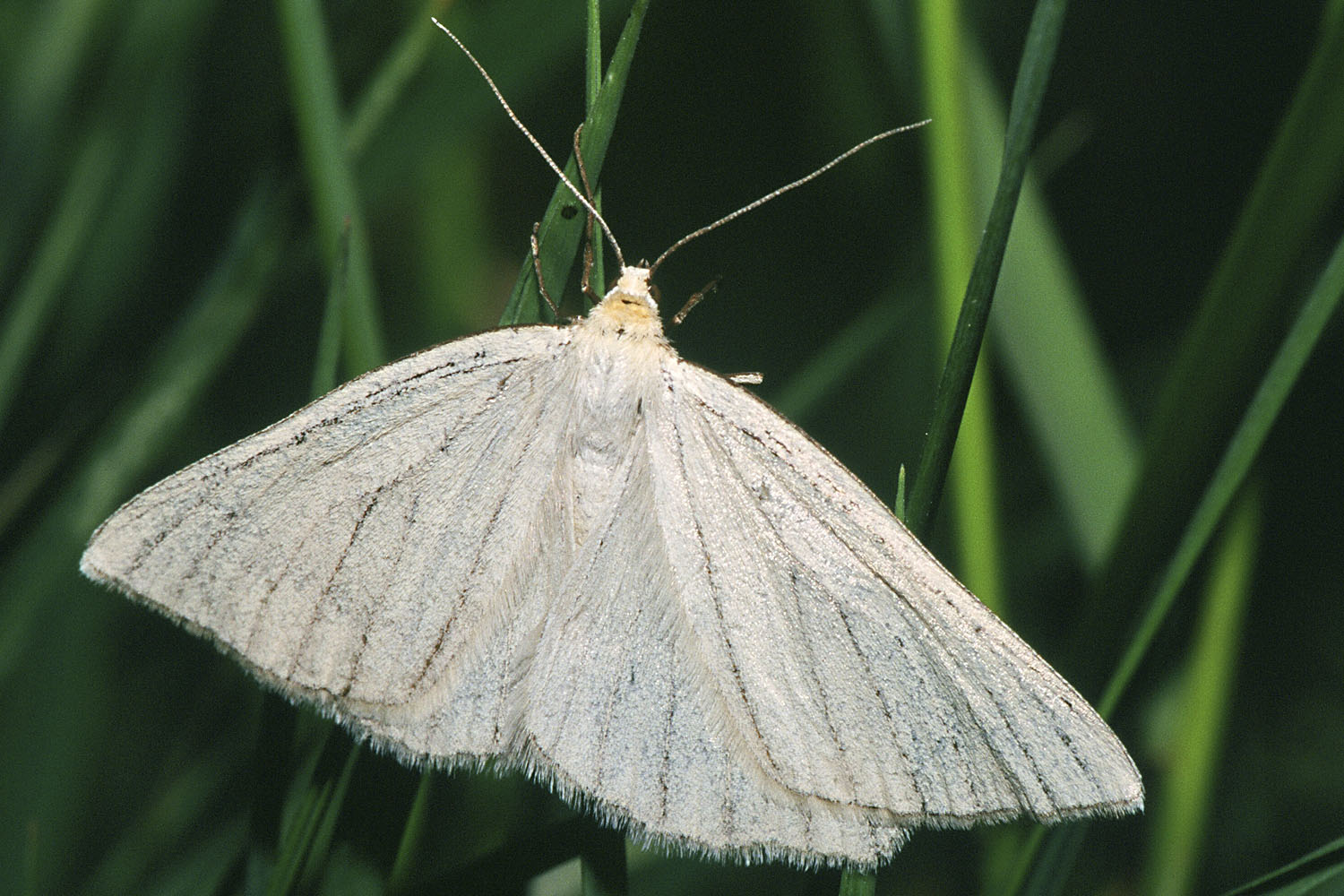

Scientific classification
- Domain: Eukaryota
- Kingdom: Animalia
- Phylum: Arthropoda
- Class: Insecta
- Order: Lepidoptera
- Family: Geometridae
- Subfamily: Ennominae
- Genus: Siona; Duponchel, 1829

Synonyms
- Scoria Stephens, 1831

= Siona (moth) =

Genus of moths

Siona is a genus of moths in the family Geometridae erected by Philogène Auguste Joseph Duponchel in 1829.

== Species ==
- Siona galactica Prout, 1929
- Siona lineata (Scopoli, 1763)
