= Łączka, Siedlce County =

Łączka
- Village
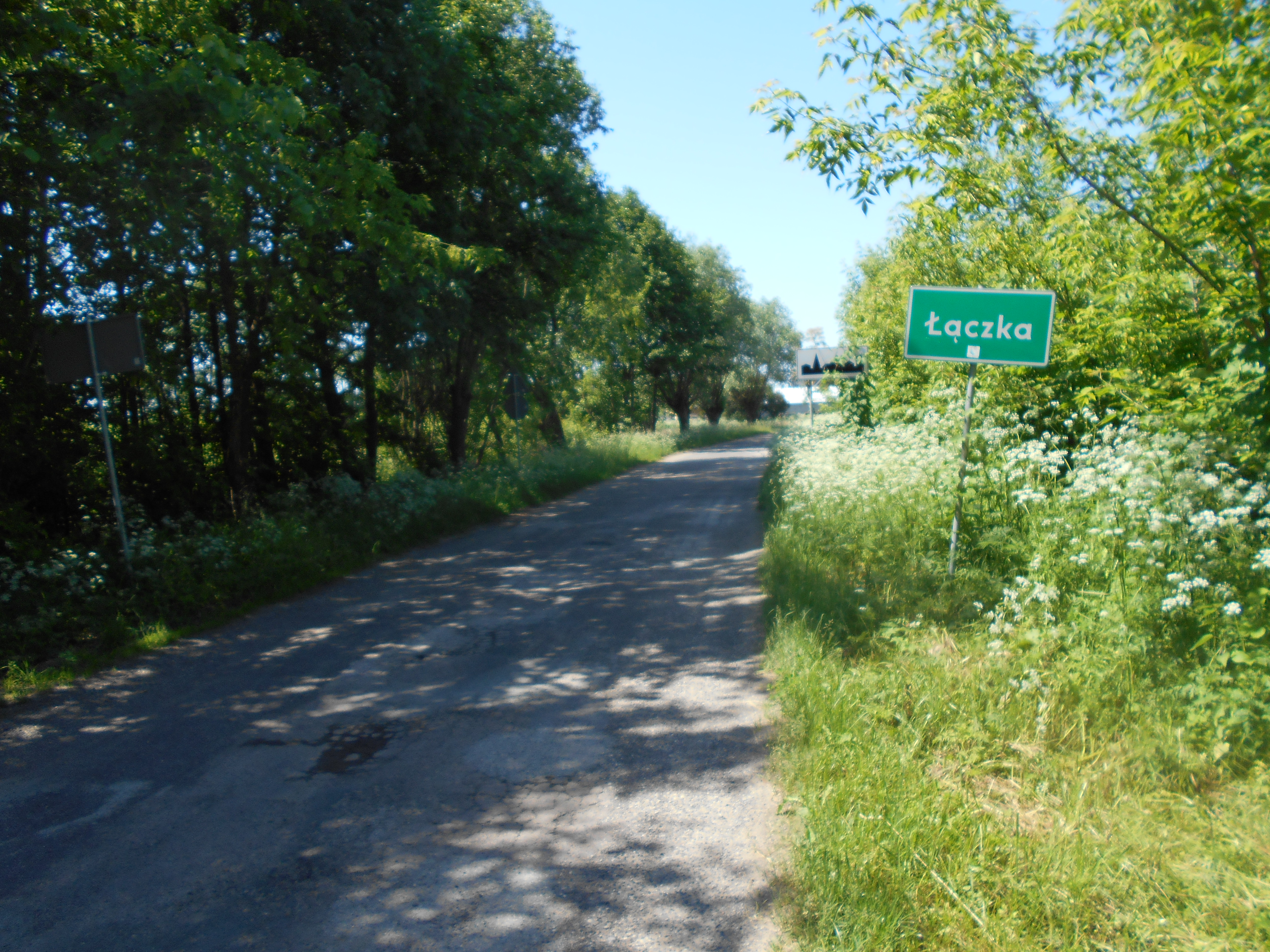

- Location within Poland
- Coordinates: 52°9′N 21°57′E
- Country: Poland
- Voivodeship: Masovian
- County: Siedlce
- Gmina: Kotuń

Łączka [ˈwɔnt͡ʂka] is a village in the administrative district of Gmina Kotuń, within Siedlce County, Masovian Voivodeship, in east-central Poland.
