= Wiktor Gilewicz =

Radio communication office

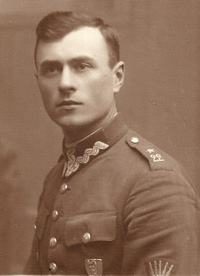
Wiktor Gilewicz

Wiktor Gilewicz codename "Wolf" (b. 13 January 1907 Glukhov, Sumy Region – currently Ukraine, d. 10 November 1948 Kozhva, Pechora Region, Komi Republic – currently Russia) was a radio communication officer, captain of the Polish Home Army, and chief of the Section V (Communication) of the Command of Siedlce Region ZWZ-AK "Sowa" – "Jesion" in 1941–1944.

== Family ==
Wiktor was a son of Piotr Gilewicz, court judge in Białystok, and Adela (nee Ostrowska). Piotr Gilewicz was arrested by the NKVD at the beginning of the WW2, straight after the Red Army invaded Poland, and he died on the way to Siberia in 1939. Wiktor's grandfather was Celestyn Gilewicz of the coat-of-arms Grzymała, who is buried in the cemetery in Zhytomyr.

== Biography ==
Wiktor graduated the Infantry Officers School (Szkoła Podchorążych Piechoty) in Komorowo near Ostrów Mazowiecka in August 1930. After the graduation he served in the 22 Infantry Regiment in Siedlce in the rank of captain. He fought during the September Campaign in the 22 Infantry Regiment within the "Pomorze” Army and, after injuring his leg in the Kampinos Forest, was taken prisoner. After the arrest he stayed in the Polish Red Cross hospital in Smolna Street, and was released in late November/early December following an application from his wife so that he could see his new born son. When he later came back to Warsaw the prisoners from the hospital had already been taken to camps in Germany specifically catering for officers, so called Oflags. He then went back to his family in Siedlce and started to work for an underground organisation as a communication officer. In 1941–1944 he acted as a chief of Section V (Communication) of Command of the Siedlce Region ZWZ-AK "Sowa" – "Jesion". One of the radio stations under his command was in a village of Łepki gm. Świniarów. This radio station was used during the whole German occupation in spite of numerous attempts to locate it by using the German plane Storch. It was operated by wireless operator Jan Szklarczyk "Kod”.

In 1942/43, instructed by the Regional Command, Wiktor ordered establishment of a telegraphic platoon which was soon answering to the "Orbis” squadron and General Command of the Home Army. The platoon operated in the regions siedlecki, sokołowski and węgrowski and consisted of 5-7 receiving/transmitting stations, including two in the town of Siedlce. It was communicating with the centre in Stanmore, England, and from 1943 Bari, Italy, where from they got information about the drops from airplanes. In 1944 wireless operator Franciszek Dudewicz, through London, communicated with the Staff of gen. Władysław Anders in Italy.

Wiktor was one of the lecturers on the Course for the Infantry Officers in Kotuń - from October 1942 until July 1943 he lectured on wireless communication. From mid 1943 he taught wireless communication in the Mordy centre. The organiser and lecturer in this course was Wiktor Stański "Iskra”. Other lecturers of this course included second lieutenant Jan Gilewicz "Wulkan” and lieutenant Ludwik Skorupka "Gruszka”.

In May 1944, as a commanding communication officer in "Jesion" region, he was responsible for the location and safety of transmitting of a radio station for three days in the villages of Niwka and Skórzec near Siedlce. The wireless operator was corporal Franciszek Dudewicz "Bąk”. The messages were about retrieving the German V-2 rocket which fell into Bug river near Klimczyce and Mężenin on the 20 May 1944 and did not explode. The parts of the rocket were later transported to London on Dakota transport plane as a part of Operation Most III.

In November 1944 he was arrested by NKVD in his family house at Wojska Polskiego street in Siedlce. He was imprisoned in Siedlce, then taken to Kutno. After a trial in Kutno on 23 January 1945 he was sentenced to 10 years of working camps in SSSR. He was then imprisoned in Gniezno, and in February 1945 he was taken to Brest with some others prisoners. In March 1945 he was then taken to Siberia, via Krasnoyarsk and Kansk.

A single letter reached his family in Poland, dated 4 March 1946, sent from camp Bolszaja Inta in Kozhvinski Rayon, Komi ASSR. The letter was written to his sister in Russia and was then passed to his family in Poland - it was not possible to post letters directly to Poland. According to the information of Polish Red Cross received on in 1960 (and later confirmed in 1993 from the "Memorial” society), he died on 10 November 1948 in Kozhva – one of the work camps near a town of Pechora.

On 11 November 1991 a memorial plaque was unveiled on the Church of St Stanislaw (in Siedlce) commemorating the commanders of the Home Army in the Siedlce region who have been murdered by Soviets following the liberation of the region of the German occupation, the list includes the name of Wiktor Gilewicz.
