= Janusz Gmitruk =

Polish historian, museum curator, academic teacher

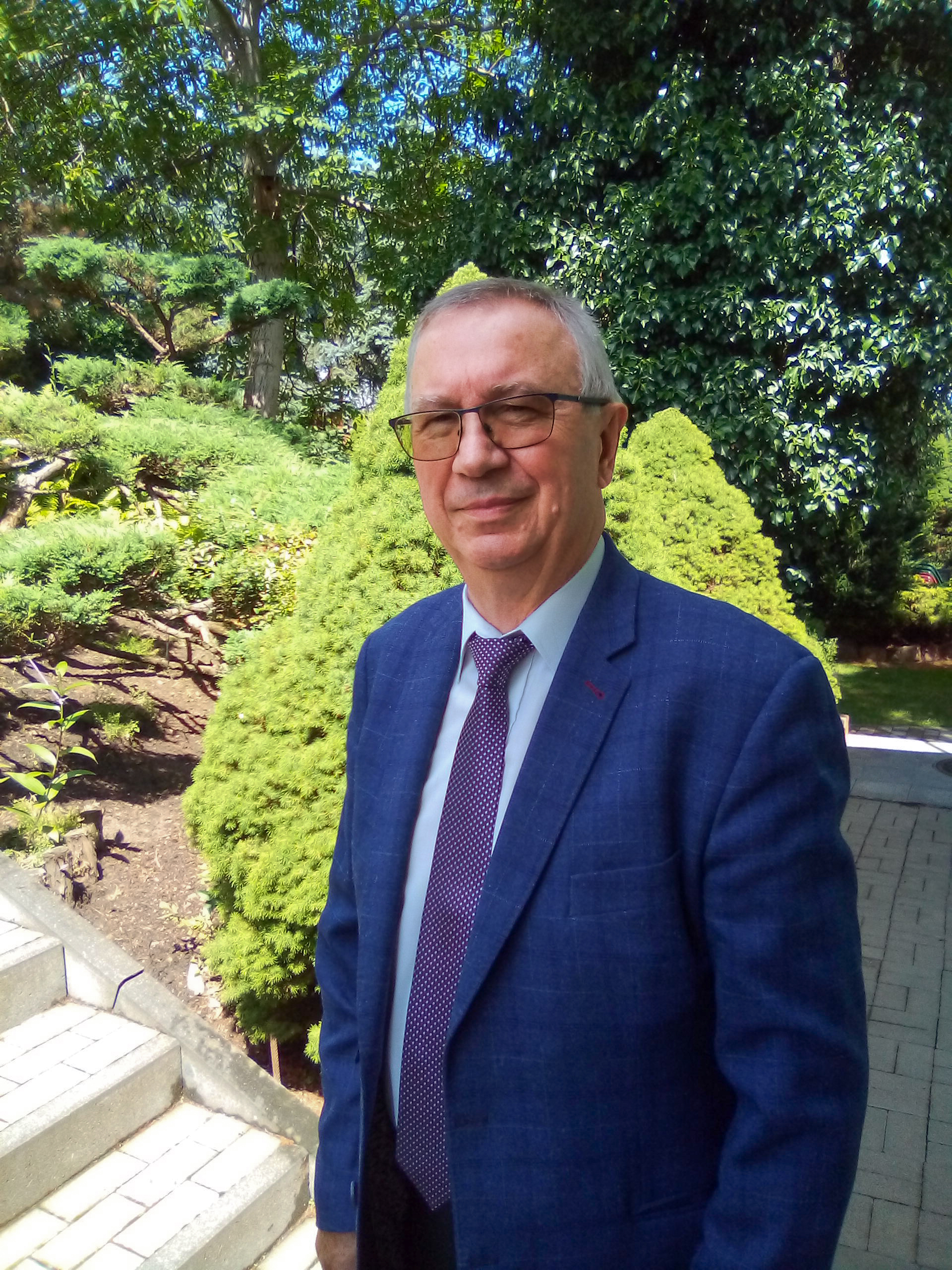
- Gmitruk in 2023
- Born: February 17, 1948 (age 78); Świniarów
- Education: University of Warsaw
- Awards: Order of Polonia Restituta, Cross of Merit, Cross of the Peasant Battalions, Gloria Artis Medal for Merit to Culture, Medal of Merit for National Defence, Medal of Merit for Firefighting, Pro Patria Medal, Pro Memoria Medal
- Scientific career
- Fields: contemporary history of Poland, history of the peasant movement

Janusz Gmitruk (born 17 February 1948 in Świniarów) is a Polish historian, museum curator, academic teacher, and Doctor of Humanities.

He is a specialist in contemporary Polish history and the peasant movement, as well as the martyrology of Polish villages, the Peasant Battalions, and the Polish Underground State during World War II, as well as the peasant resistance movement after the war. He is the author of numerous articles, books, and exhibitions on these topics. He has served as the long-time editor-in-chief of Roczniki Dziejów Ruchu Ludowego and Rocznik Historyczny Muzeum Historii Polskiego Ruchu Ludowego, as well as the director of the Museum of the Polish Peasant Movement and president of the board of the People's Scientific and Cultural Society.

== Biography ==
=== Childhood and education ===
Janusz Gmitruk was born on 17 February 1948 in the village of Świniarów in Łosice County into a peasant family of Paweł Gmitriuk and Genowefa, née Oleksiuk. From 1955 to 1962, he attended Primary School No. 2 in Łosice, and later continued his education at Józef Pietruczuk High School, graduating in 1966. After passing the entrance exams, he began studying history at the Faculty of History of the University of Warsaw on 1 October 1966.

As a student, he participated in history competitions. During his university years, he took part in academic field camps organized in Siedlce County and its surroundings by the University Board of the Rural Youth Union. He was also active in the student research club at the Institute of History of the University of Warsaw, led by docent Józef Szaflik. During these excursions, students gathered information from local residents, including former peasant partisans, about the activities of political parties in the interwar period and the resistance movement during World War II.

It was Józef Szaflik who sparked his interest in the history of the peasant movement and encouraged him to write his master's thesis on the resistance movement. His thesis, titled The Underground Peasant Movement in Siedlce County in 1939–1945, was supervised by Professor Stanisław Herbst, with Szaflik serving as the reviewer. In 1970, Szaflik defended his habilitation, while Gmitruk defended his master's thesis in June 1971 at his professor's private residence, as Herbst was ill at the time. The exam lasted two hours and concluded with an excellent result, earning Gmitruk a Master of History degree. His thesis was awarded in history competitions and later published as an article in issue 14 of Roczniki Dziejów Ruchu Ludowego in 1972.

=== Academic and professional work ===
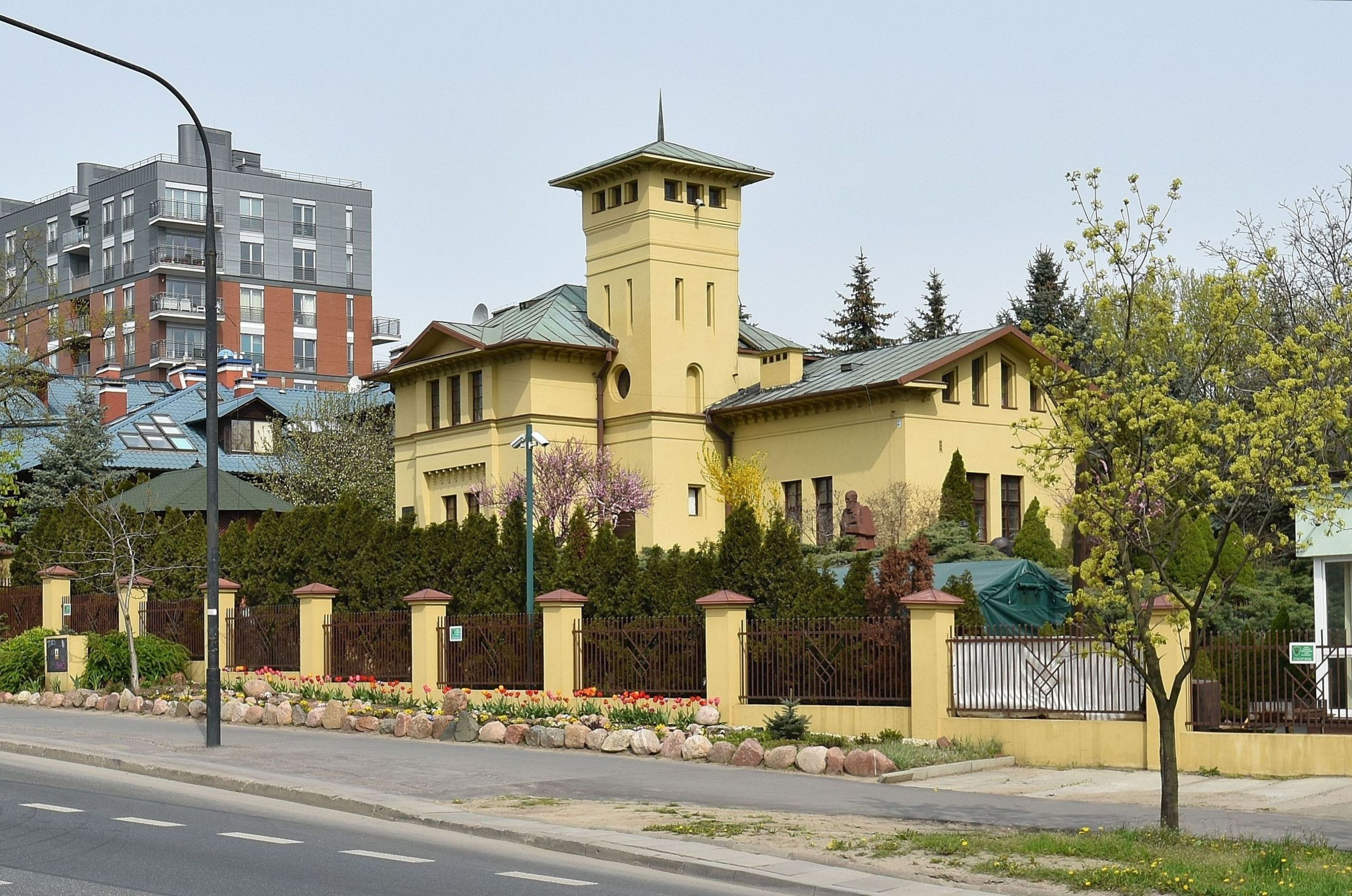
Museum of the Polish Peasant Movement, where Gmitruk serves as director

Janusz Gmitruk was a member of the Rural Youth Union. During his university years, in 1970, he joined the United People's Party. From 1 October 1971, he was employed at the Institute of the History of the Peasant Movement of the Supreme Committee of the United People's Party (since 1990, the Supreme Committee of the Polish People's Party). He advanced within the institution, eventually becoming deputy director and later director (currently on leave).

At the institute, he managed the Iconographic Archive, collecting photographs from veterans of the peasant movement and their families, documenting them, recording testimonies, and encouraging his interviewees to write memoirs. He collaborated with notable figures such as General Franciszek Kamiński, the commander-in-chief of the Peasant Battalions, as well as Józef Abramczyk, Eugeniusz Fąfara, Stanisław Jagiełło, Piotr Pawlina, Antoni Piwowarczyk, Czesław Poniecki, and Jan Sońta. His research and archival work culminated in his doctoral dissertation, The Underground Resistance Movement in the Kielce Land 1939–1945, which he defended in 1979 at the University of Warsaw under the supervision of Professor Józef Szaflik. The following year, it was published by the Ludowa Spółdzielnia Wydawnicza publishing house.

Gmitruk combined his work at the Institute of the History of the Peasant Movement and later at the Museum of the Polish Peasant Movement with academic and teaching activities, collaborating with universities in Podlachia and the Siedlce University of Natural Sciences and Humanities. During this period, he also co-organized and organized exhibitions with the support of scholars such as Aleksander Łuczak and Kazimierz Przybysz, as well as the United People's Party politician Jerzy Szymanek. He participated in the work of the Committee for the Martyrology of Villages within the Chief Commission for the Prosecution of Crimes against the Polish Nation. He was also active in the Organizing Committee for the Construction of the Mausoleum of Polish Rural Martyrology in Michniów. At Gmitruk's initiative, the mausoleum hosted a permanent exhibition titled When the Sky and Earth Were Burning.

Gmitruk played a key role in the efforts that led to the establishment of the Museum of the Polish Peasant Movement in Warsaw in 1984. He collaborated on shaping the institution with Józef Fajkowski, the special representative of United People's Party President Roman Malinowski for the organization of the museum, who later became its first director. For the museum's grand opening in 1985, Gmitruk, together with Sałkowski, organized the first exhibition, dedicated to the 90th anniversary of the Polish Peasant Movement, which was displayed at the National Museum of Ethnography. For the opening of the museum's headquarters at Żółta Karczma, he and his team prepared the exhibition Peasant Battalions (1940–1944).

From 1988 to 1989, Gmitruk served as deputy director of the Institute of the History of the Peasant Movement. On 26–27 November 1989, the 11th Extraordinary Congress of the United People's Party was held in Warsaw, where a resolution was passed to dissolve the party's political activities and establish the Polish People's Party Odrodzenie, which took over all United People's Party assets. On 1 January 1990, the leadership of the new party appointed Gmitruk as director of the Institute of the History of the Peasant Movement. In this role, he secured the institute's collections and prepared them for further access by researchers studying Polish history and the history of the Polish peasant movement. His organizational and political skills, along with the strength of the peasant movement tradition, enabled the institute to withstand personnel changes and political upheavals.

On 5 May 1990, the Unity Congress of the Polish People's Party took place, during which Polish People's Party Odrodzenie, Polish People's Party (Wilanów faction), and part of Polish People's Party Solidarity merged into a single Polish People's Party. As director of the Institute of the History of the Peasant Movement, Gmitruk participated for many years in meetings of the Supreme Executive Committee and the Supreme Council of Polish People's Party in an advisory capacity, was a member of the Polish People's Party expert team, and served as an advisor in the Polish People's Party parliamentary club.

Since 1992, Gmitruk has been the editor-in-chief of Roczniki Dziejów Ruchu Ludowego.

On 3 September 1997, the Minister of Culture and Art, Zdzisław Podkański, appointed Gmitruk as the director of the Museum of the Polish Peasant Movement for a five-year contract, which was later renewed multiple times. The museum became an organizational unit of the Masovian Voivodeship. Gmitruk also assumed the role of editor-in-chief of the journal Rocznik Historyczny Muzeum Historii Polskiego Ruchu Ludowego. As the new director, he rejuvenated the museum's staff, and the institution itself underwent a transformation, opening up to new scientific communities. Thanks to these changes, the museum, as a research institution, allowed employees to pursue their academic ambitions, preparing doctoral dissertations and earning habilitation degrees. The museum began publishing research papers, books, and scholarly articles and organizing exhibitions. As a result, the museum became an important publishing center in Poland. It also served as the People's Museum Center by uniting various societies and institutions.

Gmitruk has been a member, and since 2008, the president of the board of the People's Scientific and Cultural Society.

Gmitruk's research interests include the martyrology of Polish villages between 1939 and 1945, the Polish Underground State, the Peasant Battalions, the peasant resistance movement after World War II, and the history of rural youth movements.

=== Social engagement ===
For 10 years, Gmitruk served as a lay judge in the District Court of Warsaw. He was also a long-time member of the Workers' Council in the National Committee of the United People's Party, and, on its behalf, he chaired the Loan and Welfare Fund for 13 years (until the political transformation in 1989). Since 1992, he has been collaborating with the Main Board of the Voluntary Firefighter Association, where he is a member of the executive board, vice-chairman of the Historical Commission, and co-editor of the association's journal Zeszyty Historyczne ZG ZOSP.

== Controversies ==
In 2013, the lustration court imposed a five-year ban on Gmitruk holding public office and his eligibility for elections, including to the Sejm, after determining that he had submitted a false lustration declaration in 2007, in which he concealed his collaboration with the Security Service from 1974 to 1980. His file as a covert agent under the pseudonym XX-24 is included in the archival inventory of the Institute of National Remembrance. Gmitruk was accused of collaborating with the Security Service, with one of the key accusers being Andrzej Friszke, who stated that Gmitruk's reports to the Security Service had hindered his academic career.

== Private life ==
In his youth, Janusz Gmitruk played football and volleyball. He is passionate about photography (in March 1968, he was beaten by the Motorized Reserves of the Citizens' Militia officers while trying to document events at the university) and skiing in the Polish Tatra Mountains. He is also interested in art, painting, and garden architecture.

Gmitruk and his wife Beata have two adult sons.

== Publications ==
Gmitruk is the author of articles published in journals such as Jutro Polski, Mówią Wieki, Polityka, Roczniki Dziejów Ruchu Ludowego, Rocznik Historyczny Muzeum Historii Polskiego Ruchu Ludowego, Strażak, Tygodnik Kulturalny, Wieści, Zielony Sztandar, as well as in book publications.

== Awards and honors ==
For his academic and professional work, he has been awarded, decorated, and distinguished with, among others:

- In 1999, by President Aleksander Kwaśniewski, the Knight's Cross of the Order of Polonia Restituta
- Gold and Silver Cross of Merit
- Silver Gloria Artis Medal for Merit to Culture
- Cross of the Peasant Battalions
- Gold Medal of Merit for National Defence
- Gold and Silver Medal of Merit for Firefighting
- Pro Patria Medal
- Pro Memoria Medal
- Pro Masovia Memorial Medal
- Honorary Badge for Merits to the Siberian Exiles' Association
- Gold Honorary Badge of the Rural Youth Union
- Honorary Badge For Merits to the Rural Youth Union
- Ignacy Solarz Award
- Medal For Merits to the Peasant Movement in the name of Wincenty Witos
- Golden Clover (Polish People's Party)
- Meritorious for Warsaw Badge
- In 2019, the International Order of Saint Stanislaus, 1st class (private award)

== Bibliography ==
- Turkowski, Romuald (2018). "Laudacja prof. dr. hab. Romualda Turkowskiego wygłoszona podczas Jubileuszu dr. Janusza Gmitruka – dyrektora Muzeum Historii Polskiego Ruchu Ludowego 4 lipca 2018 r." [Laudation by Prof. Dr. Hab. Romuald Turkowski Delivered During the Jubilee of Dr. Janusz Gmitruk – Director of the Museum of the Polish Peasant Movement on 4 July 2018]. Rocznik Historyczny Muzeum Historii Polskiego Ruchu Ludowego (in Polish).
