= Zelkow =

Zelkow may refer to the following places in Poland:

- Zelków, Lesser Poland Voivodeship (south Poland)
- Żelków, Masovian Voivodeship (east-central Poland)
