= Nowaki =

Nowaki may refer to:

- Nowaki, Masovian Voivodeship (east-central Poland)
- Nowaki, Opole Voivodeship (south-west Poland)
- Nowaki, Warmian-Masurian Voivodeship (north Poland)
- Nowaki (novel), a short Japanese novel by Natsume Sōseki (1867-1916)
- Japanese destroyer Nowaki
