= Regina Fleszarowa =

Polish geologist, librarian and Senator

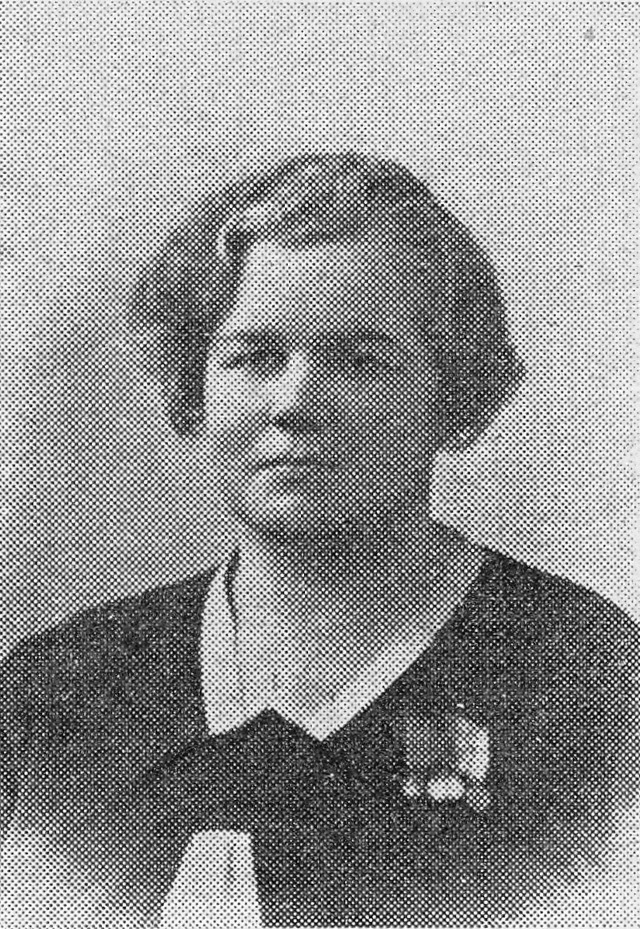
- Born: Regina Zofia Danysz; 28 March 1888; Wiśniewo, Siedlce Governorate, Russian Poland
- Died: 1 July 1969 (aged 81); On a boat in the Vistula river, Polish People's Republic
- Other names: Regina Danysz-Fleszarowa
- Occupations: geologist, librarian, senator
- Years active: 1913–1958

Regina Fleszarowa (28 March 1888 – 1 July 1969) was a Polish geographer and geologist, who participated in women's rights and served as a Senator in the Second Polish Republic between 1935 and 1938. Studying at the Sorbonne, in 1913, she received the first PhD in natural sciences awarded to a Polish woman. Considered a pioneer in establishing earth sciences in Poland, she published over 100 works concerning the geography and geology of the country. Her 5 volume bibliography on the history of earth sciences in Poland is considered her greatest achievement. She was awarded the 1st Class Banner of the Order of Labor in 1960.

== Early life ==
Regina Zofia Danysz was born on 28 March 1888 in Wiśniewo in the Siedlce Governorate of Russian Poland to Piotr Danysz. Her parents owned a small estate in Brusów, where she was raised and completed her elementary education. She went on to study in Warsaw and Kiev, before moving to Zürich in 1906. Focusing her education on geography, Danysz moved to Paris in 1907, to attend lectures on geography and geology, participating in research trips during the semester breaks to the Tatra Mountains and Kujawy, which were led by Ludomir Sawicki. In 1910, she received her licenciée in science from the University of Paris in 1910, continuing on with doctoral studies. Studying with Eugeniusz Romer and Charles Vélain, she prepared a thesis, Etude critique d'une carte ancienne de Pologne dresée par Stanislas Staszic (1806) (Critical study of an old map of Poland created by Stanislas Staszic [1806]) which analyzed his topographical work in the Carpathian Mountains. Early in 1913, she received the first PhD of natural sciences awarded to a Polish woman.

== Career ==
Beginning in 1912, Danysz lectured on topology and was active in the Rifle Association, as well as the women's legionnaires. She began her career in 1913 working with Romer, who was at the University of Lviv, compiling information on atmospheric precipitation over various locations throughout Poland. While working with Romer, she met a fellow geologist, Albin Fleszar, whom she would later marry. Danysz and Romer published their findings in Warsaw in 1913. Moving to Zakopane around 1915, she became active in the press for women's rights and served as chair of the Council of Polish Women (Polish: Rady Polek), attending the European conventions of the International Council of Women in Brussels, Dubrovnik and Edinburgh. She and Felszar married and had a son, Mieczysław Albin. The couple worked together on geological surveys in the Carpathian Mountains. After her husband's death in 1916, Fleszarowa and her son moved to Warsaw, where she worked for a short time at the Ministry of Public Enlightenment. In 1918, she helped found the Polish Geographical Society (Polish: Polskie Towarzystwo Geograficzne, PTG).

In 1919, Fleszarowa became the librarian for the National Geological Institute in Warsaw. and acquired a collection of over 30,000 volumes during her tenure, which lasted until World War II. She simultaneously continued her research, publishing articles such as Stanisław Staszic jako przyrodnik (Stanisław Staszic as a naturalist, 1926) and Spis jaskiń krajowych (List of National Caves, 1933) in scientific journals. Between 1920 and 1939, Fleszarowa published 18 texts for the Geological Bibliography of Poland. She also worked as an editor for Ziemia, the journal of the Geographical Society starting in 1929. Over her lifetime, Fleszarowa published over 100 articles on the scientific history and geography of Poland, including compiling studies of Russian scientists on Polish territories, gathering information through questionnaires about the geological work done during the Occupation, as well as publishing a biographical dictionary of Polish geologists.

Fleszarowa was appointed in 1935 to serve as a Senator by the President of the Polish Republic. During her tenure, she focused on formal organization of scientific pursuits and expanding the rights of citizens. In 1937 was one of the organizers of the Democratic Club of Warsaw, serving as its vice-president and Democratic Alliance Party. Her Senate term ended in 1938 and during the Occupation of Poland, she joined the underground movement, participating in the Home Army. Working in developing information and propaganda for the Home Army, she distributed maps and published literature, setting up an editorial office for underground writings. She worked to hide Jews, and led secret meeting of librarians, leading the effort to hide the archive of the Association of Polish Librarians. Fleeing the city before the Warsaw Uprising in 1944, Fleszarowa went to Lublin and worked as a contact to the Polish Committee of National Liberation. In October 1944, she was appointed head of the Library Department of the Ministry of Education.

In 1945, she served as co-founder in reorganizing the Women's League and was appointed to serve in the Ministry of Foreign Affairs of the Democratic Party government. Participating in peace conferences held in Moscow, Paris, Potsdam and Prague, she was one of the cartographers who delineated the western Polish border. From 1945 to 1948, she served on the City Council of Warsaw. In 1951 she began working at the Museum of Earth for the Polish Academy of Sciences. She prepared a bibliography on the history of earth sciences in Poland, covering a 200-year period, prior to her retirement in 1958. This work was her "greatest scientific achievement", covering material from the mid-eighteenth century through the mid-twentieth century in 5 volumes. The first volumes, published in 1957 covered the twentieth century and the last volume, published in 1966 covered the material through the end of the 19th century, summarizing documents found in the records published by the Polish Geological Institute. Because she retired before the second volume was published, other editors worked to complete the publishing.

After her retirement, Fleszarowa continued her work with the Women's League and attending meetings of the Polish Academy of Sciences, publishing works such as the Materiałach i Studiach z Dziejów Nauki Polskiej (Materials and Studies of the History of Polish Science) and two extensive studies. One of them evaluated the 200 year old geological map of Poland by J. S. Guetard and the other discussed Warsaw as it was described in The Physiographic Diary between 1881 and 1921. In 1960, she was awarded the 1st Class Banner of the Order of Labor.

== Death and legacy ==
Fleszarowa died on board ship during a cruise on the Vistula river on 30 June or 1 July 1969. She was buried in Warsaw's Powązki Cemetery. Her masterwork on the bibliography on the history of earth sciences has been supplemented by later scientists and she is viewed as a pioneer for establishing the field of earth science in Poland.

== See also ==
- Timeline of women in science
