= Hilevich =

Hilevich (Belarusian: Гілевіч, Polonized: Gilewicz, Russified: Gilevich) is a Belarusian language surname derived from the word 'гіль', bullfinch with a patronymic suffix '-ich'. It may refer to:

- Radosław Gilewicz (born 1971), Polish footballer
- Nil Hilevich (1931–2016), Belarusian poet
- Mikola Hil (born Mikalai Hilevich, 1936–2022), Belarusian writer and journalist
- Wiktor Gilewicz (1907–1948), Polish military officer
