= Ciosny =

Ciosny may refer to the following places:

- Ciosny, Tomaszów County in Łódź Voivodeship (central Poland)
- Ciosny, Zgierz County in Łódź Voivodeship (central Poland)
- Ciosny, Masovian Voivodeship (east-central Poland)
