= Zebrak =

Žebrák or Żebrak may refer to places:

- Žebrák, a town in the Central Bohemian Region of the Czech Republic
  - Žebrák Castle, a ruined castle near Žebrák in the Točník municipality
- Žebrák, a village and part of Nečín in the Central Bohemian Region of the Czech Republic
- Żebrak, a village in Masovian Voivodeship, Poland
