= Grala-Dąbrowizna =

- Village
- Location within Poland
- Coordinates: 52°4′N 22°6′E
- Country: Poland
- Voivodeship: Masovian
- County: Siedlce
- Gmina: Skórzec

Grala-Dąbrowizna [ˈɡrala dɔmbrɔˈvizna] is a village in the administrative district of Gmina Skórzec, within Siedlce County, Masovian Voivodeship, in east-central Poland.
