= Mroczki, Siedlce County =

Mroczki
- Village
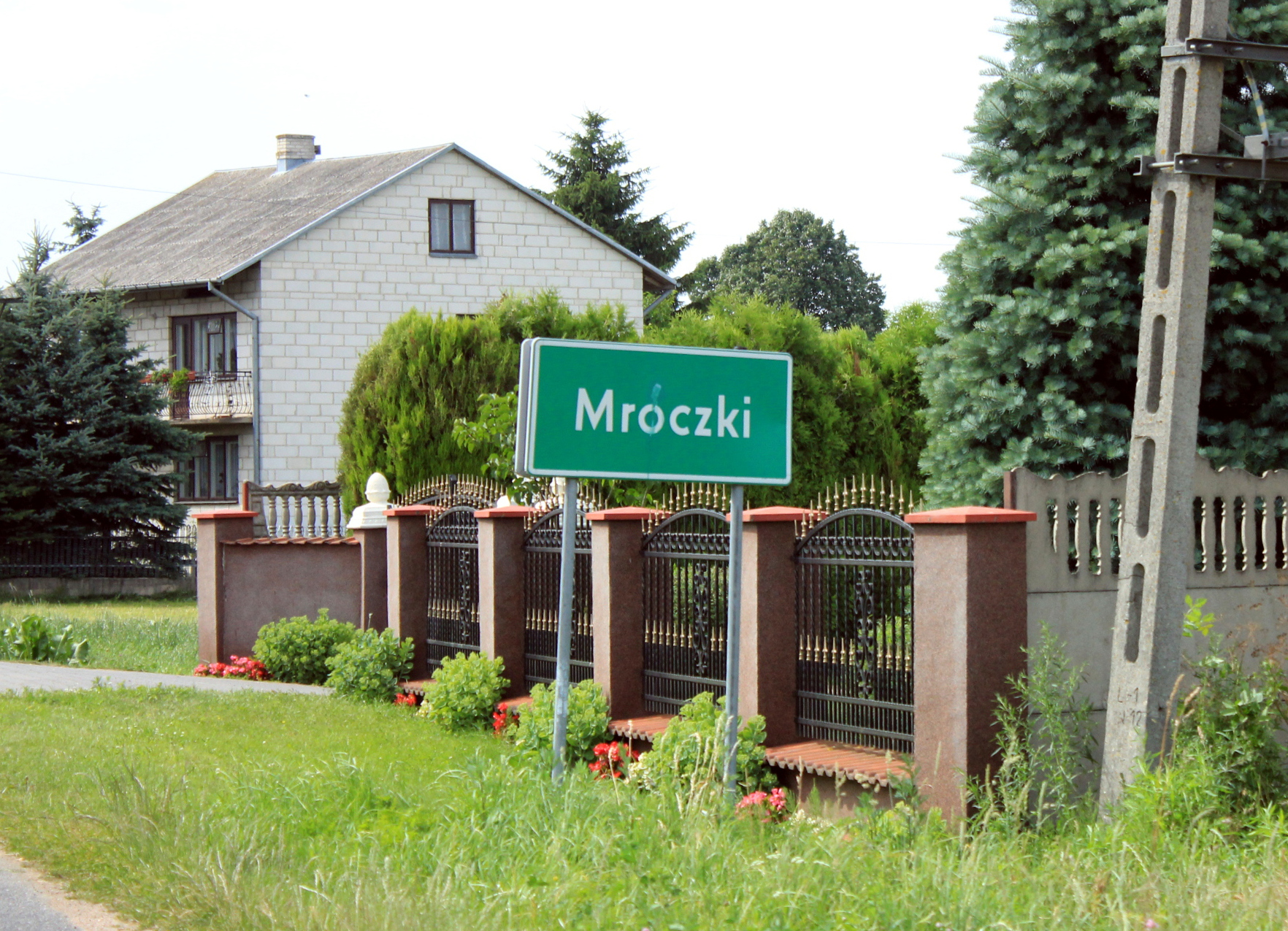

- Location within Poland
- Coordinates: 52°02′00″N 22°14′58″E
- Country: Poland
- Voivodeship: Masovian
- County: Siedlce
- Gmina: Wiśniew
- Population: 259

Mroczki (Polish pronunciation: [ˈmrɔt͡ʂkʲi]) is a village in the administrative district of Gmina Wiśniew, within Siedlce County, Masovian Voivodeship, in east-central Poland.
