= Gmina Skórzec =

Gmina Skórzec Skórzec Commune
- Gmina
- Coat of arms
- Interactive map of Gmina Skórzec
- Coordinates (Skórzec): 52°7′N 22°8′E
- Country: Poland
- Voivodeship: Masovian
- County: Siedlce County
- Seat: Skórzec

Area
  - Total: 118.91 km^{2} (45.91 sq mi)

Population (2014)
  - Total: 7,696
  - Density: 64.72/km^{2} (167.6/sq mi)
- Website: http://www.gminy.pl/skorzec

Gmina Skórzec is a rural gmina (administrative district) in Siedlce County, Masovian Voivodeship, in east-central Poland. Its seat is the village of Skórzec, which lies approximately 13 kilometres (8 mi) south-west of Siedlce and 77 km (48 mi) south-east of Warsaw.

The gmina covers an area of 118.91 square kilometres (45.9 sq mi), and as of 2006 its total population is 7,134 (7,696 in 2014).

== Villages ==
Gmina Skórzec contains the villages and settlements of Boroszków, Czerniejew, Dąbrówka-Ług, Dąbrówka-Niwka, Dąbrówka-Stany, Dąbrówka-Wyłazy, Dobrzanów, Drupia, Gołąbek, Grala-Dąbrowizna, Kłódzie, Nowaki, Ozorów, Skarżyn, Skórzec, Stara Dąbrówka, Teodorów, Trzciniec, Wólka Kobyla, Żebrak and Żelków.

== Neighbouring gminas ==
Gmina Skórzec is bordered by the gminas of Domanice, Kotuń, Siedlce, Wiśniew and Wodynie.
