= Stara Dąbrówka =

- Village
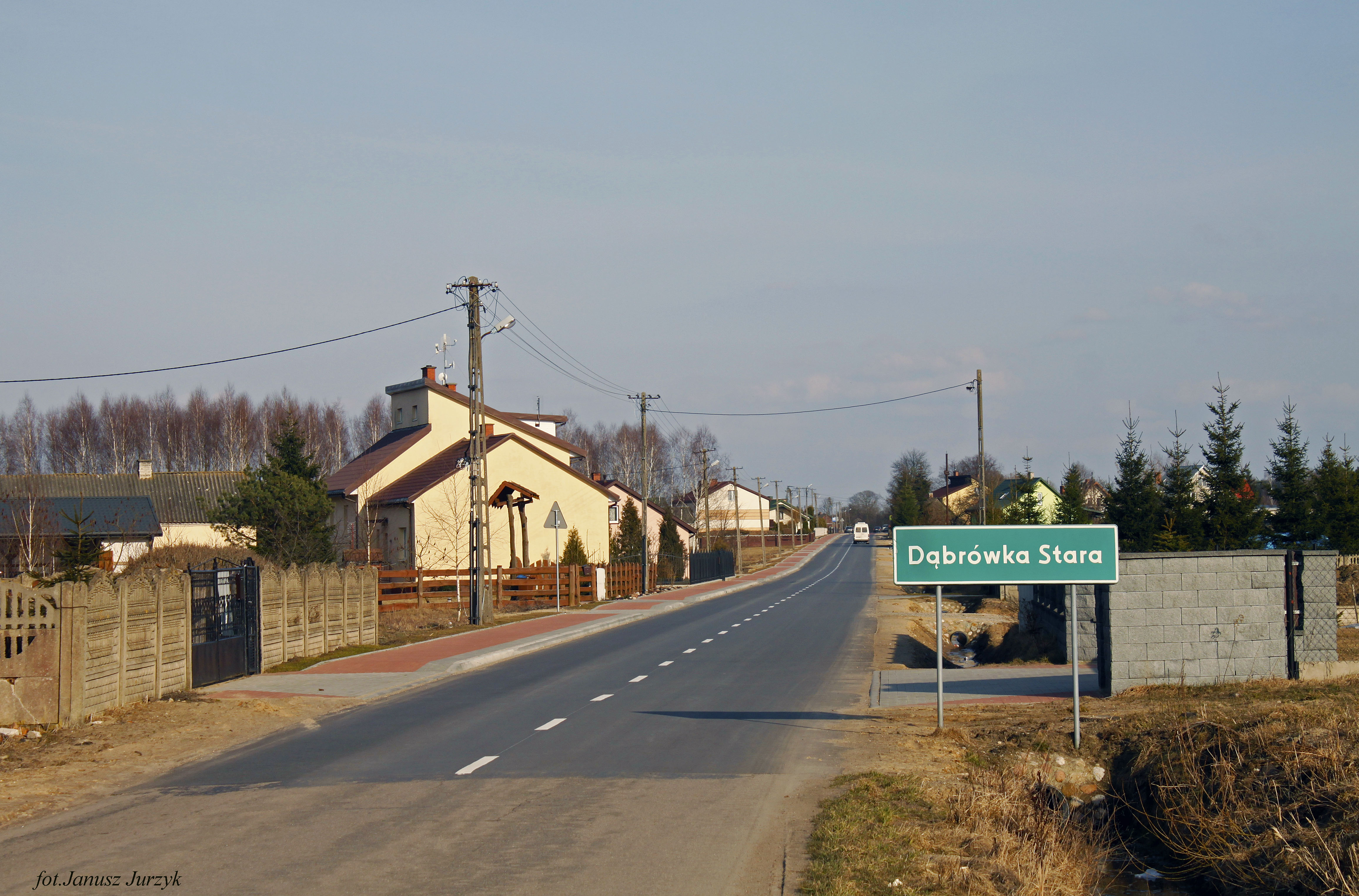

- Location within Poland
- Coordinates: 52°09′01″N 22°09′01″E
- Country: Poland
- Voivodeship: Masovian
- County: Siedlce
- Gmina: Skórzec

Stara Dąbrówka [ˈstara dɔmˈbrufka] is a village in the administrative district of Gmina Skórzec, within Siedlce County, Masovian Voivodeship, in east-central Poland.
