= Stok Wiśniewski =

- Village
- Location within Poland
- Coordinates: 52°6′6″N 22°14′19″E
- Country: Poland
- Voivodeship: Masovian
- County: Siedlce
- Gmina: Wiśniew
- Population: 141

Stok Wiśniewski [ˈstɔk viɕˈɲɛfski] is a village in the administrative district of Gmina Wiśniew, within Siedlce County, Masovian Voivodeship, in east-central Poland.
