= Mościbrody-Kolonia =

- Village
- Location within Poland
- Coordinates: 52°6′13″N 22°18′19″E
- Country: Poland
- Voivodeship: Masovian
- County: Siedlce
- Gmina: Wiśniew
- Population: 110

Mościbrody-Kolonia [mɔɕt͡ɕiˈbrɔdɨ kɔˈlɔɲa] is a village in the administrative district of Gmina Wiśniew, within Siedlce County, Masovian Voivodeship, in east-central Poland.
