= Daćbogi, Masovian Voivodeship =

Daćbogi
- Village
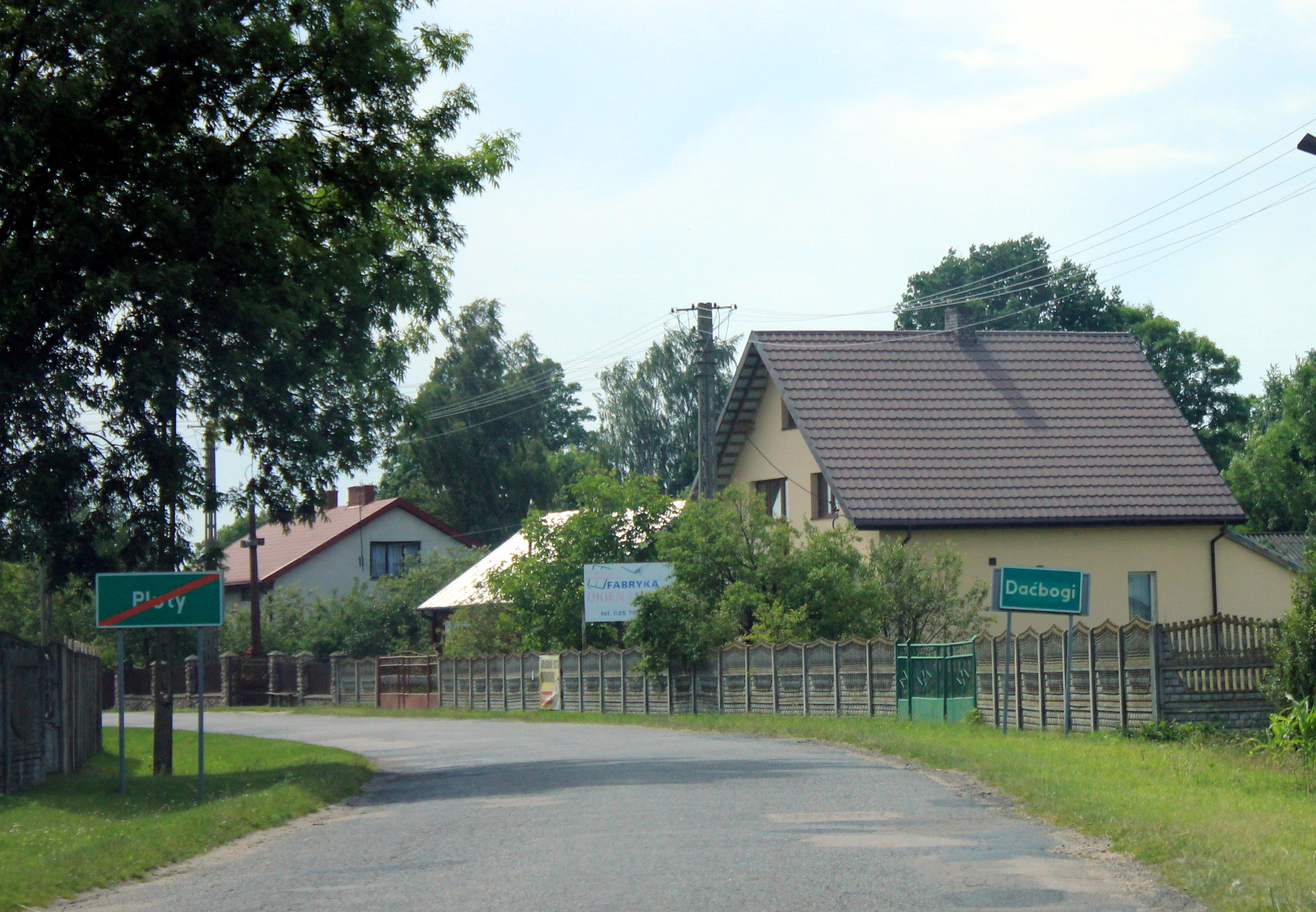

- Location within Poland
- Coordinates: 52°1′41″N 22°15′45″E
- Country: Poland
- Voivodeship: Masovian
- County: Siedlce
- Gmina: Wiśniew
- Population: 130

Daćbogi [dat͡ɕˈbɔɡi] is a village in the administrative district of Gmina Wiśniew, within Siedlce County, Masovian Voivodeship, in east-central Poland.
