= Drupia =

- Village
- Location within Poland
- Coordinates: 52°4′N 22°10′E
- Country: Poland
- Voivodeship: Masovian
- County: Siedlce
- Gmina: Skórzec

Drupia [ˈdrupja] is a village in the administrative district of Gmina Skórzec, within Siedlce County, Masovian Voivodeship, in east-central Poland.
