= Kłódzie =

- Village
- Location within Poland
- Coordinates: 52°6′N 22°2′E
- Country: Poland
- Voivodeship: Masovian
- County: Siedlce
- Gmina: Skórzec
- Population: 240

Kłódzie [ˈkwud͡ʑɛ] is a village in the administrative district of Gmina Skórzec, within Siedlce County, Masovian Voivodeship, in east-central Poland.
