= Dąbrówka-Wyłazy =

- Village
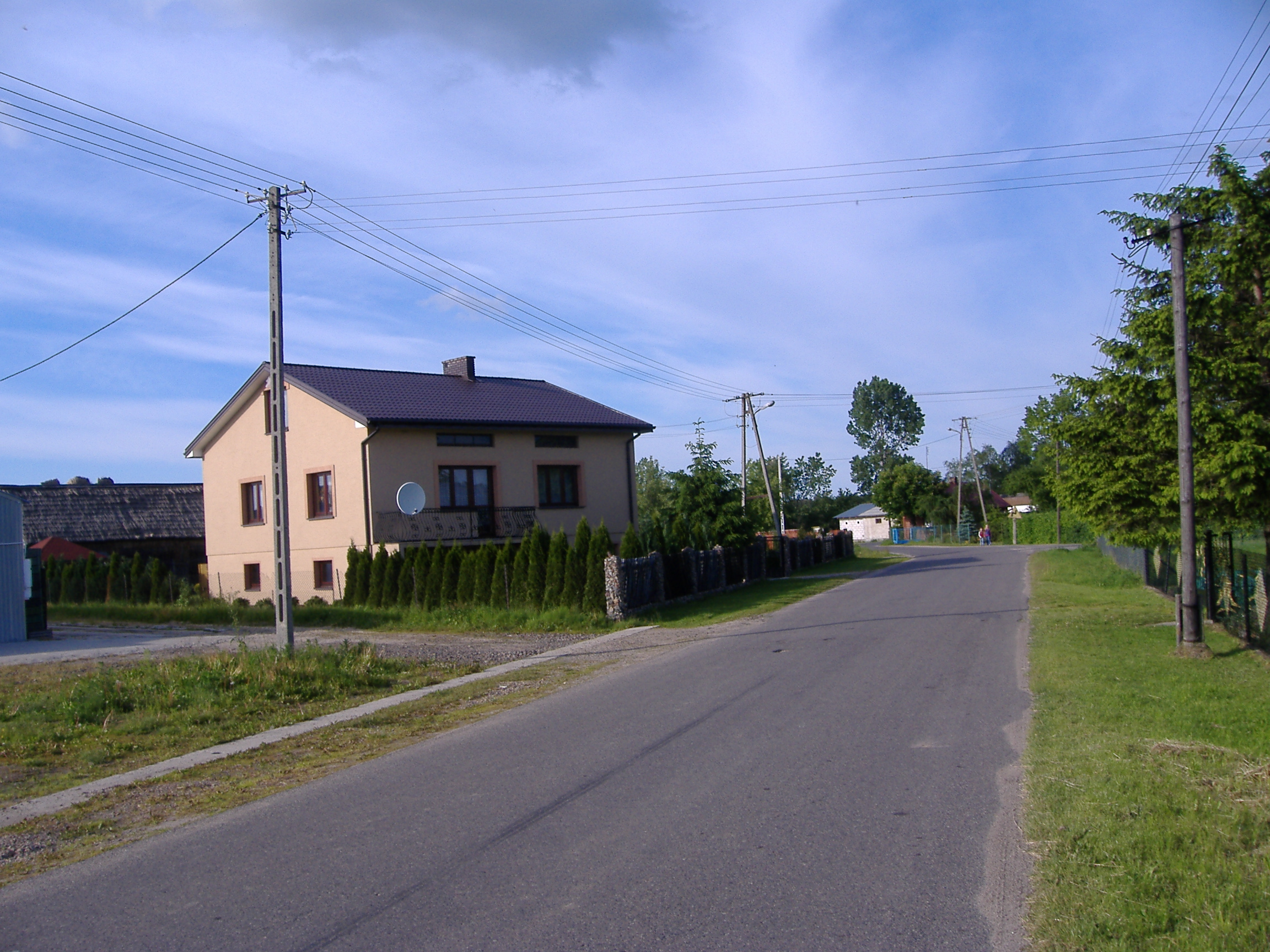

- Location within Poland
- Coordinates: 52°09′08″N 22°09′53″E
- Country: Poland
- Voivodeship: Masovian
- County: Siedlce
- Gmina: Skórzec
- Time zone: UTC+1 (CET)
  - Summer (DST): UTC+2 (CEST)

Dąbrówka-Wyłazy [dɔmˈbrufka vɨˈwazɨ] is a village in the administrative district of Gmina Skórzec, within Siedlce County, Masovian Voivodeship, in eastern Poland.

One Polish citizen was murdered by Nazi Germany in the village during World War II.
