= Skarżyn, Siedlce County =

Village in Gmina Skórzec, Poland

Skarżyn
- Village
- Location within Poland
- Coordinates: 52°06′57″N 22°01′01″E
- Country: Poland
- Voivodeship: Masovian
- County: Siedlce
- Gmina: Skórzec

Skarżyn [ˈskarʐɨn] is a village in the administrative district of Gmina Skórzec, within Siedlce County, Masovian Voivodeship, in east-central Poland.
