= Łupiny, Masovian Voivodeship =

Łupiny
- Village
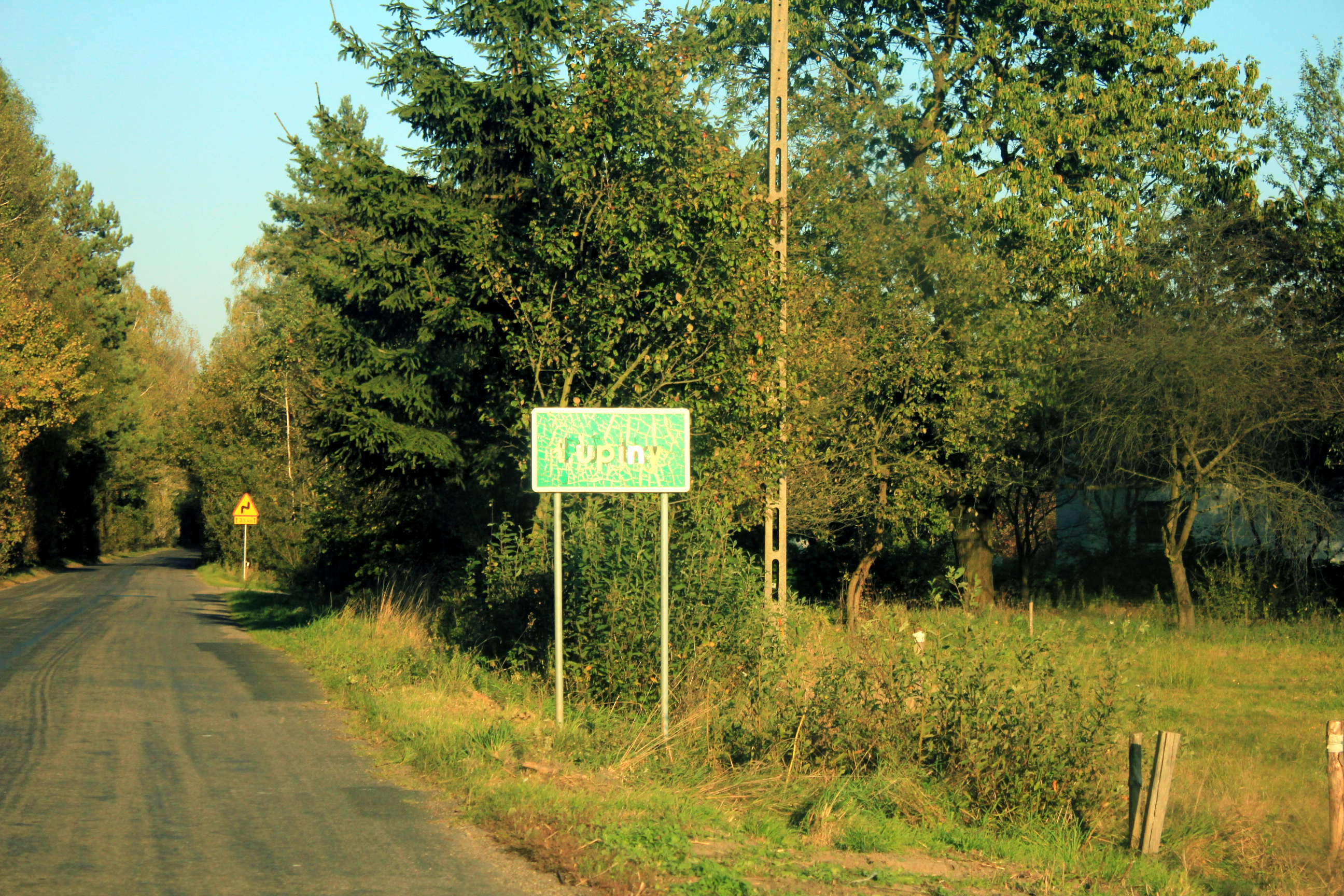

- Location within Poland
- Coordinates: 52°3′10″N 22°14′27″E
- Country: Poland
- Voivodeship: Masovian
- County: Siedlce
- Gmina: Wiśniew
- Population: 293

Łupiny [wuˈpinɨ] is a village in the administrative district of Gmina Wiśniew, within Siedlce County, Masovian Voivodeship, in east-central Poland.
