= Wiśniew-Kolonia =

- Village
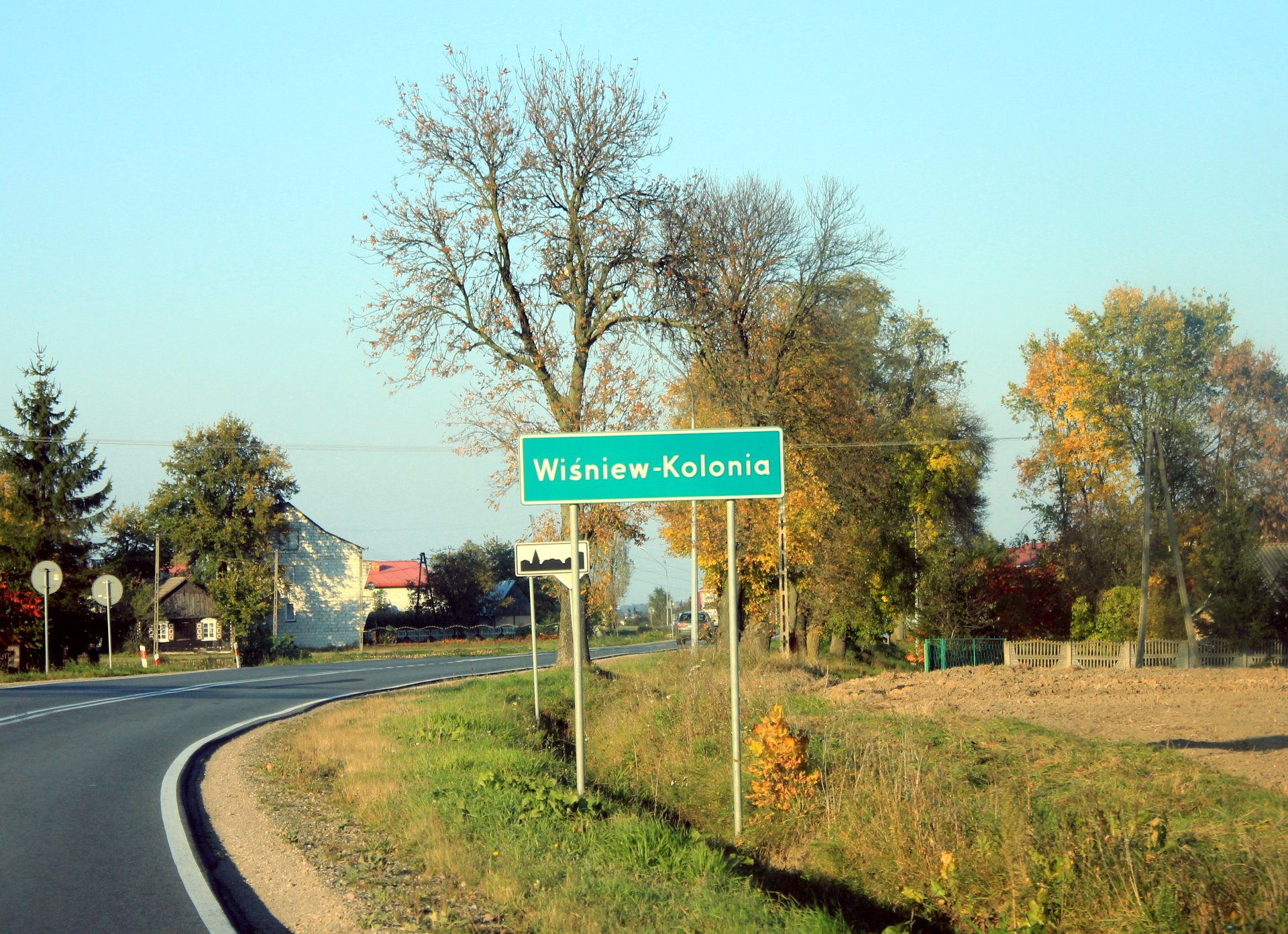

- Location within Poland
- Coordinates: 52°5′11″N 22°17′50″E
- Country: Poland
- Voivodeship: Masovian
- County: Siedlce
- Gmina: Wiśniew
- Population: 286

Wiśniew-Kolonia [ˈviɕɲɛf kɔˈlɔɲa] is a village in the administrative district of Gmina Wiśniew, within Siedlce County, Masovian Voivodeship, in east-central Poland.
