= Borki-Kosiorki =

- Village
- Location within Poland
- Coordinates: 52°6′11″N 22°19′11″E
- Country: Poland
- Voivodeship: Masovian
- County: Siedlce
- Gmina: Wiśniew
- Population: 154

Borki-Kosiorki [ˈbɔrki kɔˈɕɔrki] is a village in the administrative district of Gmina Wiśniew, within Siedlce County, Masovian Voivodeship, in east-central Poland.
