= Okniny-Podzdrój =

- Village
- Location within Poland
- Coordinates: 52°03′41″N 22°21′03″E
- Country: Poland
- Voivodeship: Masovian
- County: Siedlce
- Gmina: Wiśniew
- Population: 60

Okniny-Podzdrój [ɔkˈninɨ ˈpɔd͡zdrui̯] is a village in the administrative district of Gmina Wiśniew, within Siedlce County, Masovian Voivodeship, in east-central Poland.
