= Wólka Wiśniewska =

- Village
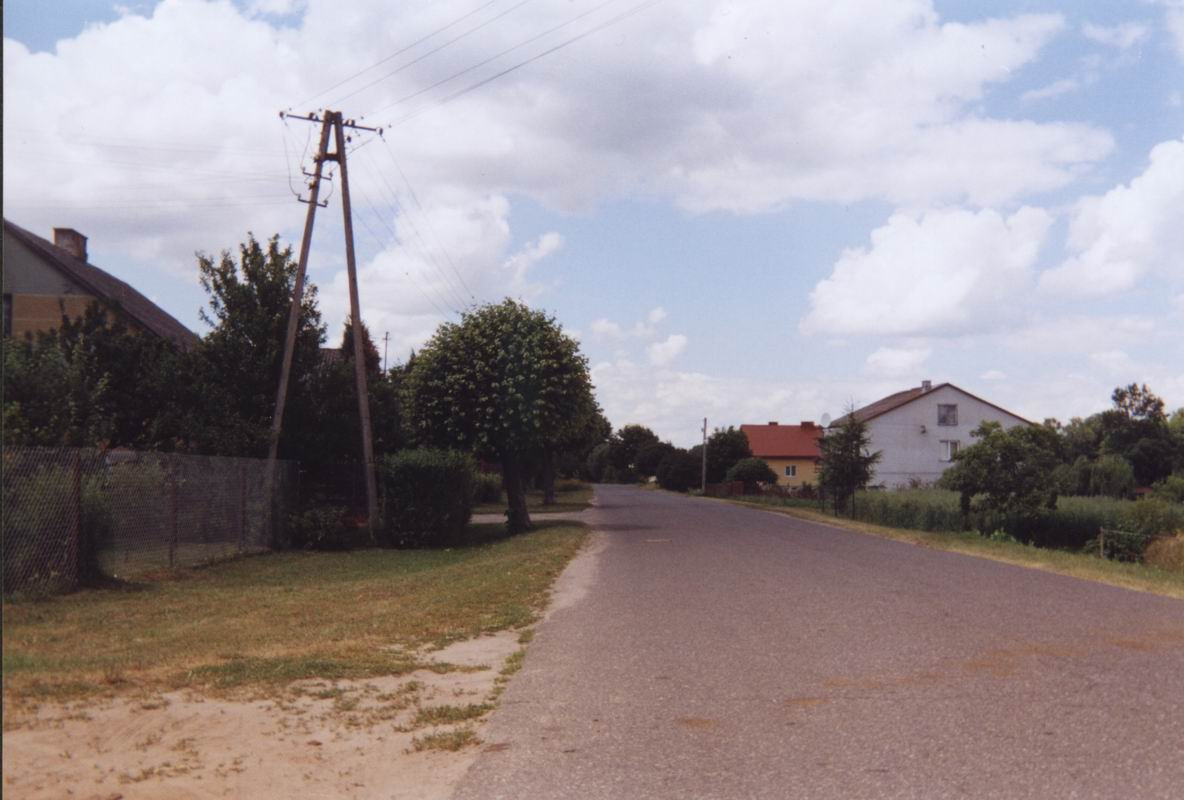

- Location within Poland
- Coordinates: 52°06′26″N 22°16′22″E
- Country: Poland
- Voivodeship: Masovian
- County: Siedlce
- Gmina: Wiśniew

Population
  - Total: 229

Wólka Wiśniewska [ˈvulka viɕˈɲɛfska] is a village in the administrative district of Gmina Wiśniew, within Siedlce County, Masovian Voivodeship, in east-central Poland.

From 1975 to 1998, the village was administratively part of the Siedlce Voivodeship. A volunteer fire brigade has operated in the village since 1963.
