= Gmina Wiśniew =

Gmina in Masovian Voivodeship, Poland

Gmina Wiśniew Wiśniew Commune
- Gmina
- Coat of arms
- Interactive map of Gmina Wiśniew
- Coordinates (Wiśniew): 52°4′20″N 22°17′37″E
- Country: Poland
- Voivodeship: Masovian
- County: Siedlce County
- Seat: Wiśniew

Area
  - Total: 125.87 km^{2} (48.60 sq mi)

Population (2014)
  - Total: 5,815
  - Density: 46.20/km^{2} (119.7/sq mi)
- Website: http://www.wisniew.pl

Gmina Wiśniew is a rural gmina (administrative district) in Siedlce County, Masovian Voivodeship, in east-central Poland. Its seat is the village of Wiśniew, which lies approximately 11 kilometres (7 mi) south of Siedlce and 90 km (56 mi) east of Warsaw.

The gmina covers an area of 125.87 square kilometres (48.6 sq mi), and as of 2006 its total population is 5,922 (5,815 in 2014).

== Villages ==
Gmina Wiśniew contains the villages and settlements of Borki-Kosiorki, Borki-Paduchy, Borki-Sołdy, Ciosny, Daćbogi, Gostchorz, Helenów, Kaczory, Lipniak, Łupiny, Mościbrody, Mościbrody-Kolonia, Mroczki, Myrcha, Nowe Okniny, Okniny-Podzdrój, Pluty, Radomyśl, Śmiary, Stare Okniny, Stok Wiśniewski, Tworki, Wiśniew, Wiśniew-Kolonia, Wólka Wiśniewska, Wólka Wołyniecka and Zabłocie.

== Neighbouring gminas ==
Gmina Wiśniew is bordered by the gminas of Domanice, Łuków, Siedlce, Skórzec and Zbuczyn.
