= Jan Zygmunt Skrzynecki =

Polish general (1787–1860)

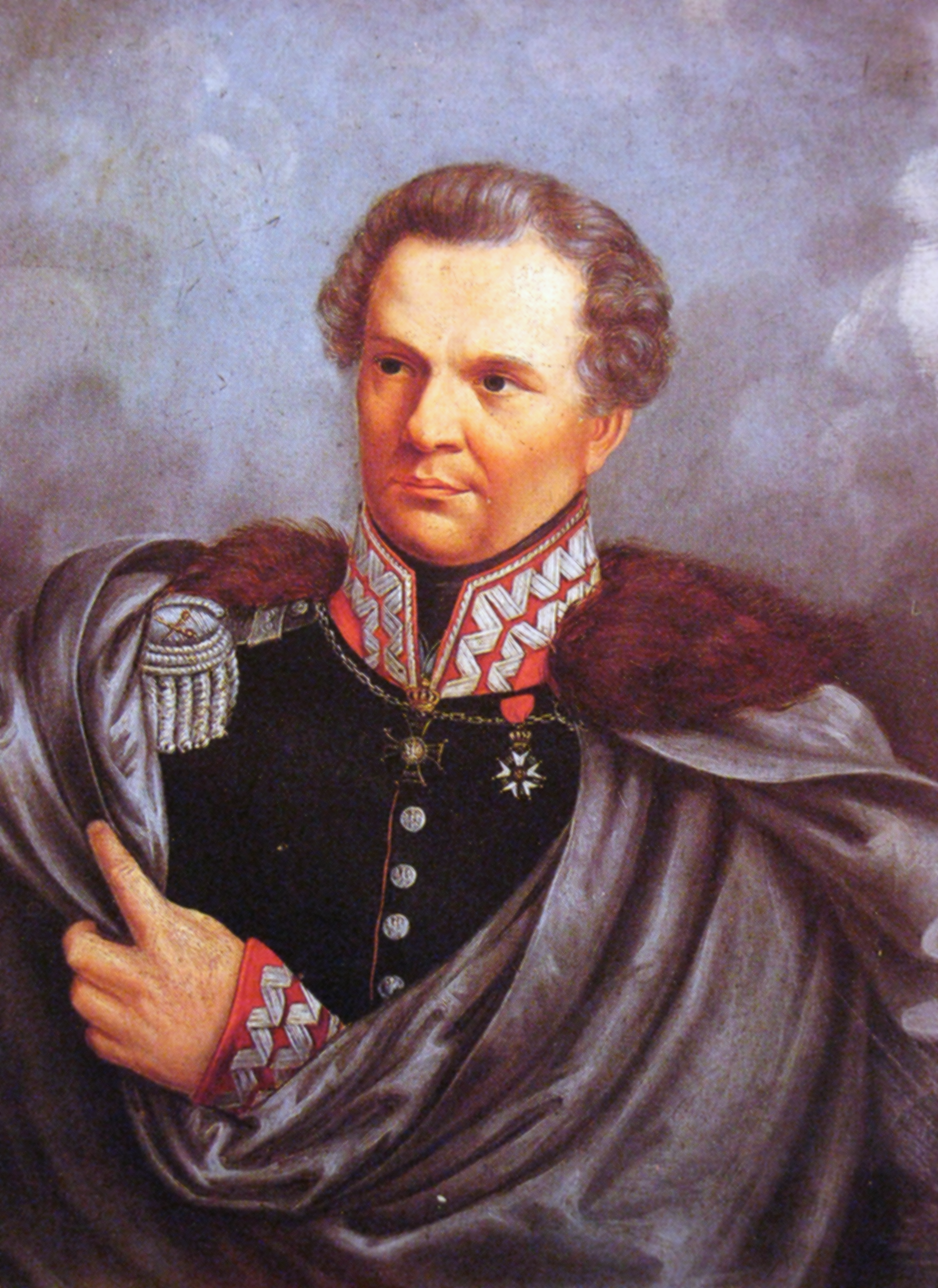
- Born: 8 February 1787; Żebrak
- Died: 12 January 1860 or 1 December 1860 (aged 72 or 73); Kraków

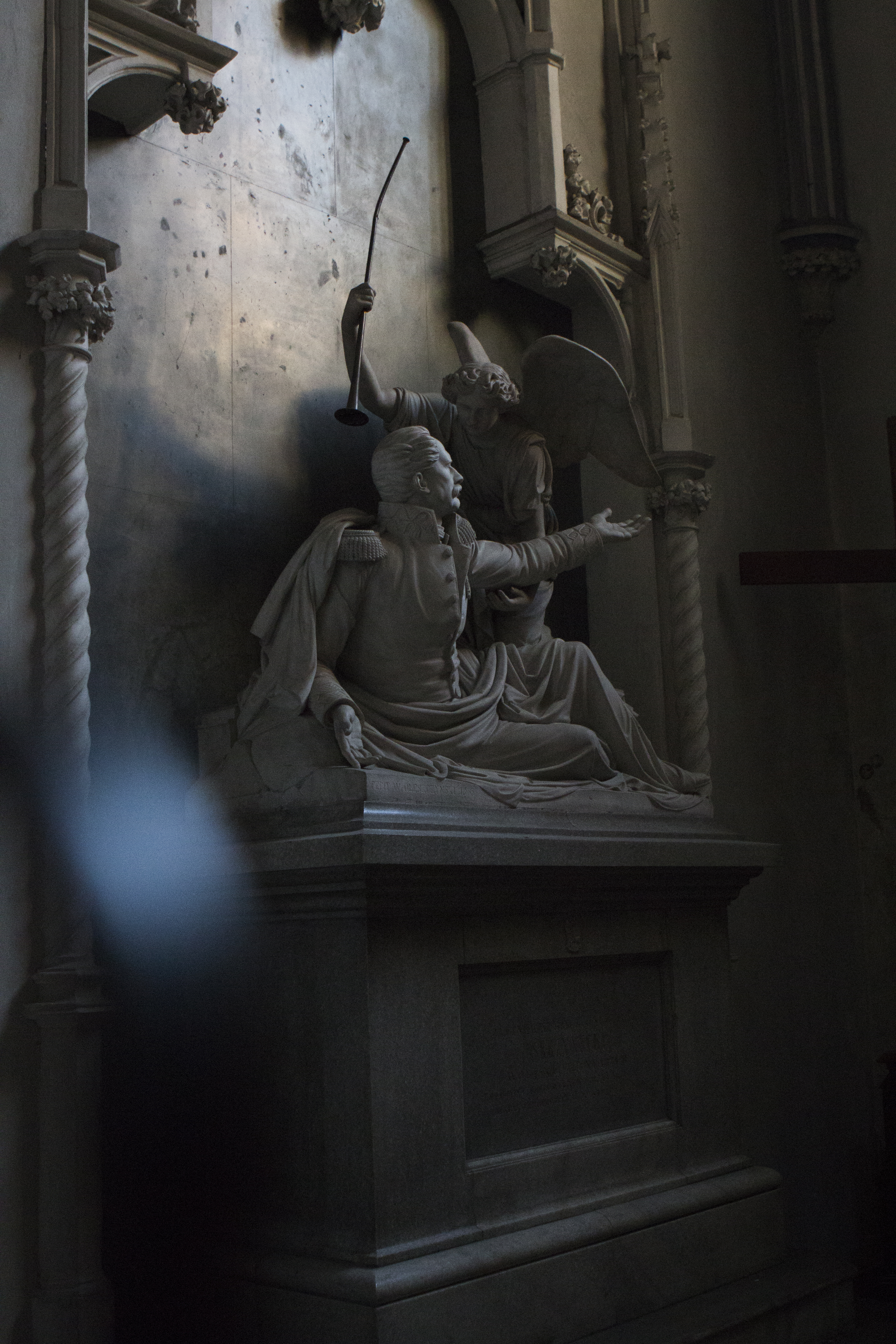
Grave of Jan Zygmunt Skrzynecki at the Holy Trinity Church in Kraków

Jan Zygmunt Skrzynecki (8 February 1787 – 12 January 1860 or 1 December 1860) was a Polish military officer who fought in the Napoleonic Wars and was commander-in-chief of the November Uprising in 1831.

== Biography ==
He was born in Żebrak, Siedlce County, in 1787, and completed his education at the Lwów University. After the formation of the Duchy of Warsaw in 1807, he entered the Polish Legion as a common soldier and won his lieutenancy at the Battle of Raszyn in 1809. At the Battle of Leipzig (1813) he greatly distinguished himself and at Arcis-sur-Aube, in 1814, he saved Napoleon from a sudden onslaught of the enemy by sheltering him in the midst of his battalion.

On the formation of the Kingdom of Poland in 1815 Skrzynecki was placed as Colonel in command of five infantry regiments of the line. On joining the insurrection of 1830 he was entrusted with the organization of the Polish forces. After the Battle of Grochow of February 1831 he superseded Prince Michał Gedeon Radziwiłł as commander in chief; but avoided all decisive operations as he hoped for the pacific intervention of the European powers in favor of Poland.

In the beginning of March 1831 he even entered into correspondence with the Russian Field-marshal Hans Karl von Diebitsch, who was taken very ill both at Paris and London. When at last Skrzynecki had to take the offensive his opportunity was gone, and he committed more than one tactical blunder. In the Battle of Ostrołęka (26 May 1831) he showed his usual valour and considerable ability, but after a bloody contest Diebitsch prevailed and Skrzynecki fell back upon Warsaw, where he demanded a reconstruction of the government and his own appointment as dictator. To this the Diet would not consent, although it gave Skrzynecki a vote of confidence.

But public opinion was now running strongly against him and he was forced on 10 August, in his camp at Bolimów, to place his resignation in the hands of his successor, Henryk Dembiński. Skrzynecki thereupon joined a guerrilla corps and on 22 September took refuge in Austrian territory. Subsequently, he resided at Prague, but migrated in 1839 to Brussels, where he was made commander in chief of the Belgian army, an appointment he was forced to resign due to the combined and emphatic protests of Russia, Austria and Prussia; however he remained in Belgium in active service until 1848. With the permission of the Austrian government he finally settled at Kraków, where he died in 1860.

Polish historian Jerzy Łojek claimed that Skrzynecki was a traitor who baffled all the national efforts.

== Honours and awards ==
- Golden Cross of the Virtuti Militari (1809)
- Knight's Cross of the Virtuti Militari (1812)
- Knight of the Legion of Honour (1813)
- Officier of the Legion of Honour (1814)
- Order of St. Anna, class II (1829)
- Commander's Cross of the Virtuti Militari (1831)
