= Gołąbek, Masovian Voivodeship =

Gołąbek
- Village
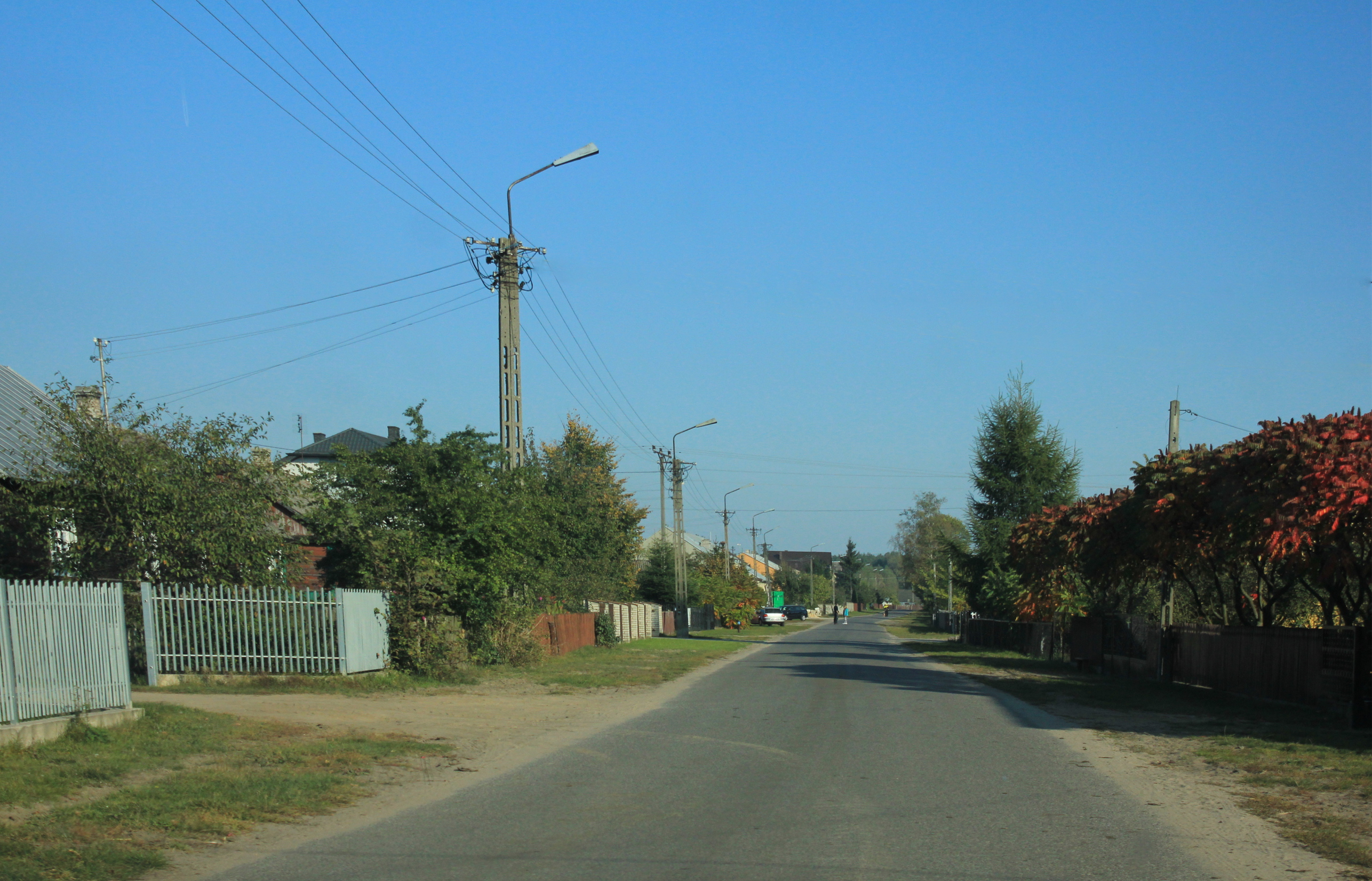

- Location within Poland
- Coordinates: 52°5′N 22°12′E
- Country: Poland
- Voivodeship: Masovian
- County: Siedlce
- Gmina: Skórzec

Gołąbek [ɡɔˈwɔmbɛk] is a village in the administrative district of Gmina Skórzec, within Siedlce County, Masovian Voivodeship, in east-central Poland.
