= Kaczory, Gmina Wiśniew =

Kaczory
- Village
- Location within Poland
- Coordinates: 52°3′8″N 22°16′54″E
- Country: Poland
- Voivodeship: Masovian
- County: Siedlce
- Gmina: Wiśniew
- Population: 148

Kaczory [kaˈt͡ʂɔrɨ] is a village in the administrative district of Gmina Wiśniew, within Siedlce County, Masovian Voivodeship, in east-central Poland.
