= Gostchorz =

- Village
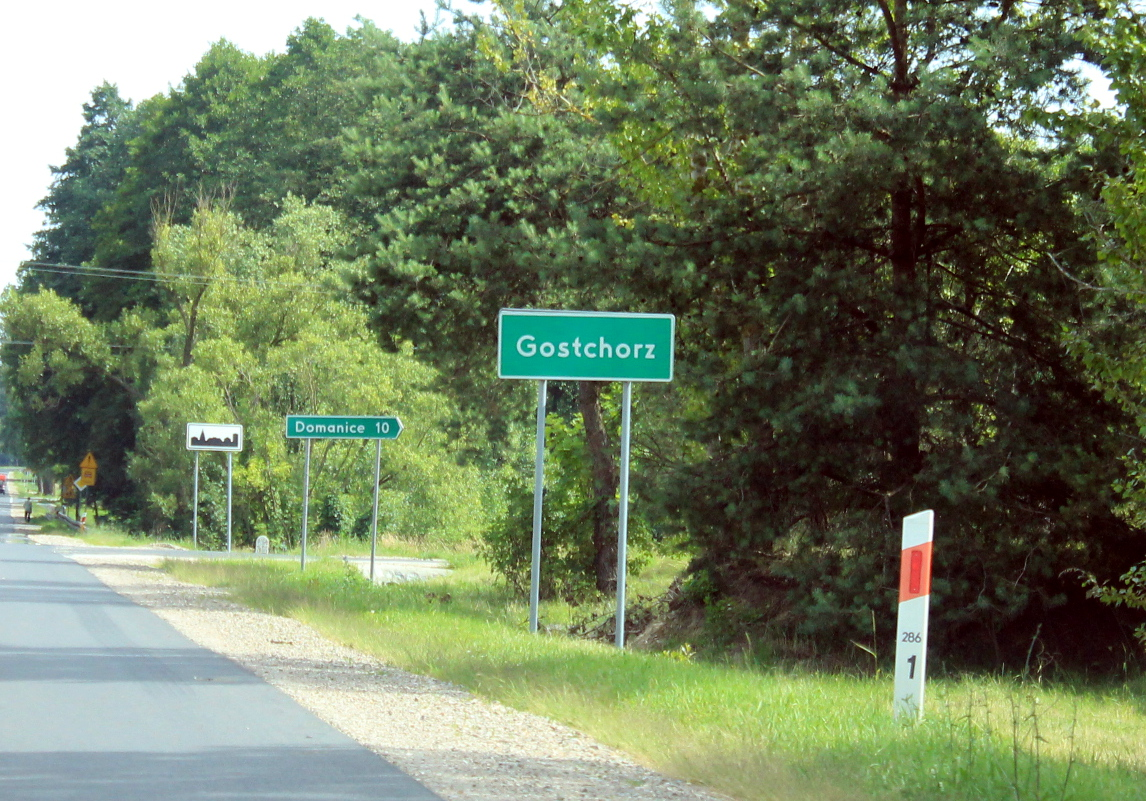

- Location within Poland
- Coordinates: 52°2′59″N 22°17′46″E
- Country: Poland
- Voivodeship: Masovian
- County: Siedlce
- Gmina: Wiśniew
- Population: 189

Gostchorz [ˈɡɔstxɔʂ] is a village in the administrative district of Gmina Wiśniew, within Siedlce County, Masovian Voivodeship, in east-central Poland.
