= Pluty, Gmina Wiśniew =

Pluty
- Village
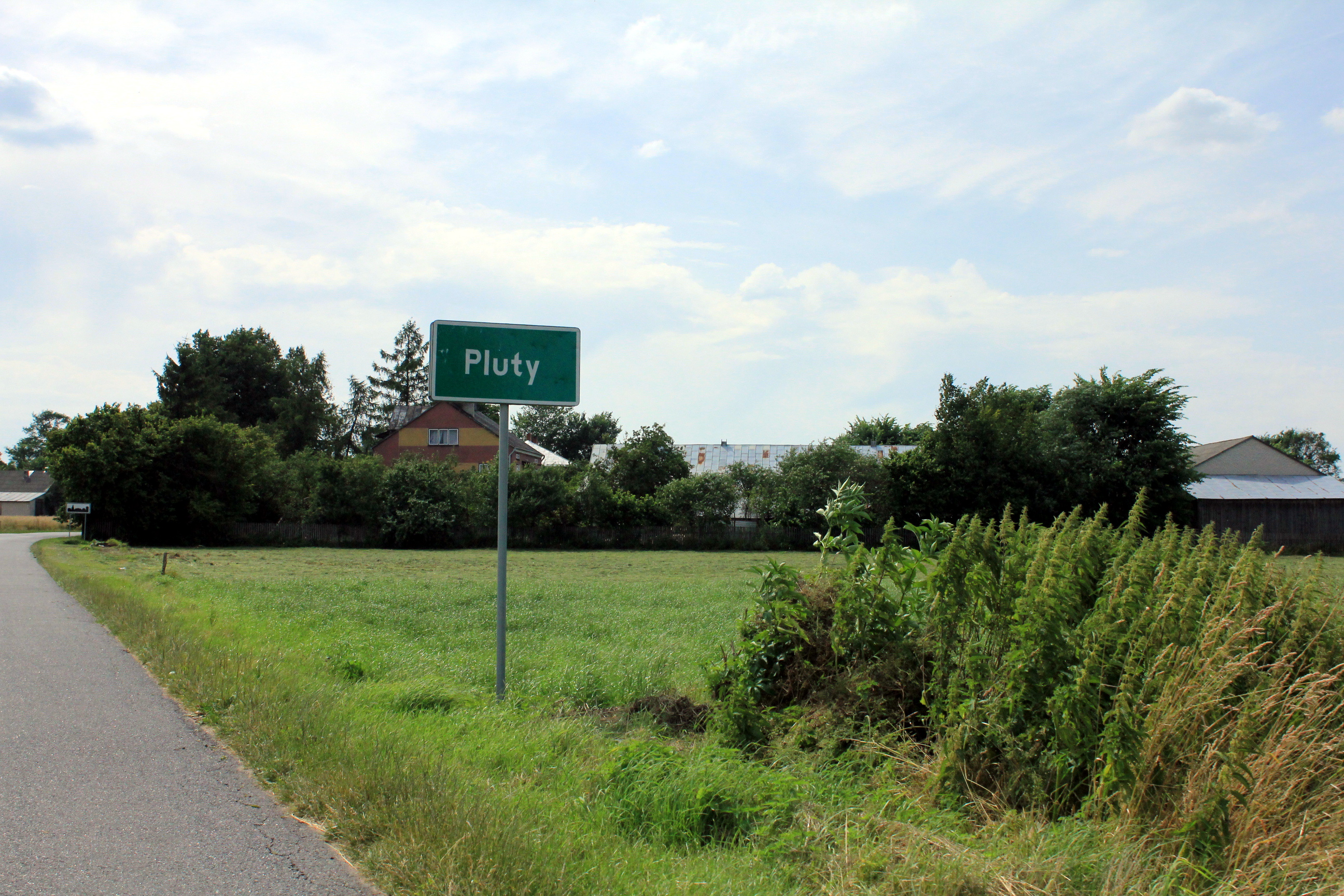

- Location within Poland
- Coordinates: 52°01′41″N 22°16′15″E
- Country: Poland
- Voivodeship: Masovian
- County: Siedlce
- Gmina: Wiśniew
- Population: 153

Pluty [ˈplutɨ] is a village in the administrative district of Gmina Wiśniew, within Siedlce County, Masovian Voivodeship, in east-central Poland.
