= Tworki, Siedlce County =

Tworki
- Village
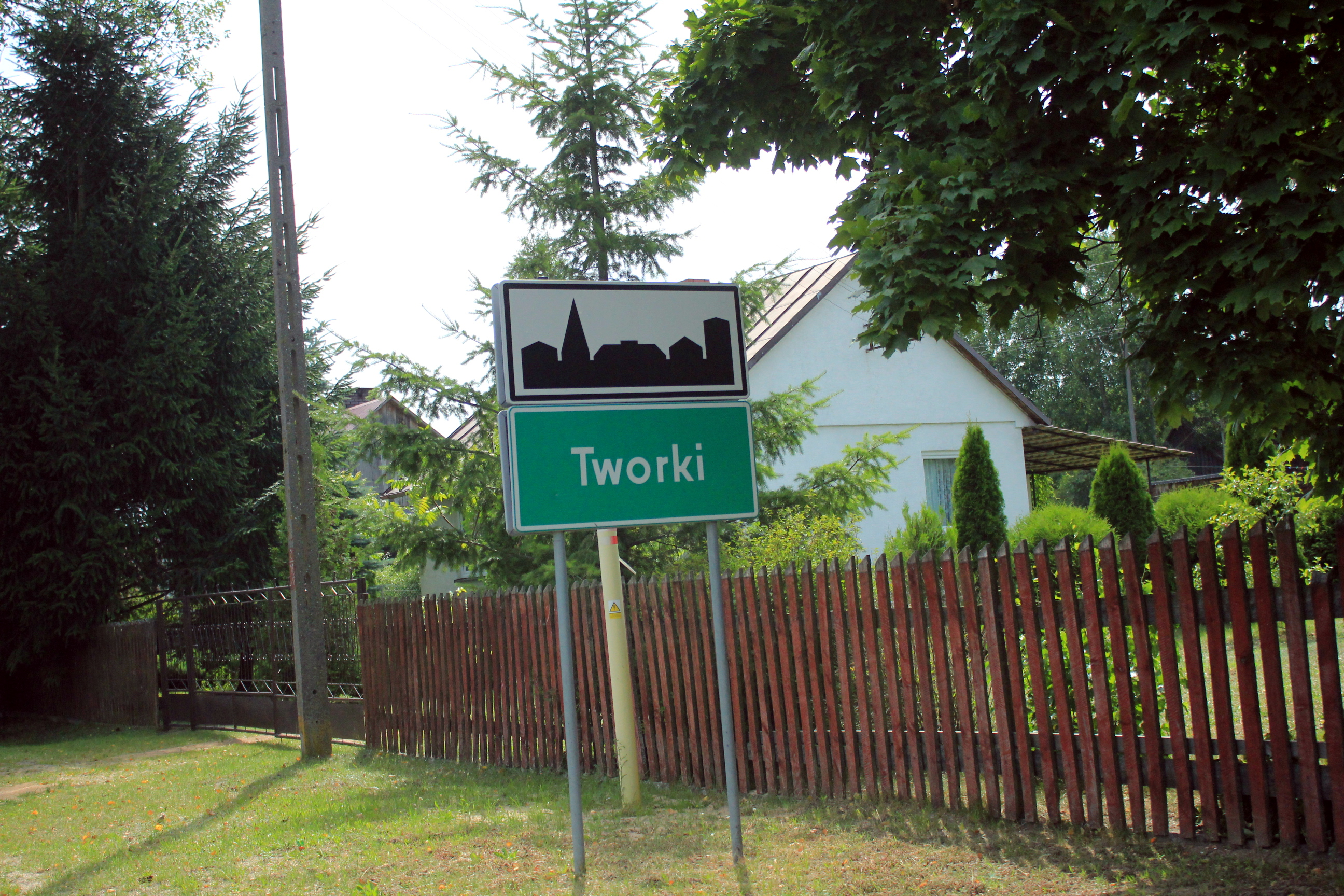

- Location within Poland
- Coordinates: 52°02′37″N 22°17′21″E
- Country: Poland
- Voivodeship: Masovian
- County: Siedlce
- Gmina: Wiśniew
- Time zone: UTC+1 (CET)
  - Summer (DST): UTC+2 (CEST)
- Vehicle registration: WSI

Tworki [ˈtfɔrki] is a village in the administrative district of Gmina Wiśniew, within Siedlce County, Masovian Voivodeship, in eastern Poland.

== History ==
Following the joint German-Soviet invasion of Poland, which started World War II in September 1939, the village was occupied by Germany until 1944. In January 1944, the German gendarmerie carried out a massacre of nine people in Tworki. The victims were 38-year-old Zofia Krasuska, her 5-year-old son Stanisław Krasuski, and seven Jews, whom she sheltered from the Holocaust.
