= Borki-Sołdy =

- Village
- Location within Poland
- Coordinates: 52°5′16″N 22°20′26″E
- Country: Poland
- Voivodeship: Masovian
- County: Siedlce
- Gmina: Wiśniew
- Population: 188

Borki-Sołdy [ˈbɔrki ˈsɔu̯dɨ] is a village in the administrative district of Gmina Wiśniew, within Siedlce County, Masovian Voivodeship, in east-central Poland.
