= Boroszków =

Village in Gmina Skórzec, Poland

- Village
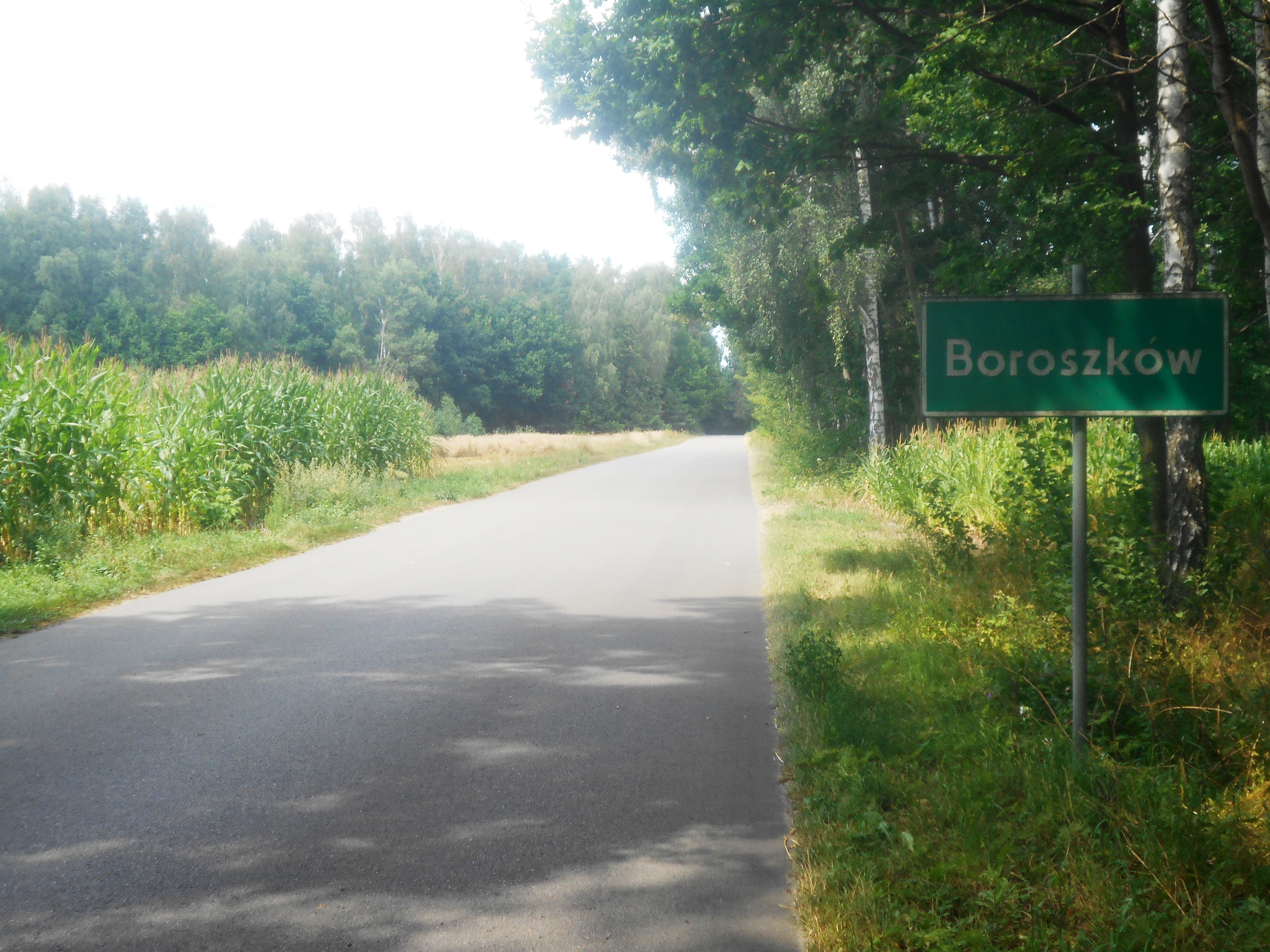
- Flag

- Location within Poland
- Coordinates: 52°07′58″N 22°07′34″E
- Country: Poland
- Voivodeship: Masovian
- County: Siedlce
- Gmina: Skórzec

Boroszków [bɔˈrɔʂkuf] is a village in the administrative district of Gmina Skórzec, within Siedlce County, Masovian Voivodeship, in east-central Poland.
