= Stare Okniny =

- Village
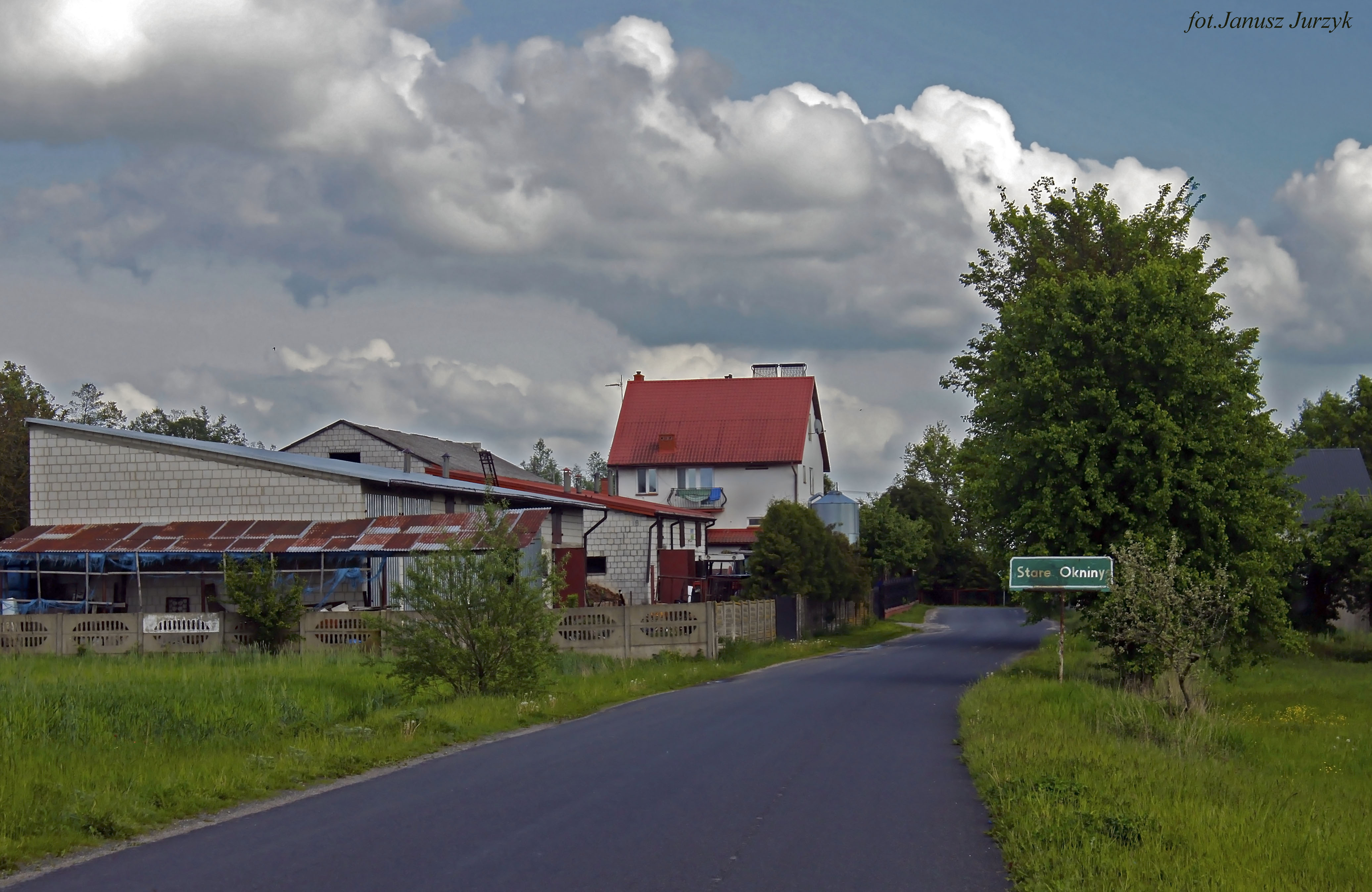

- Location within Poland
- Coordinates: 52°02′04″N 22°19′53″E
- Country: Poland
- Voivodeship: Masovian
- County: Siedlce
- Gmina: Wiśniew

Population
  - Total: 283

Stare Okniny [ˈstarɛ ɔkˈninɨ] is a village in the administrative district of Gmina Wiśniew, within Siedlce County, Masovian Voivodeship, in east-central Poland.
