= Nowe Okniny =

- Village
- Location within Poland
- Coordinates: 52°00′24″N 22°20′23″E
- Country: Poland
- Voivodeship: Masovian
- County: Siedlce
- Gmina: Wiśniew
- Population: 160

Nowe Okniny [ˈnɔvɛ ɔkˈninɨ] is a village in the administrative district of Gmina Wiśniew, within Siedlce County, Masovian Voivodeship, in east-central Poland.
