= Lipniak, Masovian Voivodeship =

Lipniak
- Village
- Location within Poland
- Coordinates: 52°5′N 22°12′E
- Country: Poland
- Voivodeship: Masovian
- County: Siedlce
- Gmina: Wiśniew
- Population: 152

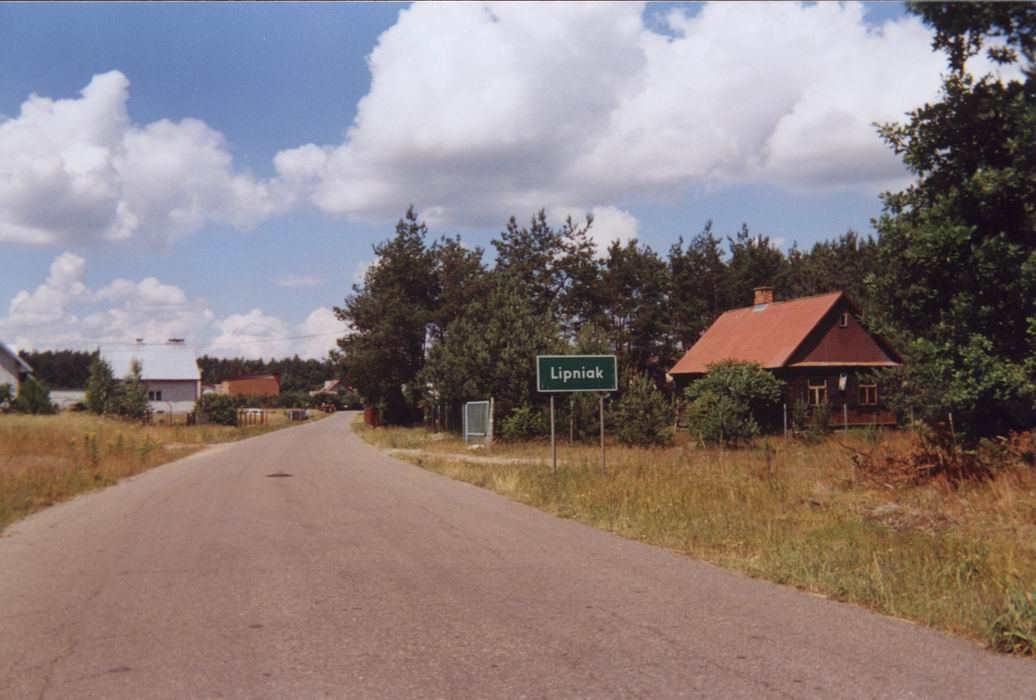
Lipniak

Lipniak [ˈlipɲak] is a village in the administrative district of Gmina Wiśniew, within Siedlce County, Masovian Voivodeship, in east-central Poland.
