= Borki-Paduchy =

- Village
- Location within Poland
- Coordinates: 52°5′17″N 22°20′53″E
- Country: Poland
- Voivodeship: Masovian
- County: Siedlce
- Gmina: Wiśniew
- Population: 475

Borki-Paduchy [ˈbɔrki paˈduxɨ] is a village in the administrative district of Gmina Wiśniew, within Siedlce County, Masovian Voivodeship, in east-central Poland.
