= Radomyśl, Masovian Voivodeship =

Radomyśl
- Village
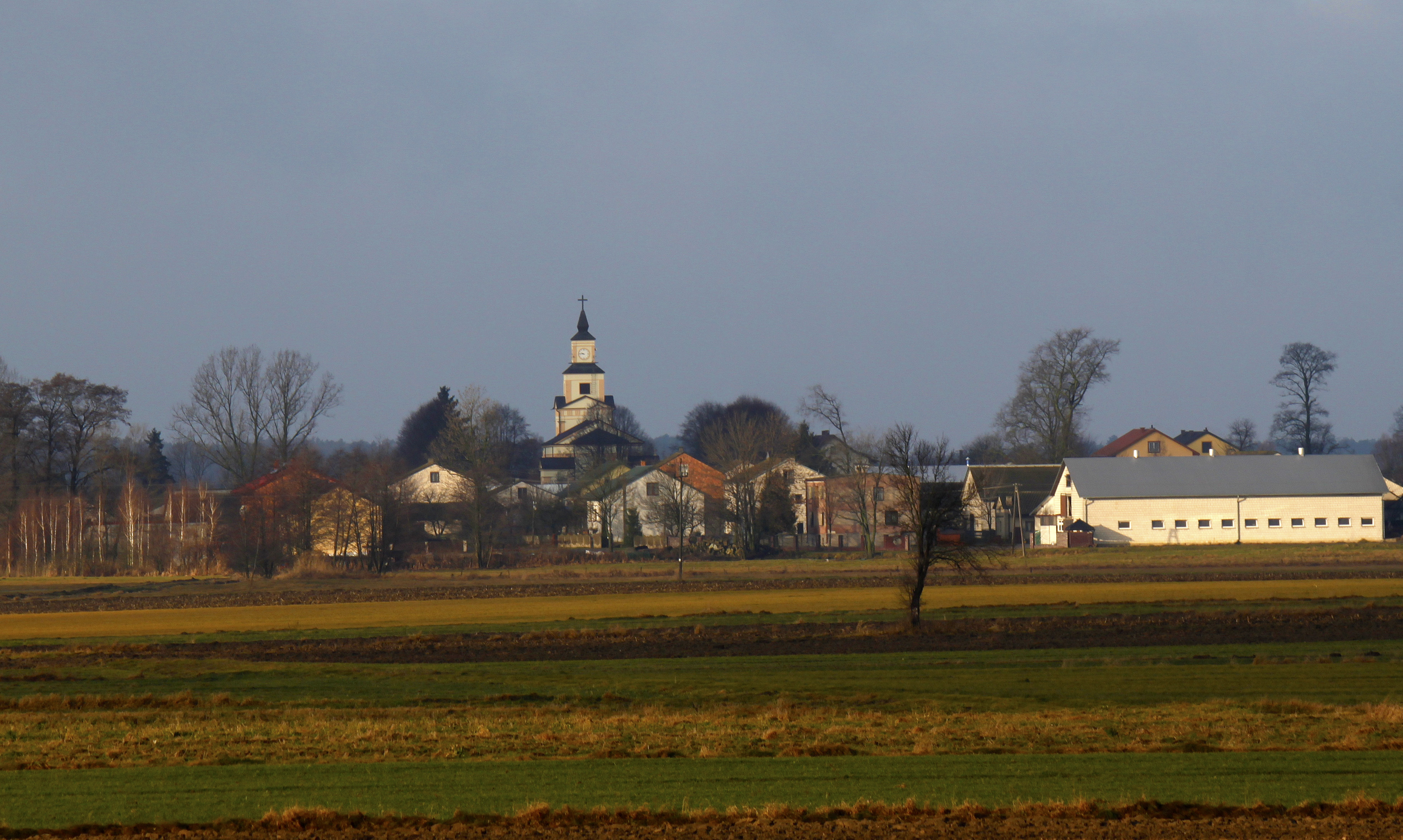

- Location within Poland
- Coordinates: 52°2′N 22°22′E
- Country: Poland
- Voivodeship: Masovian
- County: Siedlce
- Gmina: Wiśniew

Population
  - Total: 483
- Time zone: UTC+1 (CET)
  - Summer (DST): UTC+2 (CEST)

Radomyśl [raˈdɔmɨɕl] is a village in the administrative district of Gmina Wiśniew, within Siedlce County, Masovian Voivodeship, in east-central Poland.

Five Polish citizens were murdered by Nazi Germany in the village during World War II.
