= Trzciniec, Siedlce County =

Trzciniec
- Village
- Location within Poland
- Coordinates: 52°3′N 22°6′E
- Country: Poland
- Voivodeship: Masovian
- County: Siedlce
- Gmina: Skórzec
- Population (approx.): 480

Trzciniec [ˈtʂt͡ɕiɲɛt͡s] is a village in the administrative district of Gmina Skórzec, within Siedlce County, Masovian Voivodeship, in east-central Poland.
