= Helenów, Gmina Wiśniew =

Helenów
- Village
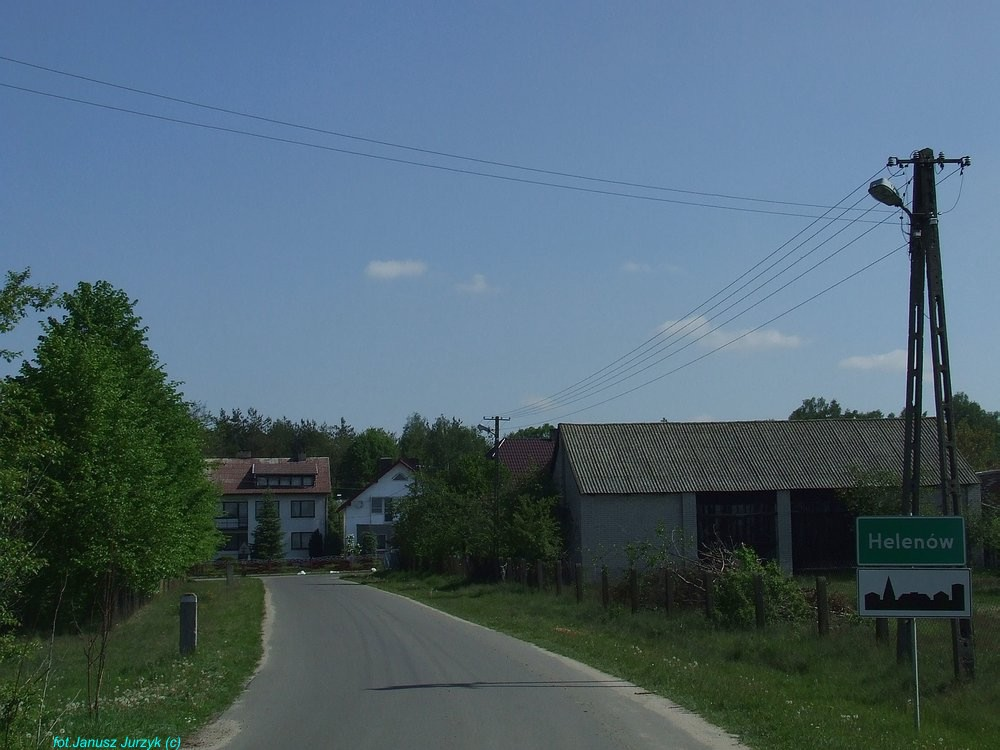
- Road sign Helenów

- Location within Poland
- Coordinates: 52°06′56″N 22°19′48″E
- Country: Poland
- Voivodeship: Masovian
- County: Siedlce
- Gmina: Wiśniew
- Population: 187

Helenów [xɛˈlɛnuf] is a village in the administrative district of Gmina Wiśniew, within Siedlce County, Masovian Voivodeship, in east-central Poland.
