= Wólka Wołyniecka =

- Village
- Location within Poland
- Coordinates: 52°07′24″N 22°14′46″E
- Country: Poland
- Voivodeship: Masovian
- County: Siedlce
- Gmina: Wiśniew
- Population: 123

Wólka Wołyniecka [ˈvulka vɔwɨˈɲɛt͡ska] is a village in the administrative district of Gmina Wiśniew, within Siedlce County, Masovian Voivodeship, in east-central Poland.
