= Dąbrówka-Ług =

Village in Masovian Voivodeship, Poland

- Village
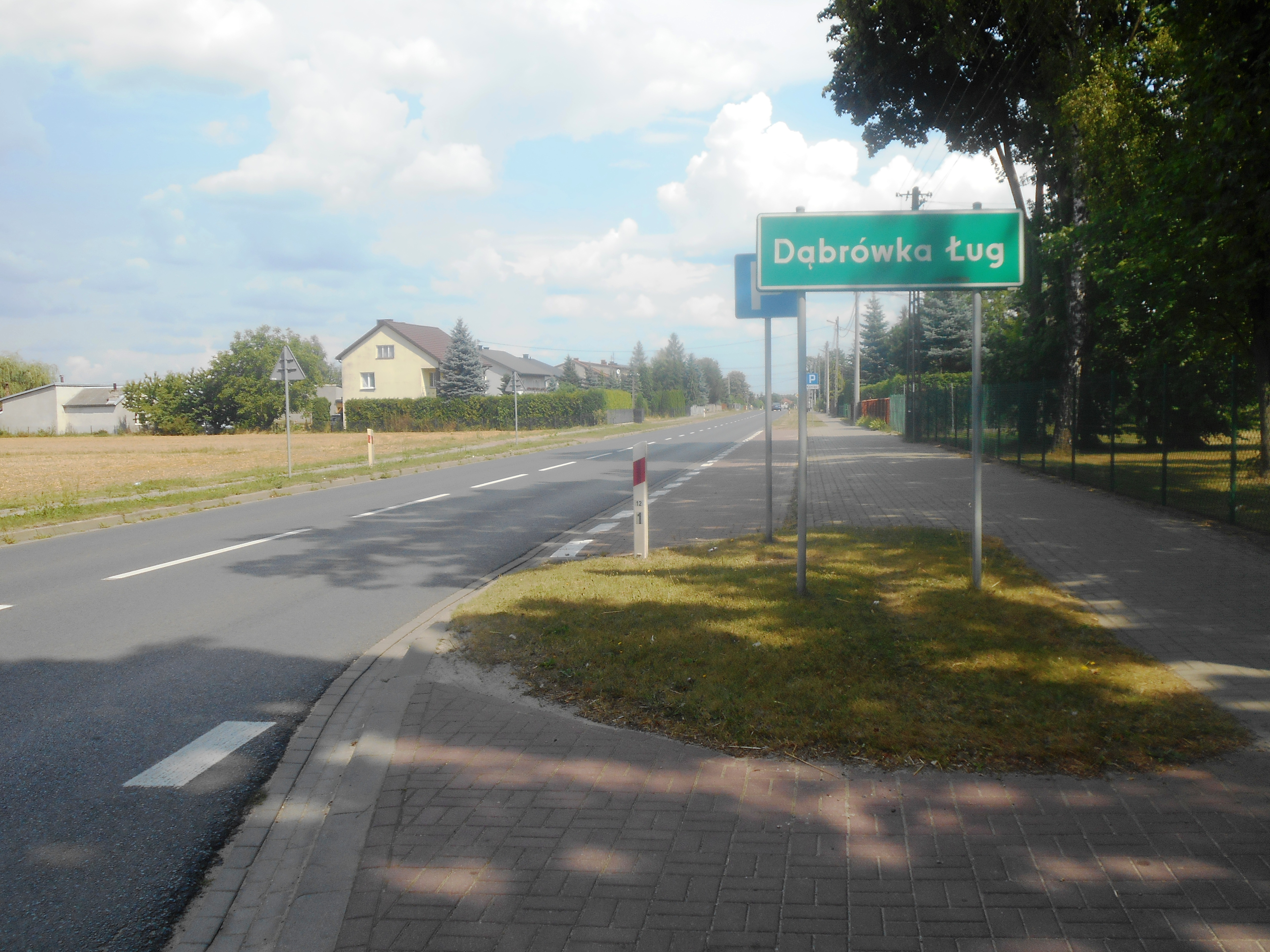

- Location within Poland
- Coordinates: 52°06′44″N 22°08′55″E
- Country: Poland
- Voivodeship: Masovian
- County: Siedlce
- Gmina: Skórzec

Population
  - Total: 830
- Time zone: UTC+1 (CET)
  - Summer (DST): UTC+2 (CEST)

Dąbrówka-Ług [dɔmˈbrufka ˈwuk] is a village in the administrative district of Gmina Skórzec, within Siedlce County, Masovian Voivodeship, in eastern Poland.

Eight Polish citizens were murdered by Nazi Germany in the village during World War II.
