= Dąbrówka-Stany =

Village in Gmina Skórzec, Poland

- Village
- Location within Poland
- Coordinates: 52°06′41″N 22°05′42″E
- Country: Poland
- Voivodeship: Masovian
- County: Siedlce
- Gmina: Skórzec

Population
  - Total: 710
- Time zone: UTC+1 (CET)
  - Summer (DST): UTC+2 (CEST)

Dąbrówka-Stany [dɔmˈbrufka ˈstanɨ] is a village in the administrative district of Gmina Skórzec, within Siedlce County, Masovian Voivodeship, in east-central Poland.

Five Polish citizens were murdered by Nazi Germany in the village during World War II.
