= Myrcha =

- Village
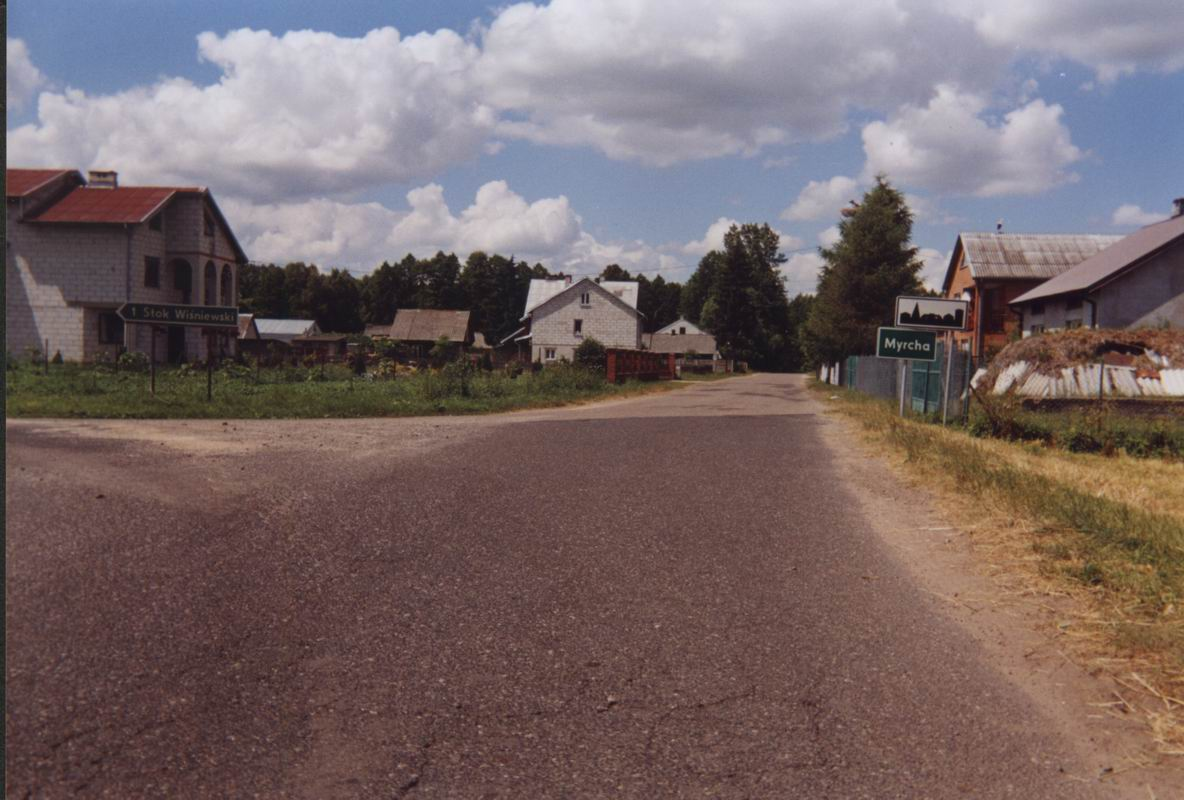

- Location within Poland
- Coordinates: 52°6′42″N 22°14′50″E
- Country: Poland
- Voivodeship: Masovian
- County: Siedlce
- Gmina: Wiśniew
- Population: 90

Myrcha [ˈmɨrxa] is a village in the administrative district of Gmina Wiśniew, within Siedlce County, Masovian Voivodeship, in east-central Poland.
