= Wiśniew, Siedlce County =

Wiśniew
- Village
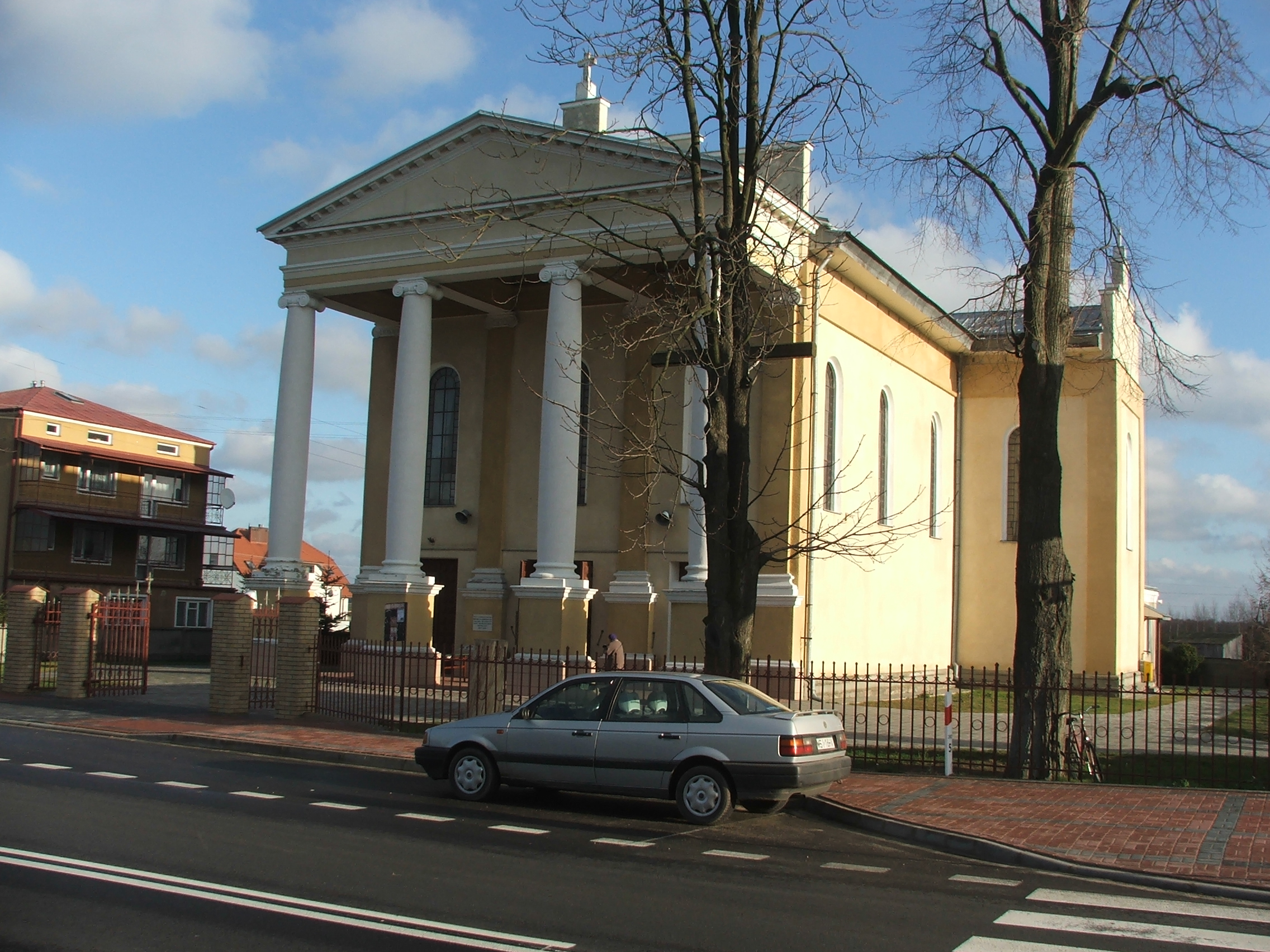
- Roman Catholic church

- Location within Poland
- Coordinates: 52°4′20″N 22°17′37″E
- Country: Poland
- Voivodeship: Masovian
- County: Siedlce
- Gmina: Wiśniew
- Population: 870

Wiśniew [ˈviɕɲɛf] is a village in Siedlce County, Masovian Voivodeship, in east-central Poland. It is the seat of the gmina (administrative district) called Gmina Wiśniew.
