= Żebrak =

- Village
- Location within Poland
- Coordinates: 52°4′N 22°5′E
- Country: Poland
- Voivodeship: Masovian
- County: Siedlce
- Gmina: Skórzec

Żebrak [ˈʐɛbrak] is a village in the administrative district of Gmina Skórzec, within Siedlce County, Masovian Voivodeship, in east-central Poland.

The name of the village means "beggar" in Polish.

Polish general Jan Zygmunt Skrzynecki was born in Żebrak in 1787.
