= Żelków =

- Village
- Location within Poland
- Coordinates: 52°8′49″N 22°11′20″E
- Country: Poland
- Voivodeship: Masovian
- County: Siedlce
- Gmina: Skórzec

Żelków [ˈʐɛlkuf] is a village in the administrative district of Gmina Skórzec, within Siedlce County, Masovian Voivodeship, in east-central Poland.
