= Dąbrówka-Niwka =

Village in Gmina Skórzec, Poland

- Village
- Location within Poland
- Coordinates: 52°08′42″N 22°08′18″E
- Country: Poland
- Voivodeship: Masovian
- County: Siedlce
- Gmina: Skórzec

Dąbrówka-Niwka [dɔmˈbrufka ˈnifka] is a village in the administrative district of Gmina Skórzec, within Siedlce County, Masovian Voivodeship, in east-central Poland.
