= Jerzy Szymanek =

Polish politician (1937–2026)

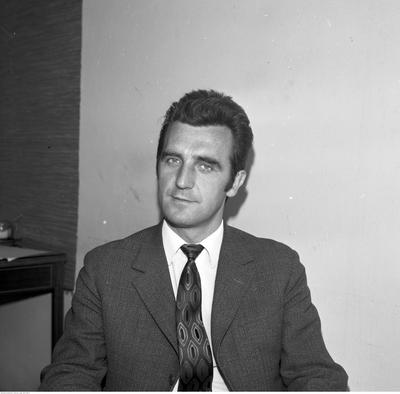
- Portrait of Szymanek by Grażyna Rutowska, 1976. From the collections of the NAC

Member of the Sejm
- In office 28 March 1972 – 31 July 1985

Personal details
- Born: Jerzy Piotr Szymanek; 11 April 1937 Ręczno, Poland
- Died: 8 March 2026 (aged 88) Warsaw, Poland
- Party: ZSL
- Education: University of Warsaw
- Occupation: Journalist

Jerzy Piotr Szymanek (11 April 1937 – 8 March 2026) was a Polish politician. A member of the United People's Party, he served in the Sejm from 1972 to 1985.

Szymanek died on 8 March 2026, at the age of 88.
