= Skórzec, Masovian Voivodeship =

Skórzec
- Village
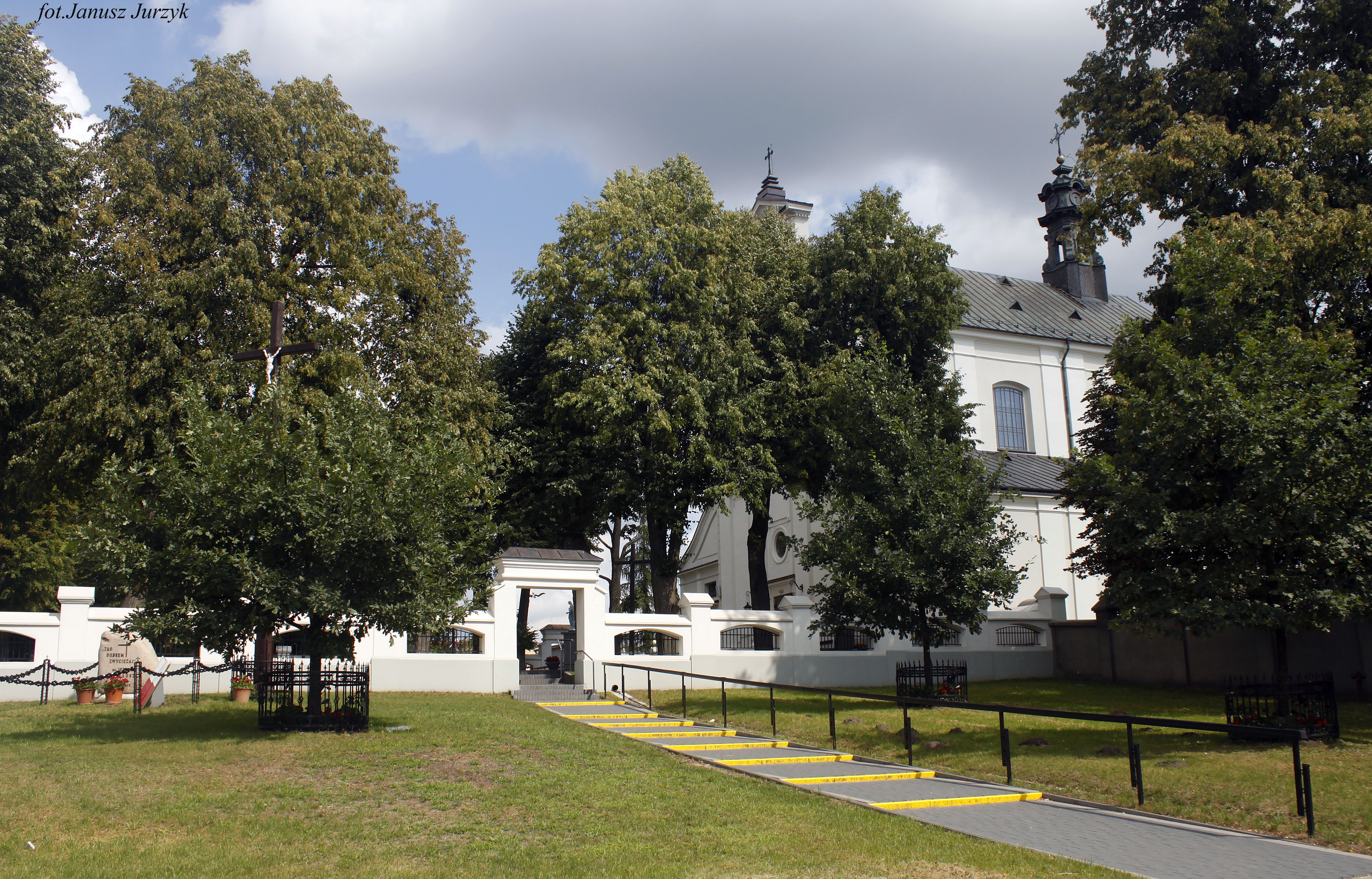

- Location within Poland
- Coordinates: 52°7′N 22°8′E
- Country: Poland
- Voivodeship: Masovian
- County: Siedlce
- Gmina: Skórzec

Population
  - Total: 1,069
- Time zone: UTC+1 (CET)
  - Summer (DST): UTC+2 (CEST)

Skórzec [ˈskuʐɛt͡s] is a village in Siedlce County, Masovian Voivodeship, in eastern Poland. It is the seat of the gmina (administrative district) called Gmina Skórzec.

== History ==
Following the German-Soviet invasion of Poland, which started World War II in September 1939, the village was occupied by Germany until 1944. The local Polish police chief and two more Polish policemen from Skórzec were murdered by the Russians in the Katyn massacre in 1940.
