= Ciosny, Masovian Voivodeship =

Ciosny
- Village
- Location within Poland
- Coordinates: 52°4′N 22°20′E
- Country: Poland
- Voivodeship: Masovian
- County: Siedlce
- Gmina: Wiśniew

Population
  - Total: 142
- Time zone: UTC+1 (CET)
  - Summer (DST): UTC+2 (CEST)

Ciosny [ˈt͡ɕɔsnɨ] is a village in the administrative district of Gmina Wiśniew, within Siedlce County, Masovian Voivodeship, in east-central Poland.

Six Polish citizens were murdered by Nazi Germany in Chylin during World War II.
