= Nowaki, Masovian Voivodeship =

Nowaki
- Village
- Location within Poland
- Coordinates: 52°8′N 22°6′E
- Country: Poland
- Voivodeship: Masovian
- County: Siedlce
- Gmina: Skórzec

Nowaki [nɔˈvaki] is a village in the administrative district of Gmina Skórzec, within Siedlce County, Masovian Voivodeship, in east-central Poland.
