= Świniarów =

- Village
- Location within Poland
- Coordinates: 52°13′42″N 22°44′32″E
- Country: Poland
- Voivodeship: Masovian
- County: Łosice
- Gmina: Łosice
- Time zone: UTC+1 (CET)
  - Summer (DST): UTC+2 (CEST)

Świniarów [ɕfiˈɲaruf] is a village in the administrative district of Gmina Łosice, within Łosice County, Masovian Voivodeship, in eastern Poland.

Six Polish citizens were murdered by Nazi Germany in the village during World War II.
