= Lipno, Łosice County =

Lipno
- Village
- Location within Poland
- Coordinates: 52°20′2″N 22°48′46″E
- Country: Poland
- Voivodeship: Masovian
- County: Łosice
- Gmina: Platerów
- Population: 440

Lipno (Polish pronunciation: [ˈlipnɔ]) is a village in the administrative district of Gmina Platerów, within Łosice County, Masovian Voivodeship, in east-central Poland.

== History ==
The first mention of Lipno comes from 1486 when King Casimir IV Jagiellon gave Lipno someone named Pietruszek which was royal secretary. Lipno was originally a village on the edge of Białowieża Forest and near running through the nearby Sarnaki the Royal Route Krakow - Vilnius. Casimir's decision confirmed in 1525 by King Sigismund I the Old and Lipno until the 1864 was the village that belonged to the nobility. In the 80s 16th century Lipno was part of the "klimczycka group" consisting of three villages (Lipno, Klimczyce, Sarnaki) belonging to the family Kosiński. The period of the wars of the 17th century had a great impact on the history of the village. In memory of people, handed down from generation to generation, preserved picture of the struggle fought by a group of villagers from the Swedish troops during the Deluge. Lipno, from 1513 until 1795, was part of the set up by the decision of King Sigismund the Old, the capital of Podlaskie Voivodeship in Drohiczyn (from the Union of Lublin since 1569 area of the region became part of the Crown). After the Third Partition of Poland, southern part of the province, separated by the river Bug found since 1809 was under the rule of Austria. From 1809 Lipno and surroundings were part of the Duchy of Warsaw (created in 1807), since 1815 Lipno was for more than a century one of the many villages, formed the Congress of Vienna, the Polish Kingdom. In the 19th century the village belonged to the property Klimczyce owned by the family Podczaski. In 1827 there were 31 houses and 200 inhabitants, in 1880, 40 houses inhabited by 396 people during the procession in the 984 acres of land. In 1962, in the village inhabited by 530 people. Through the efforts of residents Lipno in 1910 was funded statue of Mary, the mother of Jesus set on the road leading to the Sarnaki. Figure was a place of prayers and meetings residents of the village. In 1933, the figure was in the middle of a newly built chapel on the same site. During the World War II in the area operated partisan included in the fifth Wilno Brigade AK, using the help of the local population, for which after the war, some residents were persecuted by UB. In Warsaw, Polish People's Party deputies filed parliamentary questions on harassment by UB population of the Gmina Sarnaki and village Lipno, which then belonged to this municipality.
