= Borsuki, Masovian Voivodeship =

Borsuki
- Village
- Location within Poland
- Coordinates: 52°16′31″N 23°6′1″E
- Country: Poland
- Voivodeship: Masovian
- County: Łosice
- Gmina: Sarnaki

Borsuki [bɔrˈsuki] is a village in the administrative district of Gmina Sarnaki, within Łosice County, Masovian Voivodeship, in eastern Poland. It lie sapproximately 16 km (10 mi) east of Sarnaki, 27 km (17 mi) east of Łosice, and 144 km (89 mi) east of Warsaw.
