= Bonino (surname) =

Bonino is an Italian surname. Notable people with the surname include:

- Angie Bonino (born 1974), Peruvian artist and graphic designer
- Emma Bonino (1948–2026), Italian politician
- Erik Bonino (born 1963), British businessman
- Ernesto Bonino (1922–2008), Italian singer
- Ernesto Bonino (footballer) (1899–1984), Italian footballer
- Giovanni Bonino (born c. 1922), Italian rugby player
- Giuseppina Gabriella Bonino (1843–1906), Italian Roman Catholic nun
- Guido Bonino (1931–2022), Italian politician
- José Míguez Bonino (1924–2012), Argentine theologian
- Julio César Bonino (1947–2017), Uruguayan Roman Catholic bishop
- Nick Bonino (born 1988), American ice hockey player
- René Bonino (1930–2016), French sprinter
- Serge-Thomas Bonino (born 1961), French Catholic theologian

== See also ==
- Bonin (surname)
- Bonine (surname)
- Bonini (surname)
- Bonino (disambiguation)
