= Lepki =

Lepki may refer to:

- Lepki people, an ethnic group who lives in Highland Papua, Indonesia
  - Lepki language, the language spoken by the Lepki people
- Stare Łepki, a village in Gmina Olszanka, Poland
- Nowe Łepki, a village in Gmina Olszanka, Poland
