= Mierzwice-Kolonia =

- Village
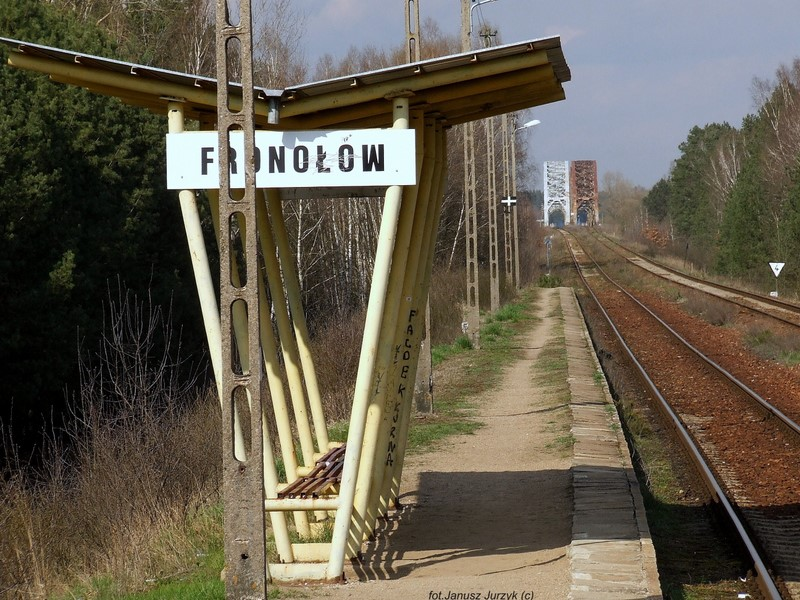
- Fronołów (train stop)

- Location within Poland
- Coordinates: 52°22′07″N 22°56′31″E
- Country: Poland
- Voivodeship: Masovian
- County: Łosice
- Gmina: Sarnaki

Mierzwice-Kolonia [mjɛʐˈvit͡sɛ kɔˈlɔɲa] is a village in the administrative district of Gmina Sarnaki, within Łosice County, Masovian Voivodeship, in east-central Poland.

This is the summer resort situated on the river Bug in Podlasie Bug Gorge Landscape Park. There was a resort of Polish State Railways here, now privately owned. Near the resort are numerous summer houses. The village is especially popular with the residents of Siedlce.

In the village is located the railway line between Siedlce and Czeremcha. One of the part of the line is Fronołów Railway Station. Under this common name of village it is known for holidaymakers and is popular as a Fronołów more than Mierzwice-Kolonia.

Fronołów name probably comes from the surname of Russian engineer - Fronolov who designed the steel railway bridge at this location.

== The railway bridge in Fronołów ==
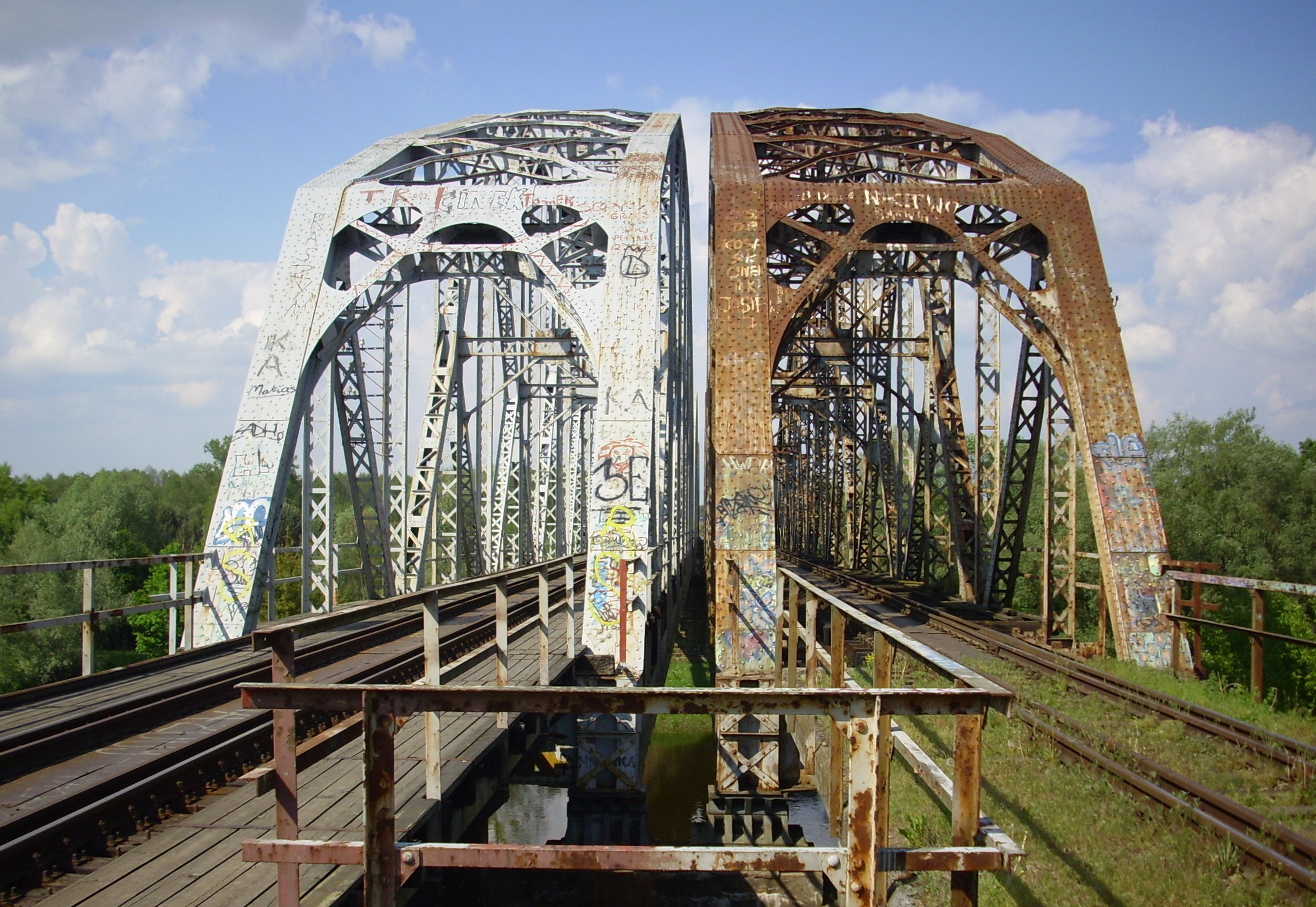

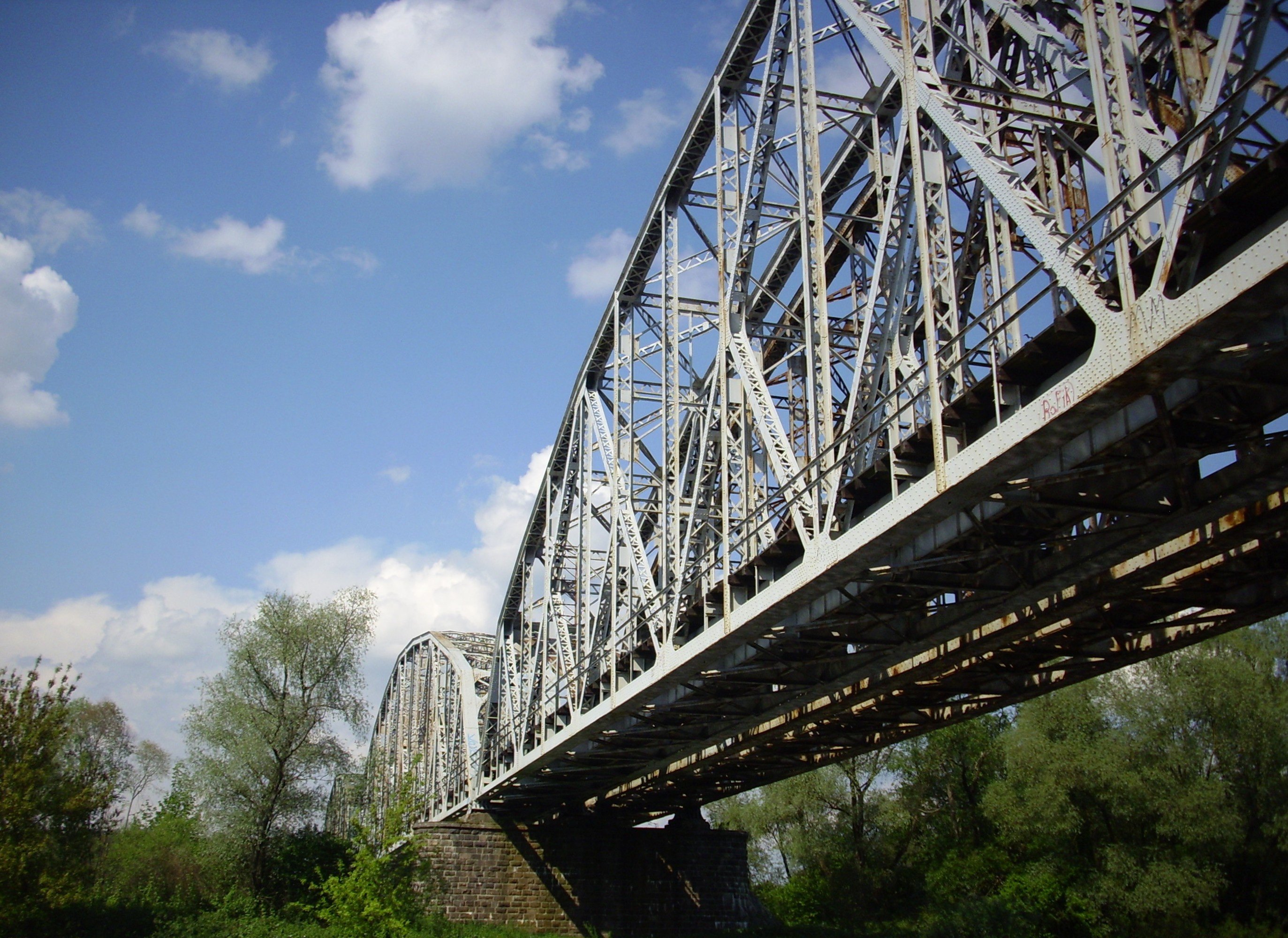

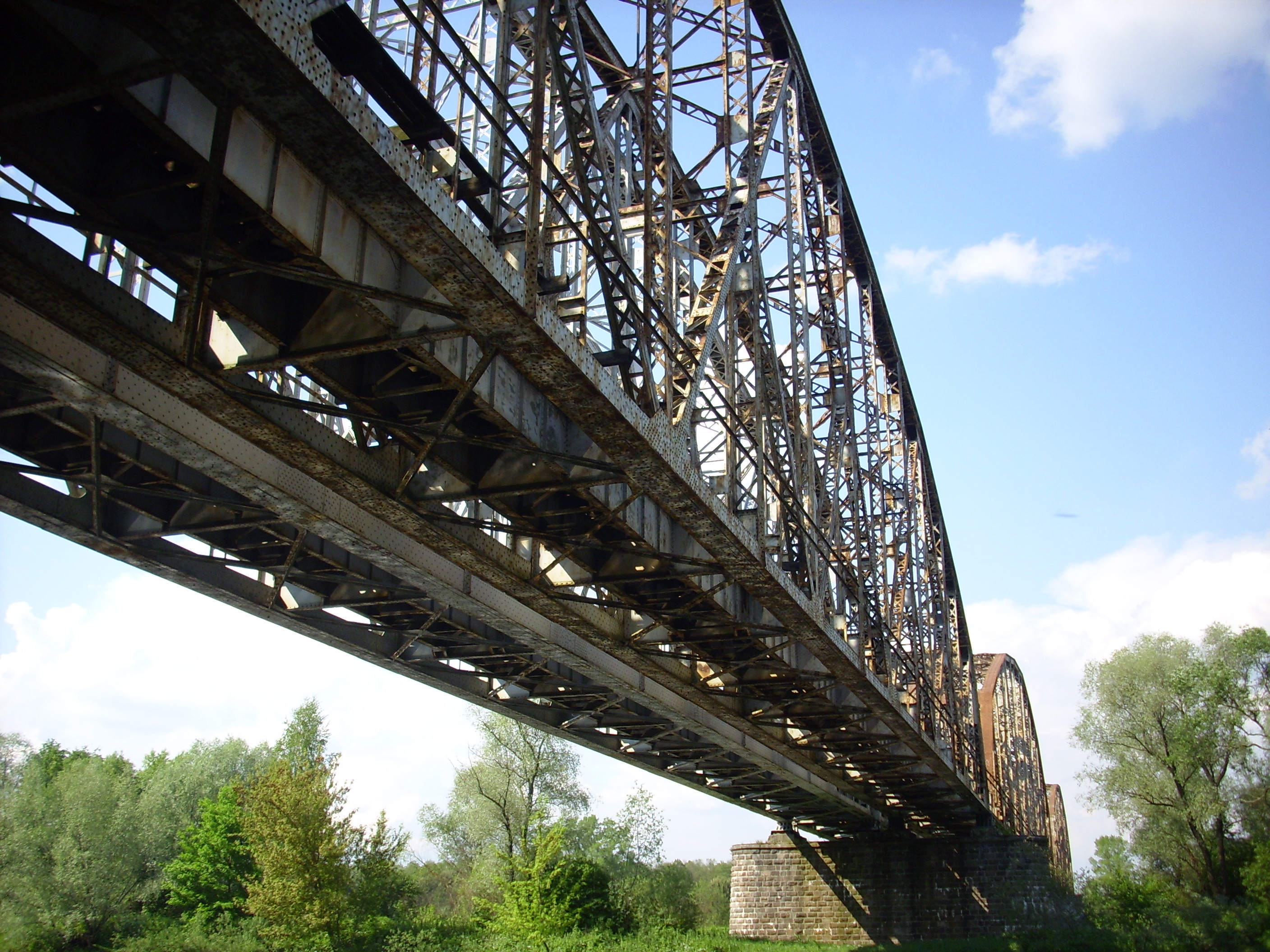

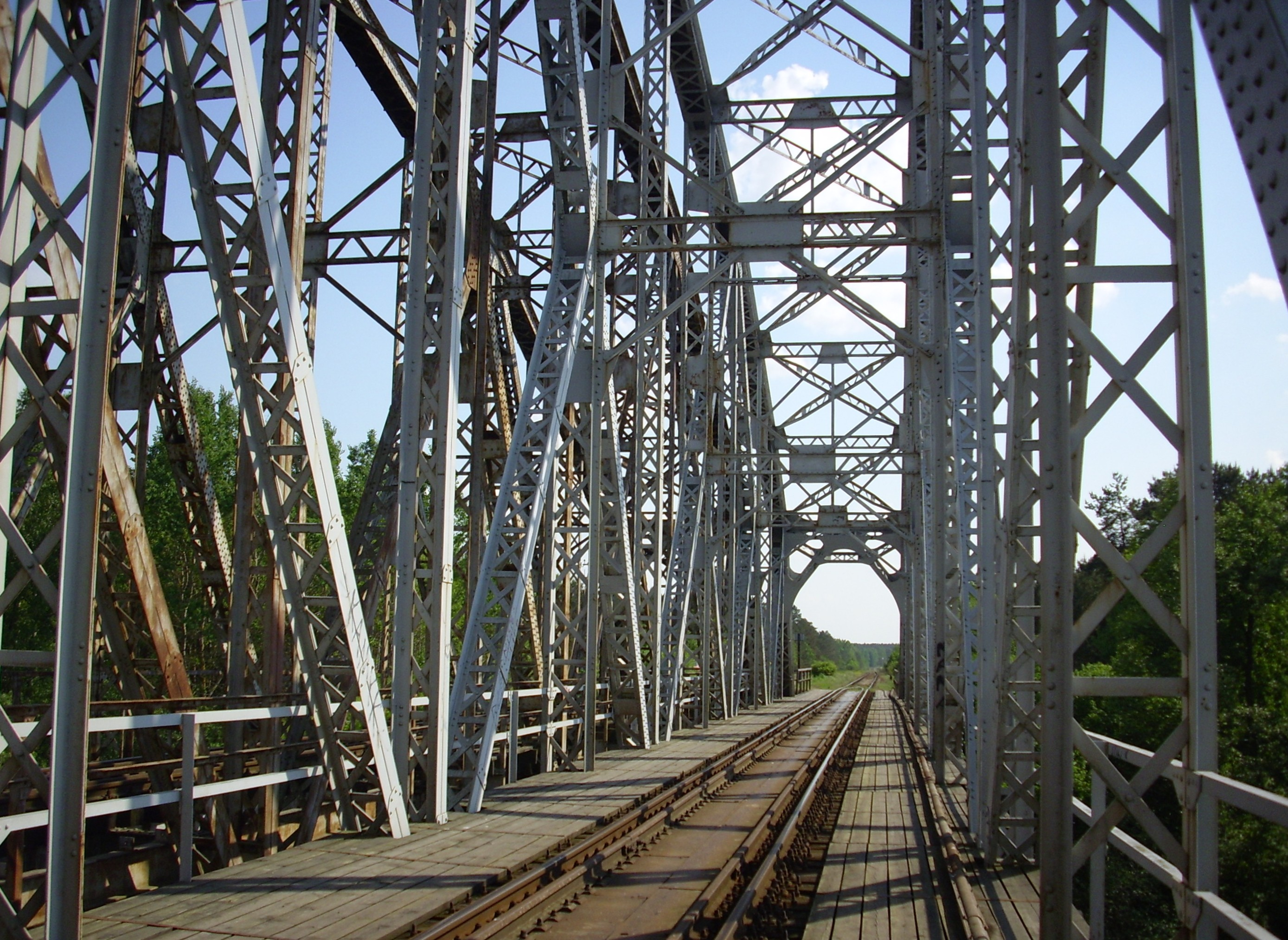
