= Krasna-Kolonia =

- Village
- Location within Poland
- Coordinates: 52°05′26″N 22°52′19″E
- Country: Poland
- Voivodeship: Masovian
- County: Łosice
- Gmina: Huszlew

Krasna-Kolonia [ˈkrasna kɔˈlɔɲa] is a village in the administrative district of Gmina Huszlew, within Łosice County, Masovian Voivodeship, in east-central Poland.
