= Władysławów, Łosice County =

Władysławów
- Village
- Location within Poland
- Coordinates: 52°07′16″N 22°54′28″E
- Country: Poland
- Voivodeship: Masovian
- County: Łosice
- Gmina: Huszlew

Władysławów [vwadɨˈswavuf] is a village in the administrative district of Gmina Huszlew, within Łosice County, Masovian Voivodeship, in east-central Poland.
