= Raczki, Masovian Voivodeship =

Raczki
- Village
- Location within Poland
- Coordinates: 52°14′N 23°2′E
- Country: Poland
- Voivodeship: Masovian
- County: Łosice
- Gmina: Sarnaki

Raczki [ˈrat͡ʂki] is a village in the administrative district of Gmina Sarnaki, within Łosice County, Masovian Voivodeship, in east-central Poland.
