= Korczówka-Kolonia =

Village in Gmina Olszanka, Poland

- Village
- Location within Poland
- Coordinates: 52°08′26″N 22°42′47″E
- Country: Poland
- Voivodeship: Masovian
- County: Łosice
- Gmina: Olszanka

Korczówka-Kolonia [kɔrˈt͡ʂufka kɔˈlɔɲa] is a village in the administrative district of Gmina Olszanka, within Łosice County, Masovian Voivodeship, in east-central Poland.
