= Zabuże =

- Village
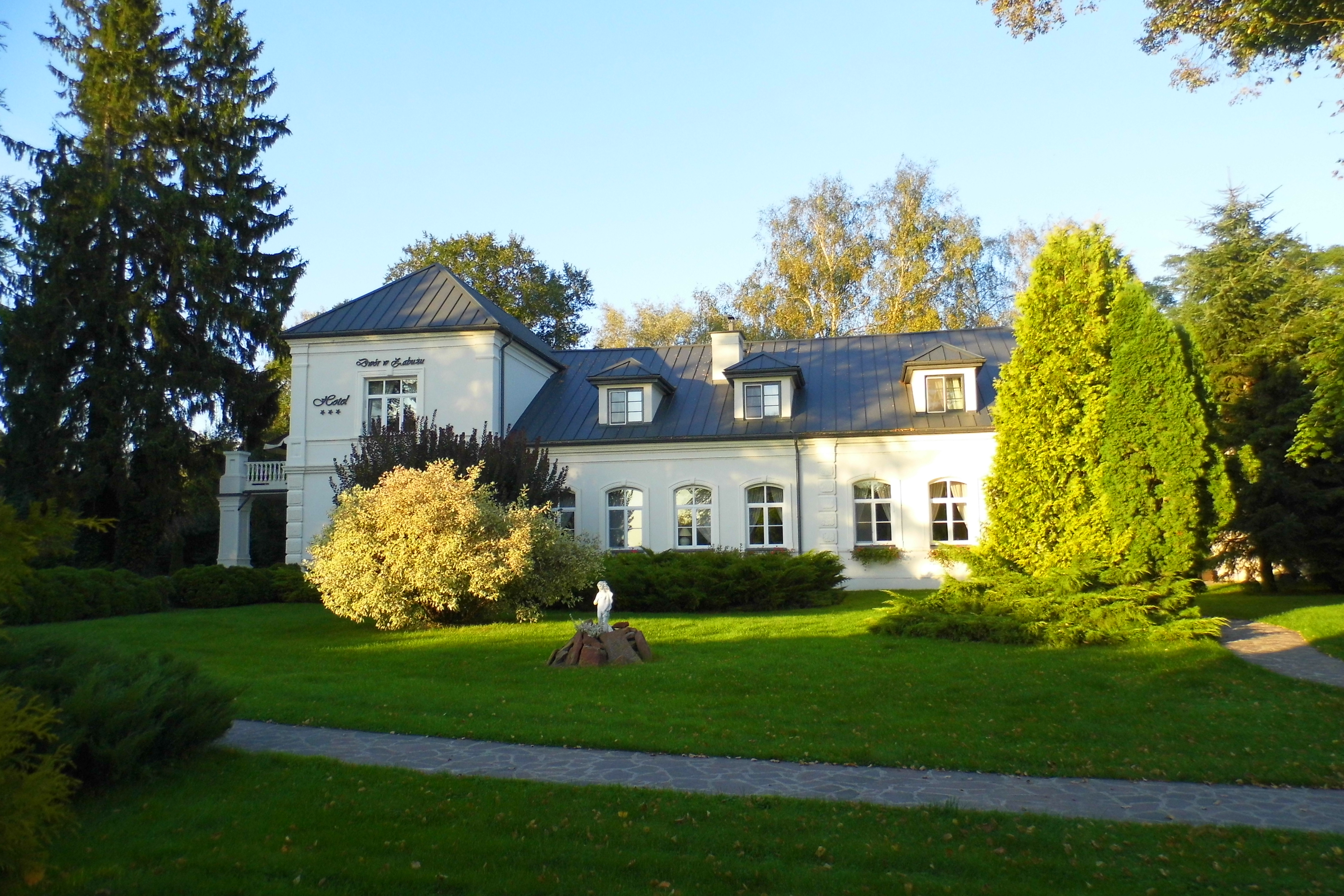
- Old manor house in Zabuże

- Location within Poland
- Coordinates: 52°19′N 23°3′E
- Country: Poland
- Voivodeship: Masovian
- County: Łosice
- Gmina: Sarnaki
- Time zone: UTC+1 (CET)
  - Summer (DST): UTC+2 (CEST)

Zabuże [zaˈbuʐɛ] is a village in the administrative district of Gmina Sarnaki, within Łosice County, Masovian Voivodeship, in east-central Poland.

Five Polish citizens were murdered by Nazi Germany in the village during World War II.
