= Korczówka, Masovian Voivodeship =

Korczówka
- Village
- Location within Poland
- Coordinates: 52°8′N 22°43′E
- Country: Poland
- Voivodeship: Masovian
- County: Łosice
- Gmina: Olszanka

Korczówka [kɔrˈt͡ʂufka] is a village in the administrative district of Gmina Olszanka, within Łosice County, Masovian Voivodeship, in east-central Poland.
