= Klimczyce-Kolonia =

- Village
- Location within Poland
- Coordinates: 52°20′46″N 22°49′51″E
- Country: Poland
- Voivodeship: Masovian
- County: Łosice
- Gmina: Sarnaki

Klimczyce-Kolonia [klimˈt͡ʂɨt͡sɛ kɔˈlɔɲa] is a village in the administrative district of Gmina Sarnaki, within Łosice County, Masovian Voivodeship, in east-central Poland.
