= Mostow =

Mostow may refer to:

== People ==
- George Mostow (1923–2017), American mathematician
  - Mostow rigidity theorem
- Jonathan Mostow (born 1961), American movie and television director

== Places ==
- Mostów, a village in Poland
