= Klimy, Masovian Voivodeship =

Klimy
- Village
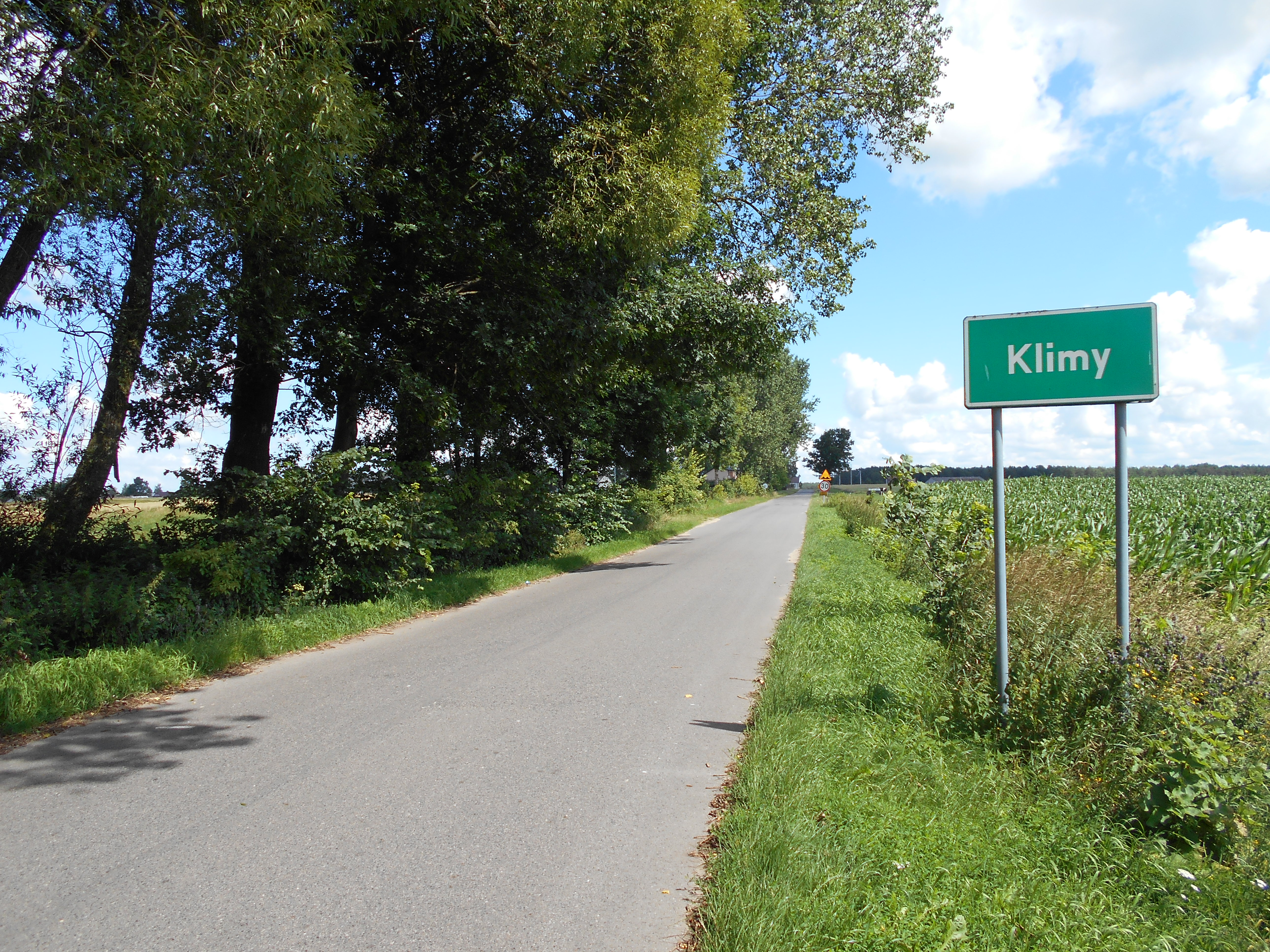

- Location within Poland
- Coordinates: 52°9′N 22°36′E
- Country: Poland
- Voivodeship: Masovian
- County: Łosice
- Gmina: Olszanka

Klimy [ˈklimɨ] is a village in the administrative district of Gmina Olszanka, within Łosice County, Masovian Voivodeship, in east-central Poland.
