= Wyczółki, Łosice County =

Wyczółki
- Village
- Location within Poland
- Coordinates: 52°11′N 22°42′E
- Country: Poland
- Voivodeship: Masovian
- County: Łosice
- Gmina: Olszanka

Wyczółki [vɨˈt͡ʂuu̯ki] is a village in the administrative district of Gmina Olszanka, within Łosice County, Masovian Voivodeship, in east-central Poland.
