= Zienie =

- Village
- Location within Poland
- Coordinates: 52°10′N 22°50′E
- Country: Poland
- Voivodeship: Masovian
- County: Łosice
- Gmina: Huszlew

Zienie [ˈʑɛɲɛ] is a village in the administrative district of Gmina Huszlew, within Łosice County, Masovian Voivodeship, in east-central Poland.
