= Makarówka =

- Village
- Location within Poland
- Coordinates: 52°7′26″N 22°52′46″E
- Country: Poland
- Voivodeship: Masovian
- County: Łosice
- Gmina: Huszlew

Makarówka [makaˈrufka] is a village in the administrative district of Gmina Huszlew, within Łosice County, Masovian Voivodeship, in east-central Poland.
