= Płosków-Kolonia =

Village in Gmina Sarnaki, Poland

- Village
- Location within Poland
- Coordinates: 52°18′22″N 22°55′34″E
- Country: Poland
- Voivodeship: Masovian
- County: Łosice
- Gmina: Sarnaki

Płosków-Kolonia [ˈpwɔskuf kɔˈlɔɲa] is a village in the administrative district of Gmina Sarnaki, within Łosice County, Masovian Voivodeship, in east-central Poland.
