= Krasna, Masovian Voivodeship =

Krasna
- Village
- Location within Poland
- Coordinates: 52°5′N 22°52′E
- Country: Poland
- Voivodeship: Masovian
- County: Łosice
- Gmina: Huszlew

Krasna [ˈkrasna] is a village in the administrative district of Gmina Huszlew, within Łosice County, Masovian Voivodeship, in east-central Poland.
