= Próchenki =

- Village
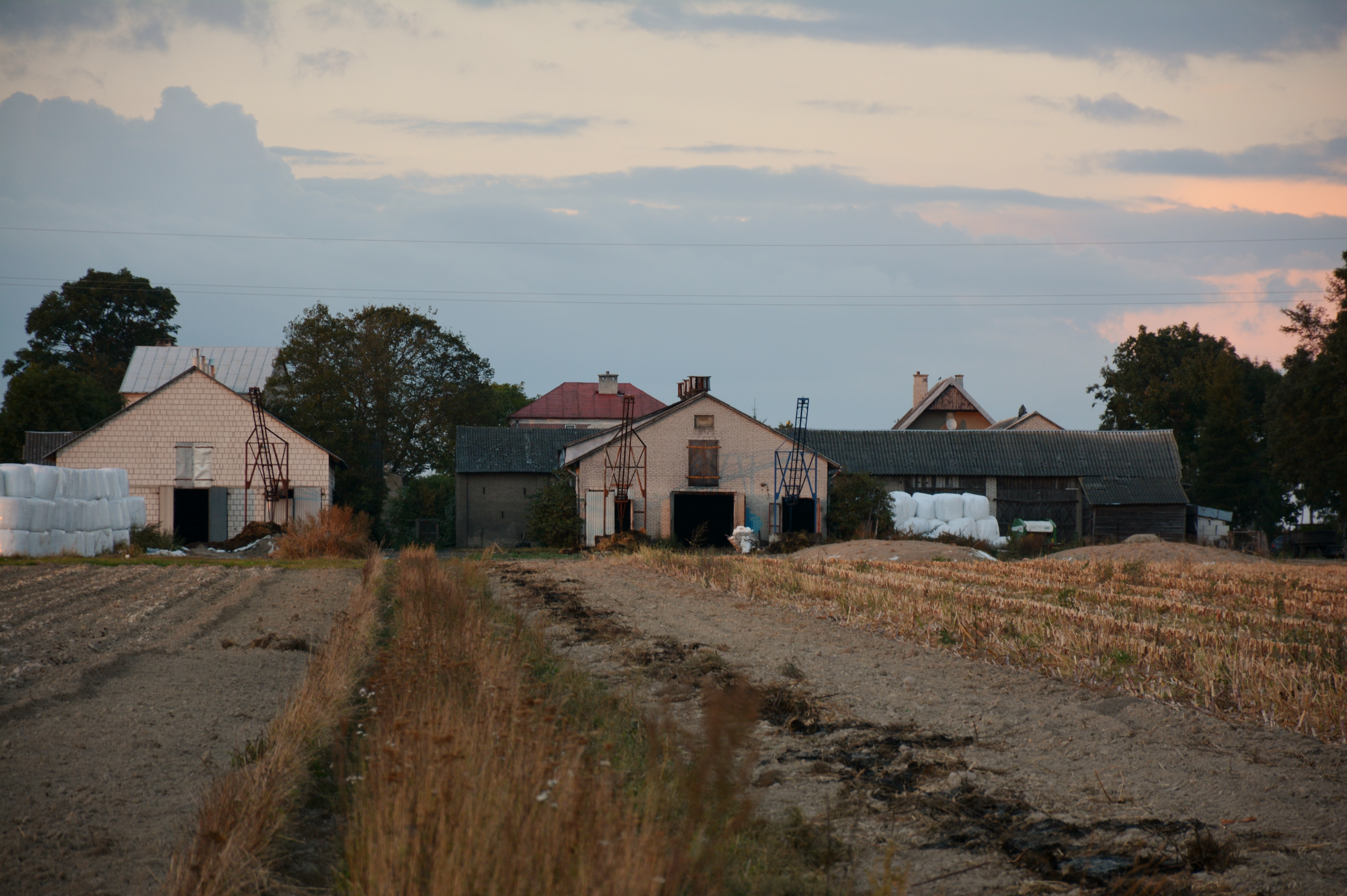
- Establishments in Prochenki

- Location within Poland
- Coordinates: 52°6′46″N 22°39′1″E
- Country: Poland
- Voivodeship: Masovian
- County: Łosice
- Gmina: Olszanka

Próchenki [pruˈxɛŋki] is a village in the administrative district of Gmina Olszanka, within Łosice County, Masovian Voivodeship, in east-central Poland.
