= Horoszki Duże =

- Village
- Location within Poland
- Coordinates: 52°16′N 23°0′E
- Country: Poland
- Voivodeship: Masovian
- County: Łosice
- Gmina: Sarnaki

Horoszki Duże [xɔˈrɔʂki ˈduʐɛ] is a village in the administrative district of Gmina Sarnaki, within Łosice County, Masovian Voivodeship, in east-central Poland.
