= Sewerynów, Łosice County =

Village in Gmina Huszlew, Poland

Sewerynów
- Village
- Location within Poland
- Coordinates: 52°10′15″N 22°48′21″E
- Country: Poland
- Voivodeship: Masovian
- County: Łosice
- Gmina: Huszlew

Sewerynów [sɛvɛˈrɨnuf] is a village in the administrative district of Gmina Huszlew, within Łosice County, Masovian Voivodeship, in east-central Poland.
