= Hołowczyce-Kolonia =

Village in Gmina Sarnaki, Poland

- Village
- Location within Poland
- Coordinates: 52°18′50″N 22°56′0″E
- Country: Poland
- Voivodeship: Masovian
- County: Łosice
- Gmina: Sarnaki
- Time zone: UTC+1 (CET)
  - Summer (DST): UTC+2 (CEST)

Hołowczyce-Kolonia [xɔwɔfˈt͡ʂɨt͡sɛ kɔˈlɔɲa] is a village in the administrative district of Gmina Sarnaki, within Łosice County, Masovian Voivodeship, in eastern Poland.

Five Polish citizens were murdered by Nazi Germany in Hołowczyce-Kolonia, Stare Hołowczyce and Nowe Hołowczyce during World War II.
