= Felin, Masovian Voivodeship =

Felin
- Village
- Location within Poland
- Coordinates: 52°9′14″N 22°49′5″E
- Country: Poland
- Voivodeship: Masovian
- County: Łosice
- Gmina: Huszlew

Felin [ˈfɛlin] is a village in the administrative district of Gmina Huszlew, within Łosice County, Masovian Voivodeship, in east-central Poland.
