= Kopce, Masovian Voivodeship =

Kopce
- Village
- Location within Poland
- Coordinates: 52°7′N 22°45′E
- Country: Poland
- Voivodeship: Masovian
- County: Łosice
- Gmina: Huszlew

Kopce [ˈkɔpt͡sɛ] is a village in the administrative district of Gmina Huszlew, within Łosice County, Masovian Voivodeship, in east-central Poland.
