= Franopol, Masovian Voivodeship =

Franopol
- Village
- Location within Poland
- Coordinates: 52°19′50″N 22°52′42″E
- Country: Poland
- Voivodeship: Masovian
- County: Łosice
- Gmina: Sarnaki

Franopol [fraˈnɔpɔl] is a village in the administrative district of Gmina Sarnaki, within Łosice County, Masovian Voivodeship, in east-central Poland.
