= Chlebczyn =

- Village
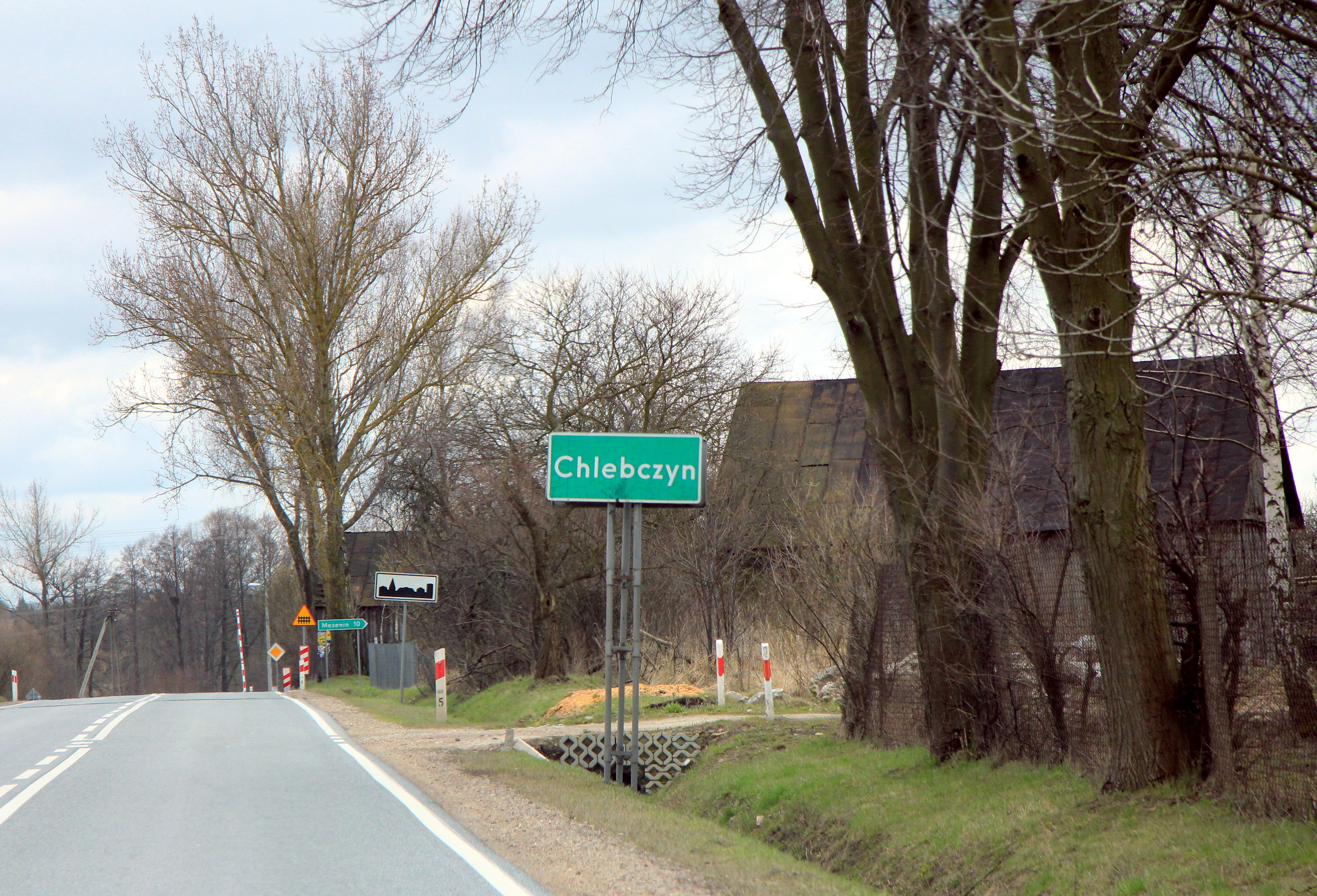

- Location within Poland
- Coordinates: 52°20′N 22°53′E
- Country: Poland
- Voivodeship: Masovian
- County: Łosice
- Gmina: Sarnaki
- Time zone: UTC+1 (CET)
  - Summer (DST): UTC+2 (CEST)

Chlebczyn [ˈxlɛpt͡ʂɨn] is a village in the administrative district of Gmina Sarnaki, within Łosice County, Masovian Voivodeship, in eastern Poland.

Five Polish citizens were murdered by Nazi Germany in the village during World War II.
