= Klepaczew =

- Village
- Location within Poland
- Coordinates: 52°18′N 23°3′E
- Country: Poland
- Voivodeship: Masovian
- County: Łosice
- Gmina: Sarnaki
- Population: 116

Klepaczew [klɛˈpat͡ʂɛf] is a village in the administrative district of Gmina Sarnaki, within Łosice County, Masovian Voivodeship, in east-central Poland.
