= Dawidy =

Dawidy may refer to the following villages in Poland:

- Dawidy, Lublin Voivodeship (east Poland)
- Dawidy, Łosice County in Masovian Voivodeship (east-central Poland)
- Dawidy, Pruszków County in Masovian Voivodeship (east-central Poland)
- Dawidy, Warmian-Masurian Voivodeship (north-east Poland)

See also: Dawidy Bankowe
