= Czesław Baran =

Polish politician (1937–2021)

Member of the Sejm
- In office 13 October 1985 – 3 June 1989

Personal details
- Born: 25 August 1937 Pietrusy, Poland
- Died: 2 March 2021 (aged 83) Siedlce, Poland
- Party: ZSL

Czesław Baran (25 August 1937 – 2 March 2021) was a Polish politician and agronomist.

== Biography ==
Czesław was born in Pietrusy on 25 August 1937 to Bolesław and Regina Baran. He was a member of the Union of Polish Youth from 1950 to 1957 and from 1960 to 1974 the Związek Młodzieży Wiejskiej. He worked as a technician for the state water supply company in Międzyrzec Podlaski from 1955 to 1960 and subsequently handled water supply in Łosice. In 1979, he graduated from the Warsaw University of Life Sciences.

From 1962 to 1975, Baran was leader of the United People's Party in the city of Łosice. He led the Poviat Party Committee from 1981 until its dissolution in 1989. He was also a member of the Provincial Council of the Patriotic Movement for National Rebirth. From 1985 to 1989, he was a member of the Sejm, where he was part of the Local Government Affairs Committee.

Czesław Baran died in Siedlce on 2 March 2021 at the age of 83.

== Decorations ==
- Order of Polonia Restituta
- Medal of the 30th Anniversary of People's Poland
- Medal of the 40th Anniversary of People's Poland
