= Nowe Mierzwice =

- Village
- Location within Poland
- Coordinates: 52°20′58″N 22°56′57″E
- Country: Poland
- Voivodeship: Masovian
- County: Łosice
- Gmina: Sarnaki

Nowe Mierzwice [ˈnɔvɛ mjɛʐˈvit͡sɛ] is a village in the administrative district of Gmina Sarnaki, within Łosice County, Masovian Voivodeship, in east-central Poland.
