= Żurawlówka =

- Village
- Location within Poland
- Coordinates: 52°6′4″N 22°50′48″E
- Country: Poland
- Voivodeship: Masovian
- County: Łosice
- Gmina: Huszlew
- Population: 200

Żurawlówka [ʐuraˈvlufka] is a village in the administrative district of Gmina Huszlew, within Łosice County, Masovian Voivodeship, in east-central Poland.
