= Dziadkowskie-Folwark =

- Village
- Location within Poland
- Coordinates: 52°05′10″N 22°48′29″E
- Country: Poland
- Voivodeship: Masovian
- County: Łosice
- Gmina: Huszlew

Dziadkowskie-Folwark [d͡ʑatˈkɔfskʲɛ ˈfɔlvark] is a village in the administrative district of Gmina Huszlew, within Łosice County, Masovian Voivodeship, in east-central Poland.
