= Nowe Litewniki =

- Village
- Location within Poland
- Coordinates: 52°15′28″N 22°57′10″E
- Country: Poland
- Voivodeship: Masovian
- County: Łosice
- Gmina: Sarnaki

Nowe Litewniki [ˈnɔvɛ litɛvˈniki] is a village in the administrative district of Gmina Sarnaki, within Łosice County, Masovian Voivodeship, in east-central Poland.
