= Kózki =

Kózki may refer to the following places:

- Kózki, Łosice County in Masovian Voivodeship (east-central Poland)
- Kózki, Węgrów County in Masovian Voivodeship (east-central Poland)
- Kózki, Świętokrzyskie Voivodeship (south-central Poland)
- Kózki, Opole Voivodeship (south-west Poland)
- Kózki, Warmian-Masurian Voivodeship (north Poland)
