= Grzybów =

Grzybów may refer to:

- Grzybów, Łódź Voivodeship (central Poland)
- Grzybów, Subcarpathian Voivodeship (south-east Poland)
- Grzybów, Końskie County in Świętokrzyskie Voivodeship (south-central Poland)
- Grzybów, Gmina Staszów in Świętokrzyskie Voivodeship (south-central Poland)
- Grzybów, Gmina Bogoria in Świętokrzyskie Voivodeship (south-central Poland)
- Grzybów, Kozienice County in Masovian Voivodeship (east-central Poland)
- Grzybów, Łosice County in Masovian Voivodeship (east-central Poland)
- Grzybów, Płock County in Masovian Voivodeship (east-central Poland)

== See also ==
- Grybów
