= Bonine (surname) =

Bonine is a surname. Notable people with the name include:

- Eddie Bonine (born 1981), American baseball player
- Elias Bonine (1843–1916), American photographer of Native American portraits
- Fred Bonine (1863–1941), American athlete and eye doctor
- Robert Kates Bonine (1862–1923), American film director and cinematographer, captured the earliest known surf film

== See also ==
- Bonini (surname)
