= Płosków, Masovian Voivodeship =

Płosków
- Village
- Location within Poland
- Coordinates: 52°17′N 22°56′E
- Country: Poland
- Voivodeship: Masovian
- County: Łosice
- Gmina: Sarnaki
- Population: 72

Płosków [ˈpwɔskuf] is a village in the administrative district of Gmina Sarnaki, within Łosice County, Masovian Voivodeship, in east-central Poland.
