= Stare Mierzwice =

- Village
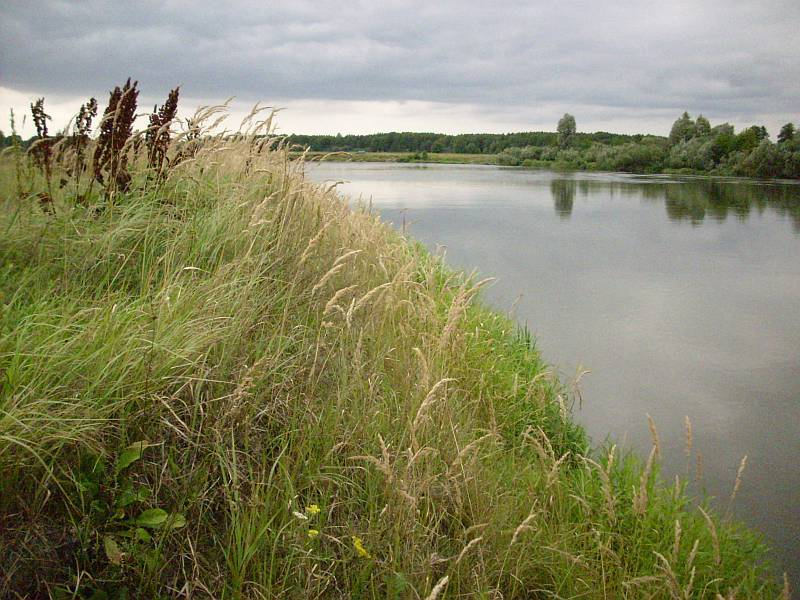
- Western Bug in Stare Mierzwice

- Coat of arms

- Location within Poland
- Coordinates: 52°20′53″N 22°58′11″E
- Country: Poland
- Voivodeship: Masovian
- County: Łosice
- Gmina: Sarnaki

Stare Mierzwice [ˈstarɛ mjɛʐˈvit͡sɛ] is a village in the administrative district of Gmina Sarnaki, within Łosice County, Masovian Voivodeship, in east-central Poland.
