= Bejdy =

- Village
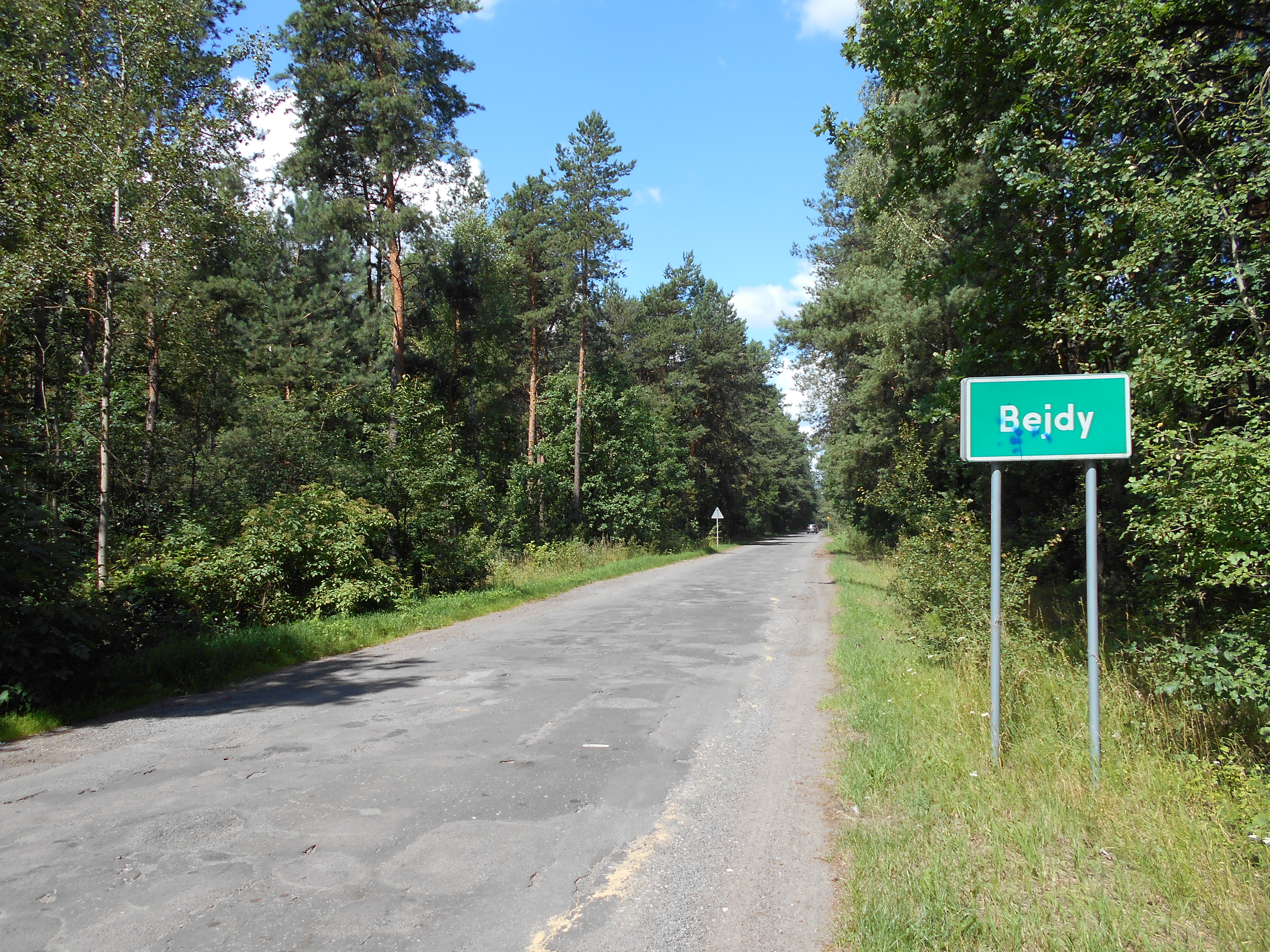

- Location within Poland
- Coordinates: 52°10′N 22°36′E
- Country: Poland
- Voivodeship: Masovian
- County: Łosice
- Gmina: Olszanka
- Time zone: UTC+1 (CET)
  - Summer (DST): UTC+2 (CEST)

Bejdy [ˈbɛi̯dɨ] is a village in the administrative district of Gmina Olszanka, within Łosice County, Masovian Voivodeship, in central Poland.

Five Polish citizens were murdered by Nazi Germany in the village during World War II.
