= Bachorza, Łosice County =

Bachorza
- Village
- Location within Poland
- Coordinates: 52°10′17″N 22°50′35″E
- Country: Poland
- Voivodeship: Masovian
- County: Łosice
- Gmina: Huszlew

Bachorza [baˈxɔʐa] is a village in the administrative district of Gmina Huszlew, within Łosice County, Masovian Voivodeship, in east-central Poland.
