= Chybów =

- Village
- Location within Poland
- Coordinates: 52°19′N 22°55′E
- Country: Poland
- Voivodeship: Masovian
- County: Łosice
- Gmina: Sarnaki

Chybów [ˈxɨbuf] is a village in the administrative district of Gmina Sarnaki, within Łosice County, Masovian Voivodeship, in east-central Poland.
