= Mszanna, Masovian Voivodeship =

Mszanna, Poland
- Village
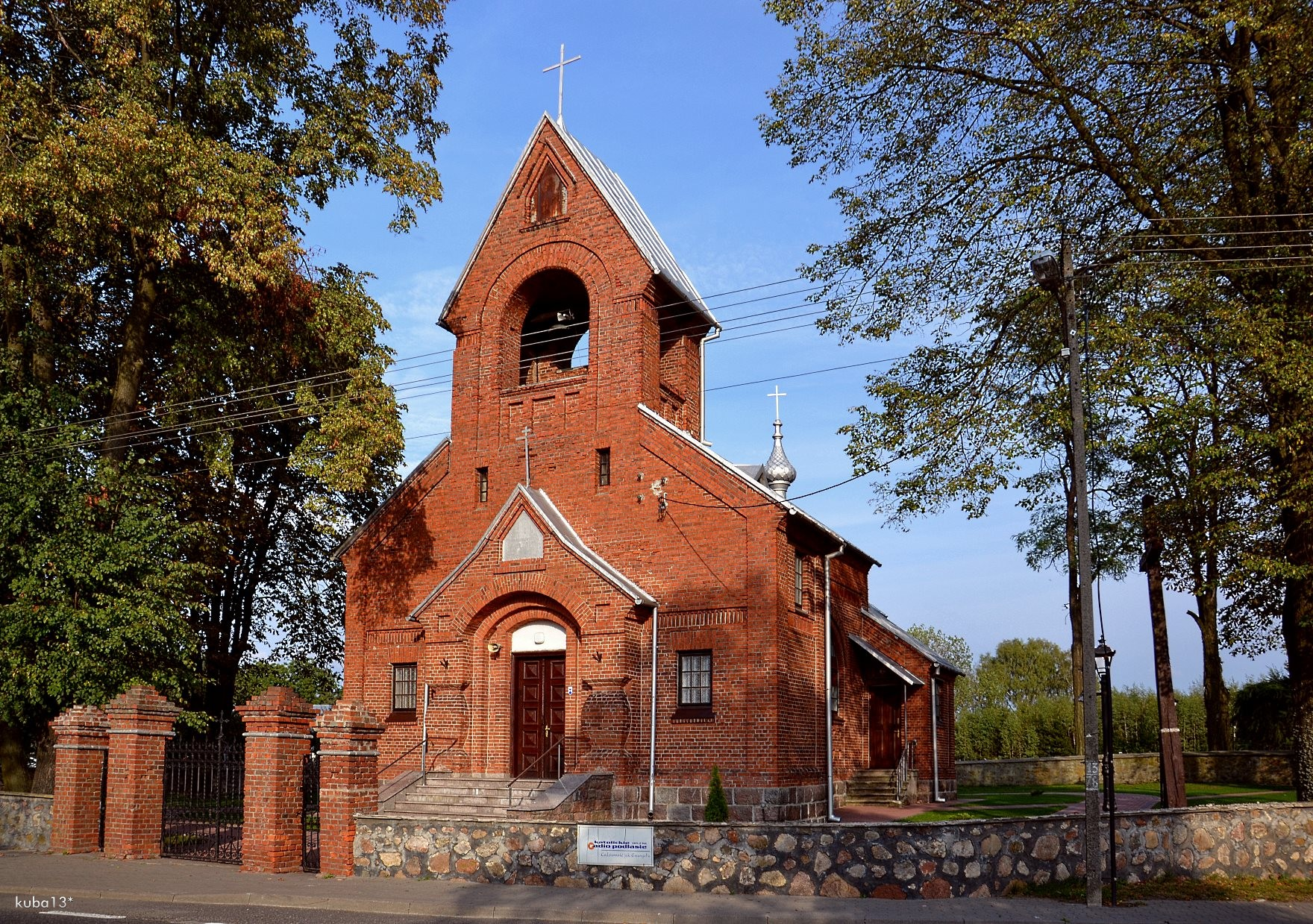
- Church in Mszana

- Location within Poland
- Coordinates: 52°9′N 22°45′E
- Country: Poland
- Voivodeship: Masovian
- County: Łosice
- Gmina: Olszanka
- Time zone: UTC+1 (CET)
  - Summer (DST): UTC+2 (CEST)

Mszanna [ˈmʂanna] is a village in the administrative district of Gmina Olszanka, within Łosice County, Masovian Voivodeship, in east-central Poland.

Six Polish citizens were murdered by Nazi Germany in the village during World War II.
