= Nowe Hołowczyce =

- Village
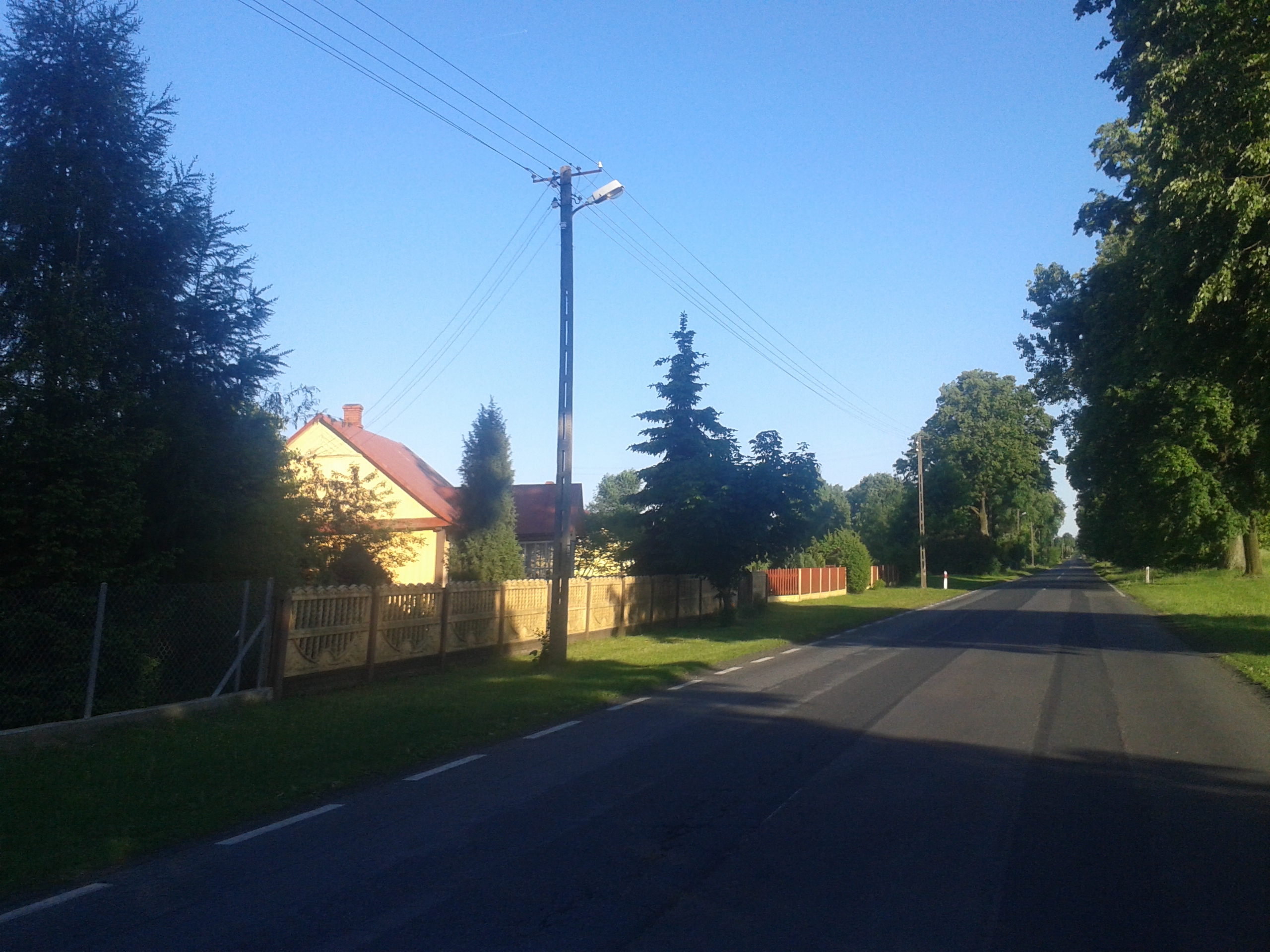

- Location within Poland
- Coordinates: 52°18′N 22°58′E
- Country: Poland
- Voivodeship: Masovian
- County: Łosice
- Gmina: Sarnaki
- Time zone: UTC+1 (CET)
  - Summer (DST): UTC+2 (CEST)

Nowe Hołowczyce [ˈnɔvɛ xɔwɔfˈt͡ʂɨt͡sɛ] is a village in the administrative district of Gmina Sarnaki, within Łosice County, Masovian Voivodeship, in eastern Poland.

Five Polish citizens were murdered by Nazi Germany in Nowe Hołowczyce, Stare Hołowczyce and Hołowczyce-Kolonia during World War II.
