= Bonin (disambiguation) =

Bonin normally refers to the Bonin Islands, a Japanese island chain SSE of the Home Islands in the North Pacific.

Bonin may also refer to:

== Places ==
- Bonin, Masovian Voivodeship (east-central Poland)
- Bonin, Choszczno County in West Pomeranian Voivodeship (north-west Poland)
- Bonin, Drawsko County in West Pomeranian Voivodeship (north-west Poland)
- Bonin, Koszalin County in West Pomeranian Voivodeship (north-west Poland)
- Bonin, Łobez County in West Pomeranian Voivodeship (north-west Poland)
- Bonin, part of the Jeżyce district of Poznań (western Poland)

== Other uses ==
- Bonin (surname)
- Von Bonin

== See also ==
- Bonin-Ogródki in Masovian Voivodeship (east-central Poland)
- Bonini
- Bonnin (disambiguation)
- Boning (disambiguation)
