= Terlików =

- Village
- Location within Poland
- Coordinates: 52°17′N 22°57′E
- Country: Poland
- Voivodeship: Masovian
- County: Łosice
- Gmina: Sarnaki
- Population (approx.): 150

Terlików [tɛrˈlikuf] is a village in the administrative district of Gmina Sarnaki, within Łosice County, Masovian Voivodeship, in east-central Poland.
