= Stare Hołowczyce =

- Village
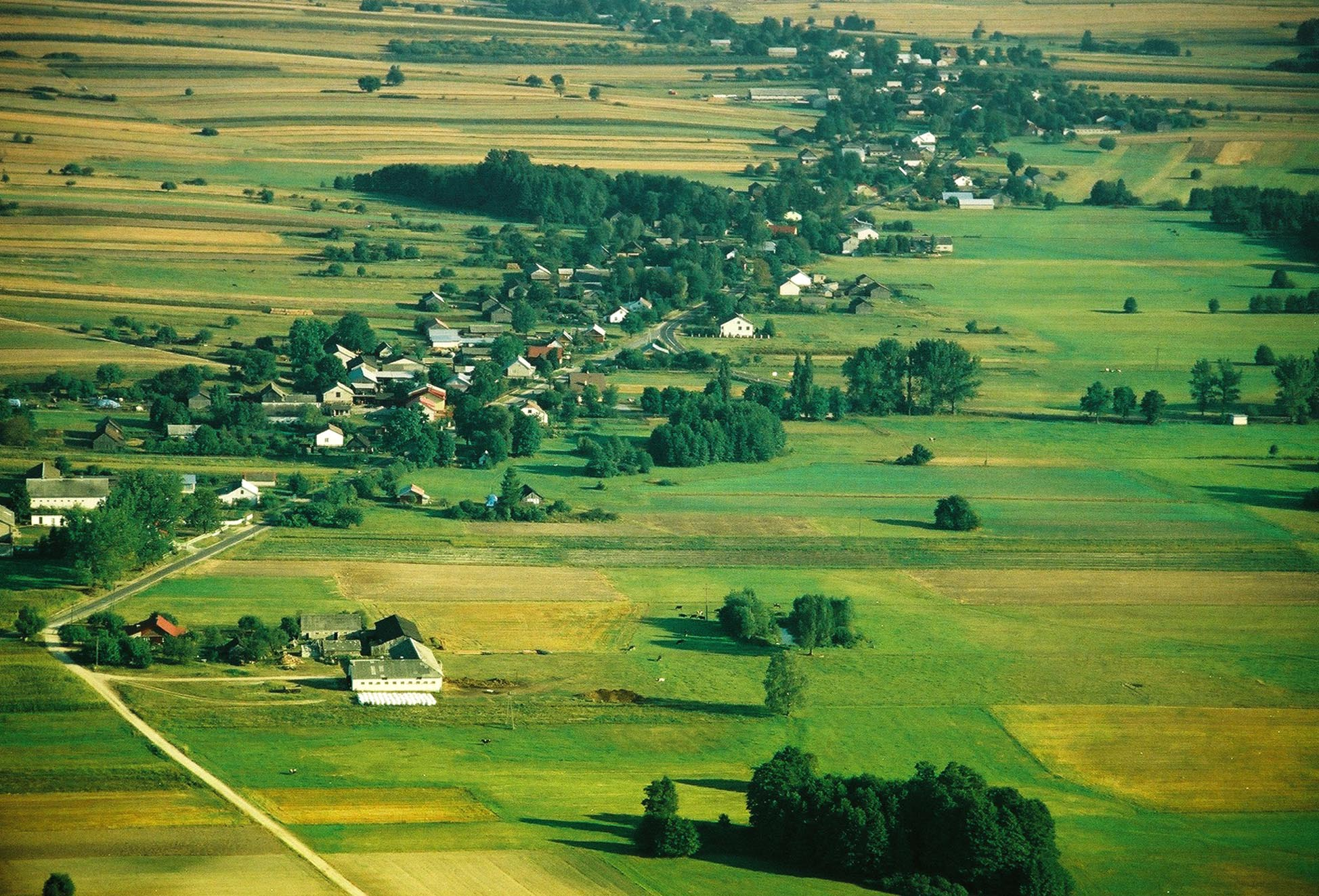
- Aerial view

- Location within Poland
- Coordinates: 52°18′29″N 22°57′13″E
- Country: Poland
- Voivodeship: Masovian
- County: Łosice
- Gmina: Sarnaki

Population
  - Total: 208
- Time zone: UTC+1 (CET)
  - Summer (DST): UTC+2 (CEST)

Stare Hołowczyce [ˈstarɛ xɔwɔfˈt͡ʂɨt͡sɛ] is a village in the administrative district of Gmina Sarnaki, within Łosice County, Masovian Voivodeship, in eastern Poland.

Five Polish citizens were murdered by Nazi Germany in Stare Hołowczyce, Nowe Hołowczyce and Hołowczyce-Kolonia during World War II.
