= Binduga =

Binduga may refer to the following places:

- Binduga, Łosice County in Masovian Voivodeship (east-central Poland)
- Binduga, Przasnysz County in Masovian Voivodeship (east-central Poland)
- Binduga, Pomeranian Voivodeship (north Poland)
- Binduga, Warmian-Masurian Voivodeship (north Poland)
