= Bonino =

Bonino may refer to:

- Bonino (surname), an Italian surname
- Bonino de Boninis (1454–1528), Venetian printer
- Bonino da Campione (fl. late 1300s), Italian sculptor
- Bonino Mombrizio (1424–1482 and 1502, perhaps 1500), Italian philologist, humanist, and editor of ancient writings
- Bonino (TV series), 1950s American sitcom
- Bonino List, a liberal and libertarian electoral list active in Italy from 1999 to 2004
- Bonino-Pannella List, a liberal and libertarian electoral list formed by the Italian Radicals

== See also ==
- Bonin (disambiguation)
