= Podlasie Bug Gorge Landscape Park =

Protected area in eastern Poland

- Park Krajobrazowy Podlaski Przełom Bugu
- IUCN category V (protected landscape/seascape)
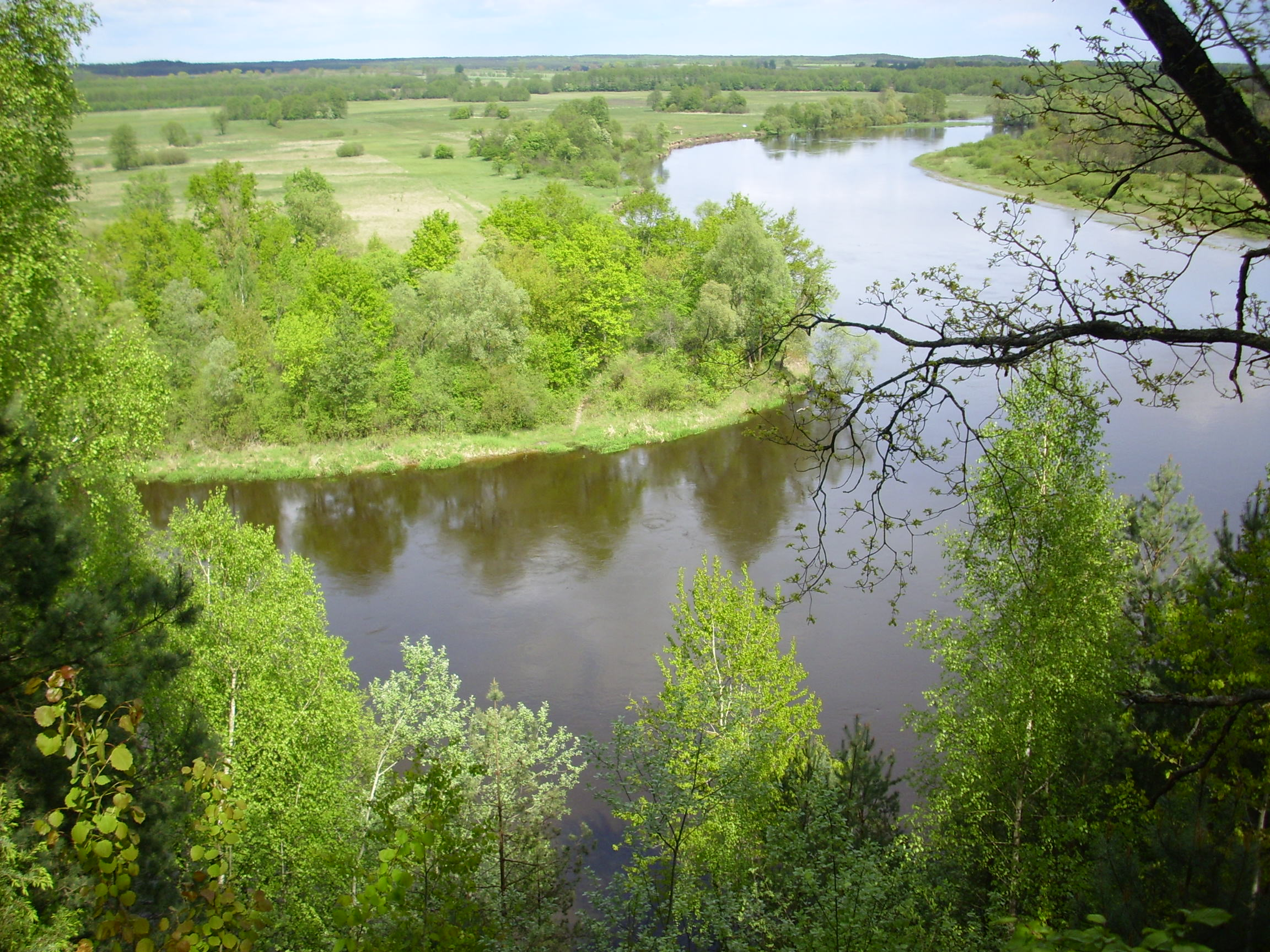
- Bug River in the park

- Location within Poland
- Location: east Poland
- Coordinates: 52.2125°N 23.2893°E
- Area: 309.04 km^{2} (119.32 sq mi)
- Established: 1994

Podlasie Bug Gorge Landscape Park (Park Krajobrazowy Podlaski Przełom Bugu) is a protected area (Landscape Park) in eastern Poland, established in 1994, covering an area of 309.04 square kilometres (119.32 sq mi).

The Park is shared between two voivodeships: Lublin Voivodeship and Masovian Voivodeship. Within Lublin Voivodeship it lies in Biała County (Gmina Janów Podlaski, Gmina Konstantynów, Gmina Rokitno, Gmina Terespol). Within Masovian Voivodeship it lies in Łosice County (Gmina Platerów, Gmina Sarnaki).

Within the Landscape Park are four nature reserves.
