= Antolin, Gmina Konstantynów =

Antolin
- Village
- Location within Poland
- Coordinates: 52°15′27″N 23°9′2″E
- Country: Poland
- Voivodeship: Lublin
- County: Biała
- Gmina: Konstantynów

Population
  - Total: 140

Antolin [anˈtɔlʲin] is a village in the administrative district of Gmina Konstantynów, within Biała County, Lublin Voivodeship, in eastern Poland.
