= Komarno, Lublin Voivodeship =

Komarno
- Village
- Location within Poland
- Coordinates: 52°9′24″N 23°6′50″E
- Country: Poland
- Voivodeship: Lublin
- County: Biała
- Gmina: Konstantynów
- Time zone: UTC+1 (CET)
  - Summer (DST): UTC+2 (CEST)

Komarno [kɔˈmarnɔ] is a village in the administrative district of Gmina Konstantynów, within Biała County, Lublin Voivodeship, in eastern Poland.

== History ==
Five Polish citizens were murdered by Nazi Germany in the village during World War II.
