= Solinki =

- Village
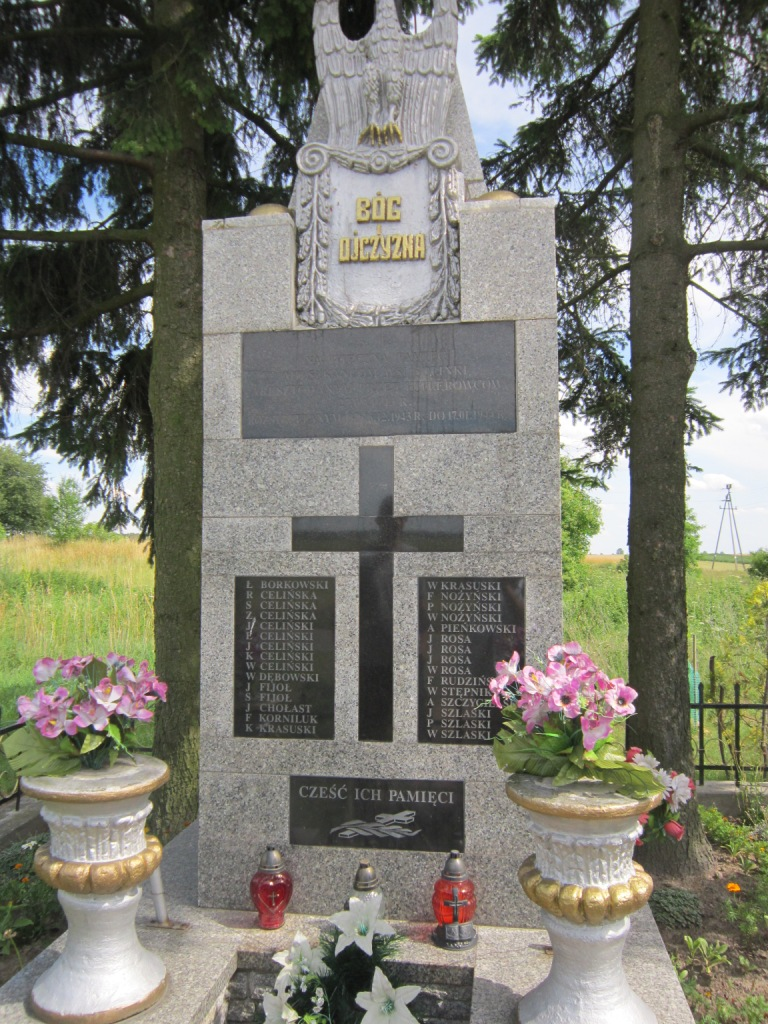

- Location within Poland
- Coordinates: 52°08′42″N 23°06′37″E
- Country: Poland
- Voivodeship: Lublin
- County: Biała
- Gmina: Konstantynów

Population (approx.)
  - Total: 100

Solinki [sɔˈlʲiŋkʲi] is a village in the administrative district of Gmina Konstantynów, within Biała County, Lublin Voivodeship, in eastern Poland.
