= Gmina Olszanka, Masovian Voivodeship =

Gmina Olszanka Olszanka Commune
- Gmina
- Coat of arms
- Interactive map of Gmina Olszanka
- Coordinates (Olszanka): 52°9′N 22°40′E
- Country: Poland
- Voivodeship: Masovian
- County: Łosice
- Seat: Olszanka

Area
  - Total: 87.34 km^{2} (33.72 sq mi)

Population (2014)
  - Total: 3,051
  - Density: 34.93/km^{2} (90.47/sq mi)
- Website: http://www.olszanka.gminarp.pl

Gmina Olszanka is a rural gmina (administrative district) in Łosice County, Masovian Voivodeship, in east-central Poland. Its seat is the village of Olszanka, which lies approximately 8 kilometres (5 mi) south-west of Łosice and 113 km (70 mi) east of Warsaw.

The gmina covers an area of 87.34 square kilometres (33.7 sq mi), and as of 2006 its total population is 3,205 (3,051 in 2014).

== Villages ==
Gmina Olszanka contains the villages and settlements of Bejdy, Bolesty, Dawidy, Hadynów, Klimy, Korczówka, Korczówka-Kolonia, Mszanna, Nowe Łepki, Olszanka, Pietrusy, Próchenki, Radlnia, Stare Łepki, Szawły, Szydłówka and Wyczółki.

== Neighbouring gminas ==
Gmina Olszanka is bordered by the gminas of Huszlew, Łosice, Międzyrzec Podlaski, Mordy and Zbuczyn.
