= Konstantynów, Lublin Voivodeship =

Konstantynów
- Village
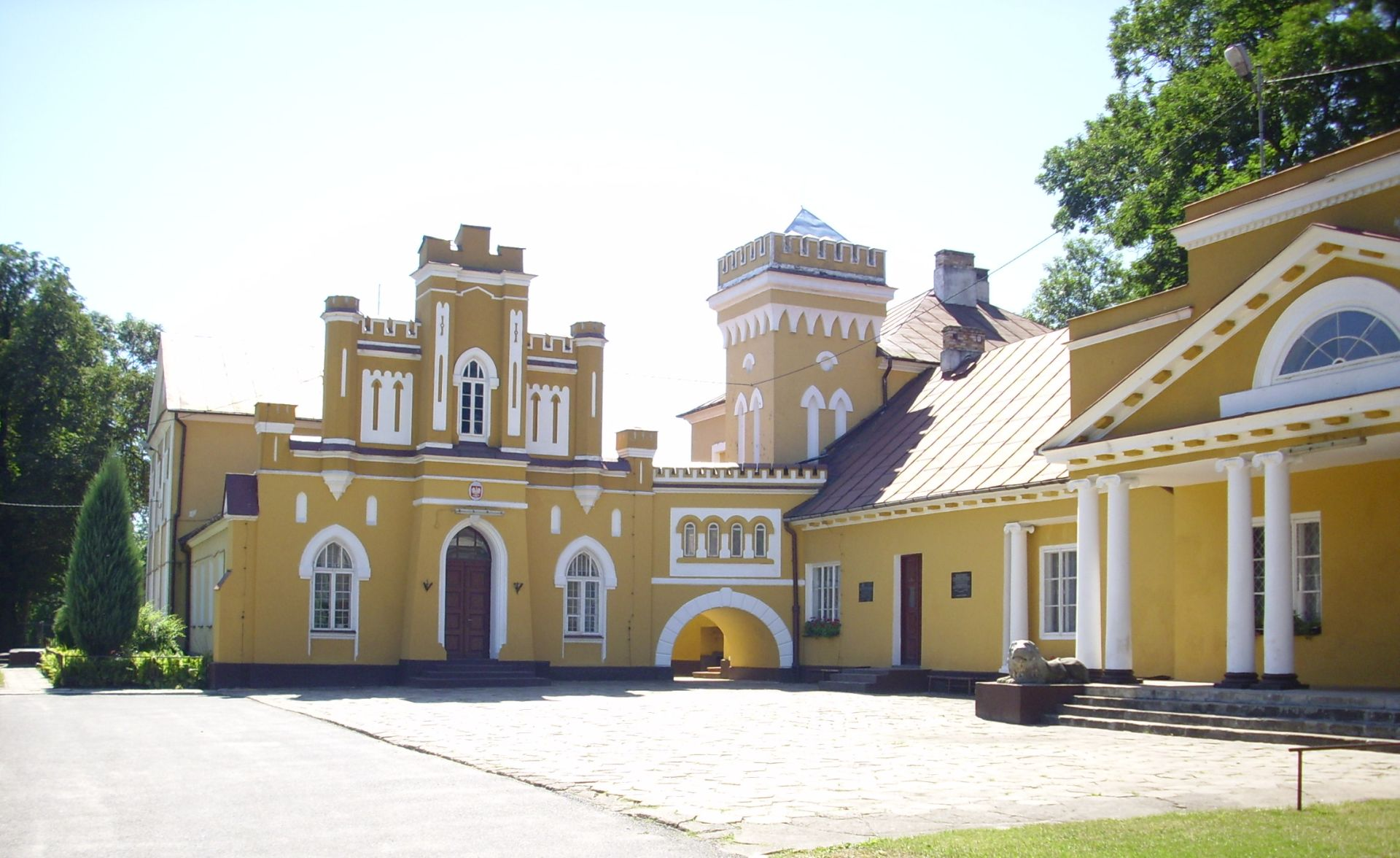
- Palace in Konstantynów

- Location within Poland
- Coordinates: 52°12′28″N 23°5′7″E
- Country: Poland
- Voivodeship: Lublin
- County: Biała
- Gmina: Konstantynów

Population
  - Total: 1,437

Konstantynów [kɔnstanˈtɨnuf] is a village in Biała County, Lublin Voivodeship, in eastern Poland. It is the seat of the gmina (administrative district) called Gmina Konstantynów.
