= Komarno-Kolonia =

- Village
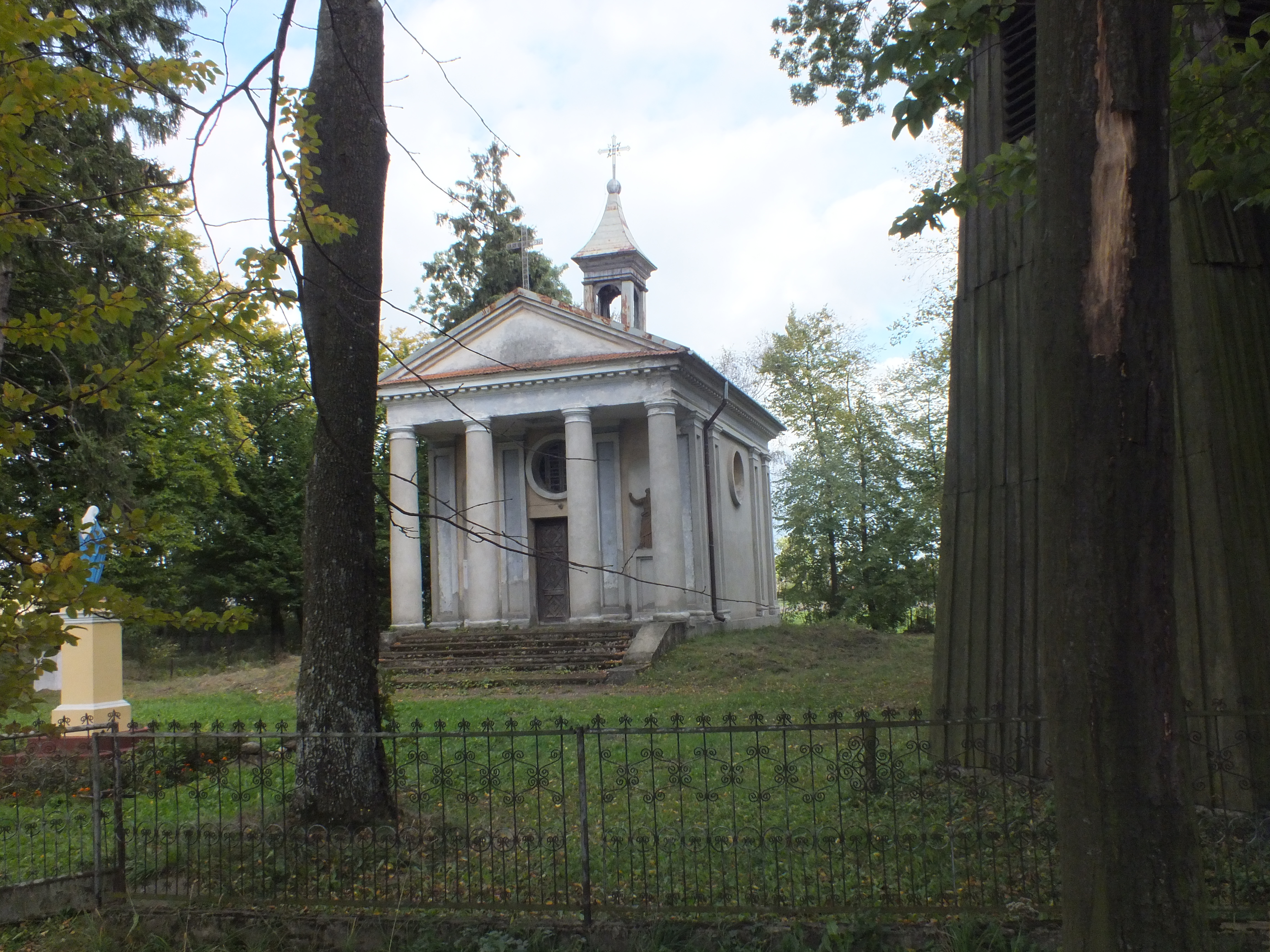

- Location within Poland
- Coordinates: 52°09′55″N 23°05′50″E
- Country: Poland
- Voivodeship: Lublin
- County: Biała
- Gmina: Konstantynów

Komarno-Kolonia [kɔˈmarnɔ kɔˈlɔɲa] is a village in the administrative district of Gmina Konstantynów, within Biała County, Lublin Voivodeship, in eastern Poland.
