= Zakalinki =

- Village
- Location within Poland
- Coordinates: 52°13′N 23°3′E
- Country: Poland
- Voivodeship: Lublin
- County: Biała
- Gmina: Konstantynów

Zakalinki [zakaˈlʲiŋkʲi] is a village in the administrative district of Gmina Konstantynów, within Biała County, Lublin Voivodeship, in eastern Poland.
