= Binduga, Łosice County =

Binduga
- Village
- Location within Poland
- Coordinates: 52°21′N 22°52′E
- Country: Poland
- Voivodeship: Masovian
- County: Łosice
- Gmina: Sarnaki
- Population: 132

Binduga [binˈduɡa] is a village in the administrative district of Gmina Sarnaki, within Łosice County, Masovian Voivodeship, in east-central Poland.
