= Gmina Konstantynów =

Gmina Konstantynów Konstantynów Commune
- Gmina
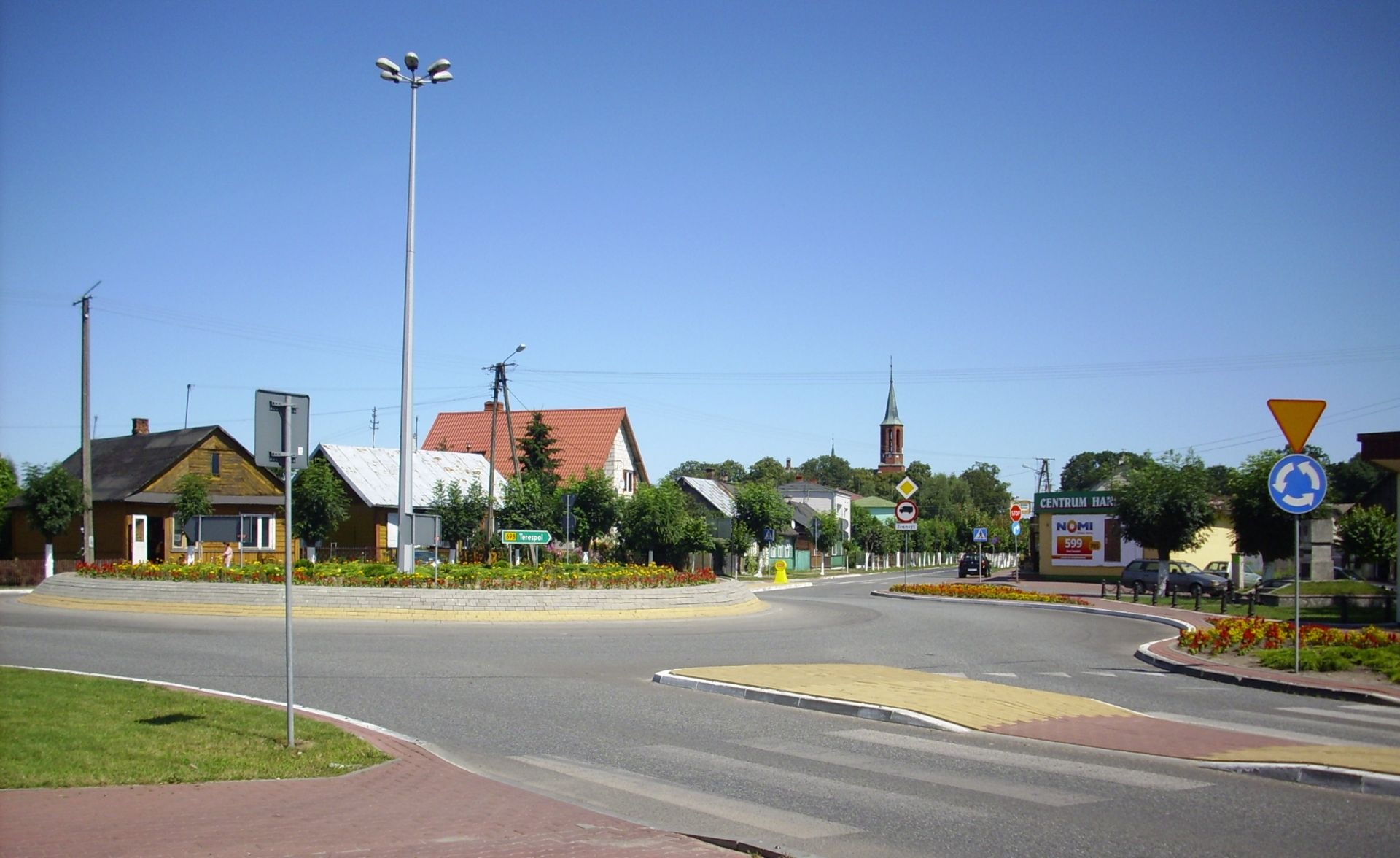

- Coat of arms

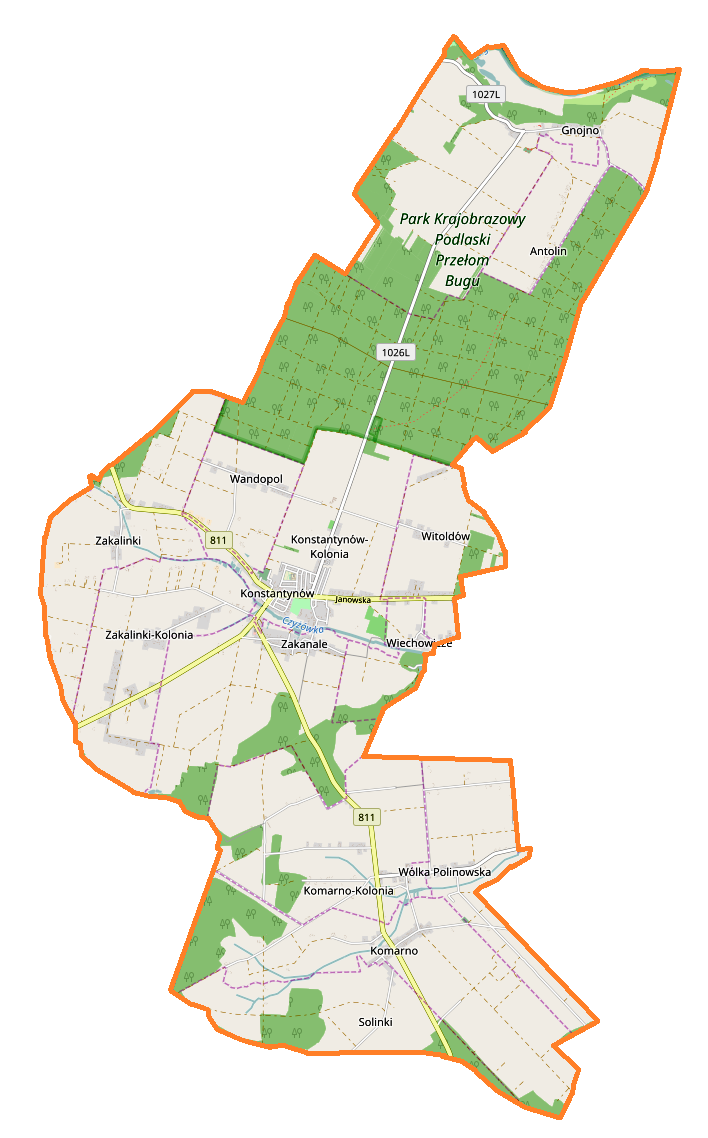

- Location within Poland
- Coordinates (Konstantynów): 52°12′28″N 23°5′7″E
- Country: Poland
- Voivodeship: Lublin
- County: Biała County
- Seat: Konstantynów

Area
  - Total: 87.06 km^{2} (33.61 sq mi)

Population (2014)
  - Total: 4,138
  - Density: 47.53/km^{2} (123.1/sq mi)
- Website: www.konstantynow.lubelskie.pl

Gmina Konstantynów is a rural gmina (administrative district) in Biała County, Lublin Voivodeship, in eastern Poland. Its seat is the village of Konstantynów, which lies approximately 20 kilometres (12 mi) north of Biała Podlaska and 113 km (70 mi) north of the regional capital Lublin.

The gmina covers an area of 87.06 square kilometres (33.6 sq mi), and as of 2006 its total population is 4,065 (4,138 in 2014).

The gmina contains part of the protected area called Podlasie Bug Gorge Landscape Park.

== Villages ==
Gmina Konstantynów contains the villages and settlements of:

- Antolin
- Gnojno
- Komarno
- Komarno-Kolonia
- Konstantynów
- Konstantynów-Kolonia
- Solinki
- Wandopol
- Wichowicze
- Witoldów
- Wólka Polinowska
- Zakalinki
- Zakalinki-Kolonia
- Zakanale

== Neighbouring gminas ==
Gmina Konstantynów is bordered by the gminas of Janów Podlaski, Leśna Podlaska, Mielnik, Sarnaki and Stara Kornica.
