= Gmina Huszlew =

Gmina Huszlew Huszlew Commune
- Gmina
- Coat of arms
- Interactive map of Gmina Huszlew
- Coordinates (Huszlew): 52°8′0″N 22°50′0″E
- Country: Poland
- Voivodeship: Masovian
- County: Łosice
- Seat: Huszlew

Area
  - Total: 117.61 km^{2} (45.41 sq mi)

Population (2014)
  - Total: 2,932
  - Density: 24.93/km^{2} (64.57/sq mi)
- Website: http://www.huszlew.pl/

Gmina Huszlew is a rural gmina (administrative district) in Łosice County, Masovian Voivodeship, in east-central Poland. Its seat is the village of Huszlew, which lies approximately 13 kilometres (8 mi) south-east of Łosice and 126 km (78 mi) east of Warsaw.

The gmina covers an area of 117.61 square kilometres (45.4 sq mi), and as of 2006 its total population is 2,976 (2,932 in 2014).

== Villages ==
Gmina Huszlew contains the villages and settlements of Bachorza, Dziadkowskie, Dziadkowskie-Folwark, Felin, Harachwosty, Huszlew, Juniewicze, Kopce, Kownaty, Krasna, Krasna-Kolonia, Krzywośnity, Ławy, Liwki Szlacheckie, Liwki Włościańskie, Makarówka, Mostów, Nieznanki, Sewerynów, Siliwonki, Waśkowólka, Władysławów, Wygoda, Zienie and Żurawlówka.

== Neighbouring gminas ==
Gmina Huszlew is bordered by the gminas of Biała Podlaska, Leśna Podlaska, Łosice, Międzyrzec Podlaski, Olszanka and Stara Kornica.
