= Wandopol =

- Village
- Location within Poland
- Coordinates: 52°14′N 23°5′E
- Country: Poland
- Voivodeship: Lublin
- County: Biała
- Gmina: Konstantynów

Wandopol [vanˈdɔpɔl] is a village in the administrative district of Gmina Konstantynów, within Biała County, Lublin Voivodeship, in eastern Poland.
