= Konstantynów-Kolonia =

- Village
- Location within Poland
- Coordinates: 52°12′30″N 23°05′55″E
- Country: Poland
- Voivodeship: Lublin
- County: Biała
- Gmina: Konstantynów

Konstantynów-Kolonia [kɔnstanˈtɨnuf kɔˈlɔɲa] is a village in the administrative district of Gmina Konstantynów, within Biała County, Lublin Voivodeship, in eastern Poland.
