= Kózki, Łosice County =

Kózki
- Village
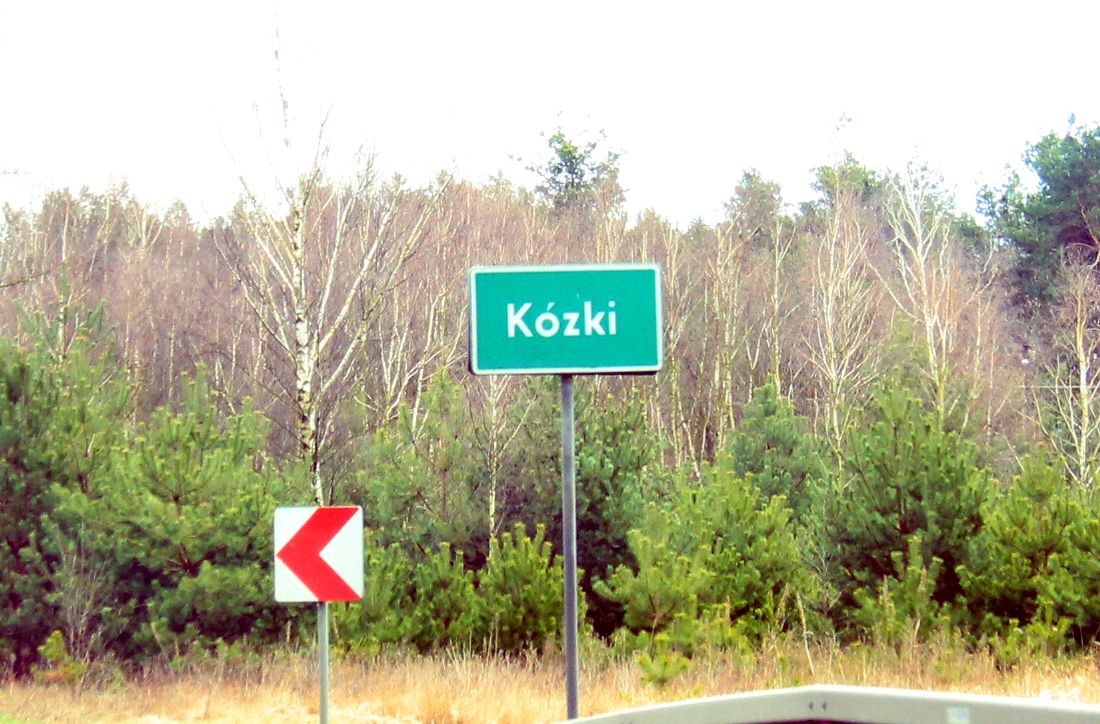

- Location within Poland
- Coordinates: 52°21′N 22°53′E
- Country: Poland
- Voivodeship: Masovian
- County: Łosice
- Gmina: Sarnaki

Kózki [ˈkuski] is a village in the administrative district of Gmina Sarnaki, within Łosice County, Masovian Voivodeship, in east-central Poland.
