= Olszanka, Łosice County =

Olszanka
- Village
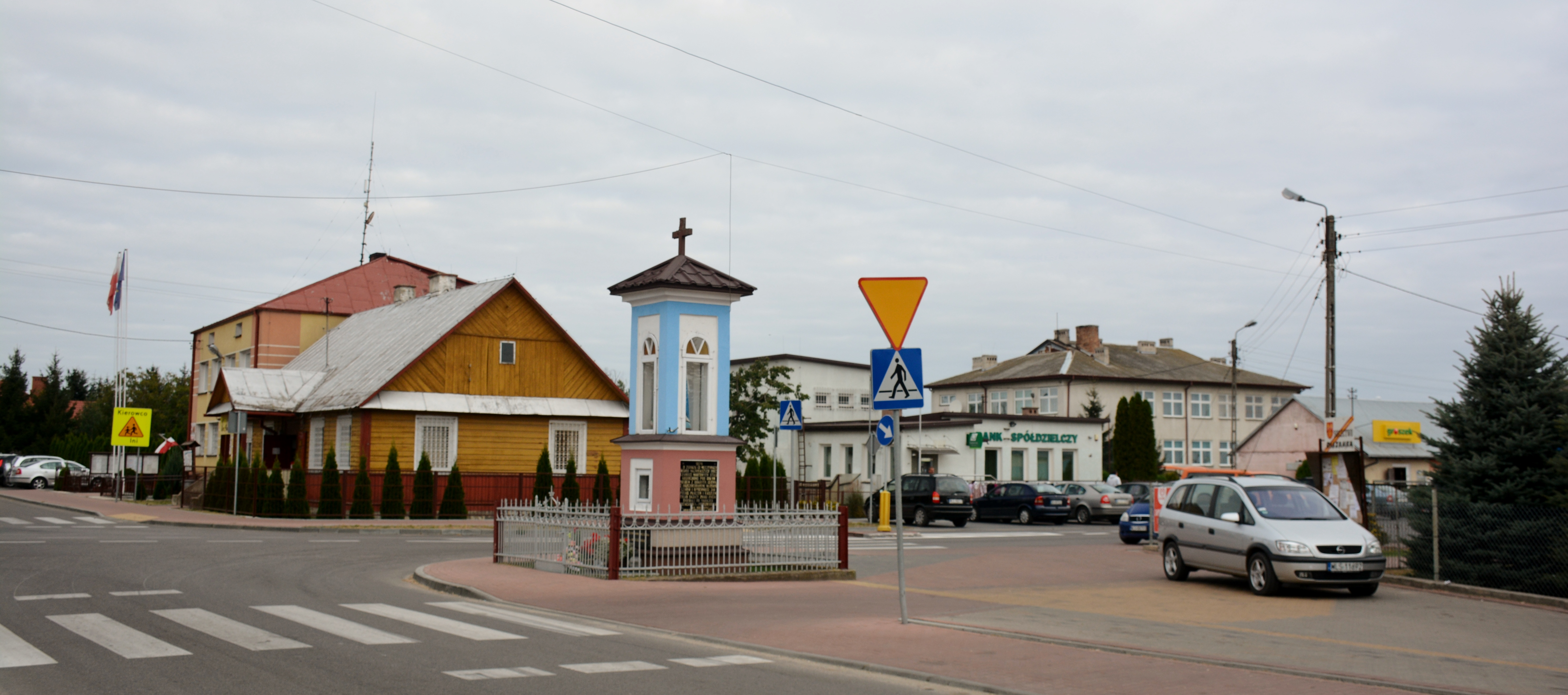
- Center of the village

- Location within Poland
- Coordinates: 52°9′N 22°40′E
- Country: Poland
- Voivodeship: Masovian
- County: Łosice
- Gmina: Olszanka

Population
  - Total: 375

Olszanka [ɔlˈʂanka] is a village in Łosice County, Masovian Voivodeship, in east-central Poland. It is the seat of the gmina (administrative district) called Gmina Olszanka.
