= Zakanale =

- Village
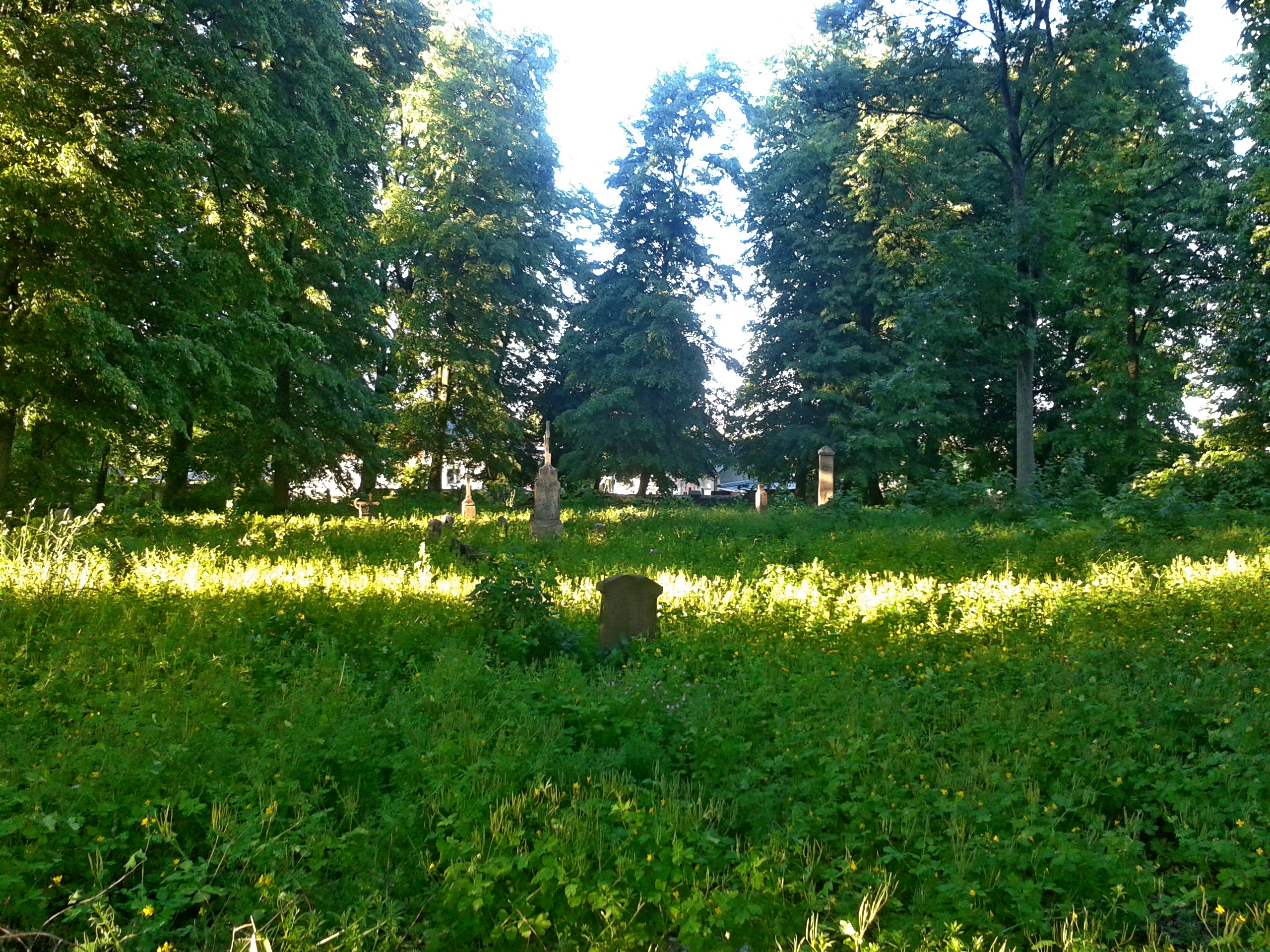

- Location within Poland
- Coordinates: 52°12′N 23°6′E
- Country: Poland
- Voivodeship: Lublin
- County: Biała
- Gmina: Konstantynów
- Time zone: UTC+1 (CET)
  - Summer (DST): UTC+2 (CEST)

Zakanale [zakaˈnalɛ] is a village in the administrative district of Gmina Konstantynów, within Biała County, Lublin Voivodeship, in eastern Poland.

== History ==
Three Polish citizens were murdered by Nazi Germany in the village during World War II.
