= Nowe Łepki =

Village in Gmina Olszanka, Poland

- Village
- Location within Poland
- Coordinates: 52°10′53″N 22°40′33″E
- Country: Poland
- Voivodeship: Masovian
- County: Łosice
- Gmina: Olszanka

Nowe Łepki [ˈnɔvɛ ˈwɛpki] is a village in the administrative district of Gmina Olszanka, within Łosice County, Masovian Voivodeship, in east-central Poland.
