= Bonin, Masovian Voivodeship =

Bonin
- Village
- Location within Poland
- Coordinates: 52°15′N 23°2′E
- Country: Poland
- Voivodeship: Masovian
- County: Łosice
- Gmina: Sarnaki

Bonin [ˈbɔnin] is a village in the administrative district of Gmina Sarnaki, within Łosice County, Masovian Voivodeship, in east-central Poland.
