= Zakalinki-Kolonia =

- Village
- Location within Poland
- Coordinates: 52°12′04″N 23°03′06″E
- Country: Poland
- Voivodeship: Lublin
- County: Biała
- Gmina: Konstantynów

Zakalinki-Kolonia [zakaˈlʲiŋkʲi kɔˈlɔɲa] is a village in the administrative district of Gmina Konstantynów, within Biała County, Lublin Voivodeship, in eastern Poland.
