= Grzybów, Łosice County =

Grzybów
- Village
- Location within Poland
- Coordinates: 52°18′05″N 22°52′04″E
- Country: Poland
- Voivodeship: Masovian
- County: Łosice
- Gmina: Sarnaki

Grzybów [ˈɡʐɨbuf] is a village in the administrative district of Gmina Sarnaki, within Łosice County, Masovian Voivodeship, in east-central Poland.
