= Boning =

Boning, Böning or Boening may refer to

== Actions and objects ==
- Boning (also deboning), removing the bones from a carcass in butchering
- Boning (baseball), rubbing a bat with bone
- Boning, vulgar slang for sexual intercourse
- Boning (corsetry), the rigid parts of a corset

== People ==
- John Boning (1805–1879), English cricketer
- Wigald Boning (born 1967), German entertainer

== Places ==
- Boning Island in the Andaman Islands

== People named Böning or Boening ==
- Alfred Böning (1907–1984), German engineer
- Walter Böning (1894–1981), German fighter pilot
- Shane Van Boening (born 1983), American pool player
- Marie Boening Kendall (1885–1953), American painter

== See also ==
- Bonin (disambiguation)
