= Witoldów, Gmina Konstantynów =

Witoldów
- Village
- Location within Poland
- Coordinates: 52°13′N 23°7′E
- Country: Poland
- Voivodeship: Lublin
- County: Biała
- Gmina: Konstantynów

Witoldów (Polish pronunciation: [viˈtɔlduf]) is a village in the administrative district of Gmina Konstantynów, within Biała County, Lublin Voivodeship, in eastern Poland.
