= Wichowicze =

- Village
- Location within Poland
- Coordinates: 52°12′0″N 23°7′11″E
- Country: Poland
- Voivodeship: Lublin
- County: Biała
- Gmina: Konstantynów

Population
  - Total: 90

Wichowicze [vʲixɔˈvʲit͡ʂɛ] is a village in the administrative district of Gmina Konstantynów, within Biała County, Lublin Voivodeship, in eastern Poland.
