= Bonin-Ogródki =

Village in Gmina Sarnaki, Poland

- Village
- Location within Poland
- Coordinates: 52°13′51″N 23°0′41″E
- Country: Poland
- Voivodeship: Masovian
- County: Łosice
- Gmina: Sarnaki

Bonin-Ogródki [ˈbɔnin ɔˈɡrutki] is a village in the administrative district of Gmina Sarnaki, within Łosice County, Masovian Voivodeship, in east-central Poland.
