= Bonnin =

Bonnin is a surname. Notable people with the surname include:

- Bernard Bonnin (1939–2009), Spanish Filipino actor
- Gertrude Simmons Bonnin (1876–1938), Native American writer better known by her pen name Zitkala-Sa
- Liz Bonnin (born 1970), Irish television presenter
- Mark Bonnin AO, physician, co-founder of the Nature Foundation in South Australia in 1981
- Mary Bonnin, former Master Chief in the United States Navy

== See also ==
- Bonin (disambiguation)
