= Huszlew =

- Village
- Location within Poland
- Coordinates: 52°8′N 22°50′E
- Country: Poland
- Voivodeship: Masovian
- County: Łosice
- Gmina: Huszlew
- Population: 530

Huszlew [ˈxuʂlɛf] is a village in Łosice County, Masovian Voivodeship, in east-central Poland. It is the seat of the gmina (administrative district) called Gmina Huszlew.
