= Giovanni Bonini =

Italian painter

Giovanni Bonini or Giovani Bonini of Assisi (fl. 1321) was an Italian painter and mosaicist of the 14th century; born in Assisi, and working in the sculptures and windows of the Cathedral of Orvieto in the 1320s.
