= Elias Bonine =

American photographer (1843–1916)

- Born: 1843; Lancaster
- Died: 1916 (aged 72–73)
- Citizenship: America
- Occupation: Photographer
- Known for: Native Americans

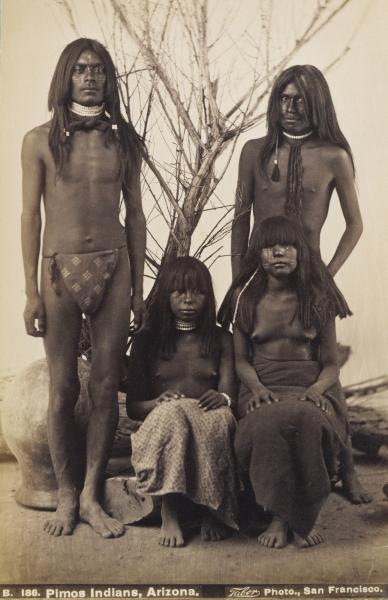
Elias A. Bonine and Isaiah West Taber; Pimos Indians, Arizona, ca.1875

Elias Atkinson Bonine (c. 1843–1916) was an American photographer. Bonine was known for his portraits of 19th-century Native Americans.

== Biography ==
Bonine was born in Lancaster, Pennsylvania in about 1843. Bonine had two brothers who were both photographers, Robert Atkinson Bonine (1836–1912) and Archibald Franklin Bonine (1846–1907). He had a 1848 degree in phrenology from a school named the Professional Class in Practical Phrenology in New York City.

Bonine was a prolific photographer of the indigenous peoples of North America, who he often staged in his photographs. He worked primarily in the carte-de-visite format. His work differed from that of anthropologists and government survey photographers, as his intended audience was the general public. He moved to California in 1876, and died in Pasadena, California in 1916.

His work is included in the collections of the Smithsonian American Art Museum, the Getty Museum, and the Museum of Fine Arts, Houston.
