= Bonini (surname) =

Bonini is an Italian surname. Notable people with the surname include:

- Alexander Bonini (c. 1270 – 1314), Italian Franciscan philosopher
- Antonio Bonini (born 1954), Italian volleyball player
- Arturo José Bonini (1943–2022), Argentine actor better known as Arturo Bonín
- Colin Bonini (born 1965), American politician
- Francesco Maria Bonini (1865–1930), Italian opera singer
- Giovanni Bonini, 14th-century Italian painter
- Giovanni Bonini (footballer) (born 1986), Sammarinese footballer
- Giuseppe Bonini, Italian middle-distance runner
- Girolamo Bonini (died 1680), Italian Baroque painter
- Massimo Bonini (born 1959), Sammarinese footballer and manager
- Nancy Bonini (born 1959), American neuroscientist and geneticist
- Oscar Bonini (born 1959), Argentine rower
- Severo Bonini (1582–1663), Italian classical composer, organist and music theorist
