= Gmina Sarnaki =

Gmina Sarnaki Sarnaki Commune
- Gmina
- Coat of arms
- Interactive map of Gmina Sarnaki
- Coordinates (Sarnaki): 52°19′N 22°53′E
- Country: Poland
- Voivodeship: Masovian
- County: Łosice
- Seat: Sarnaki

Area
  - Total: 197.3 km^{2} (76.2 sq mi)

Population (2014)
  - Total: 4,996
  - Density: 25.32/km^{2} (65.58/sq mi)
- Website: http://www.sarnaki.pl

Gmina Sarnaki is a rural gmina (administrative district) in Łosice County, Masovian Voivodeship, in east-central Poland. Its seat is the village of Sarnaki, which lies approximately 16 kilometres (10 mi) north-east of Łosice and 129 km (80 mi) east of Warsaw.

The gmina covers an area of 197.3 square kilometres (76.2 sq mi), and as of 2006 its total population is 5,250 (4,996 in 2014).

The gmina contains part of the protected area called Podlasie Bug Gorge Landscape Park.

== Villages ==
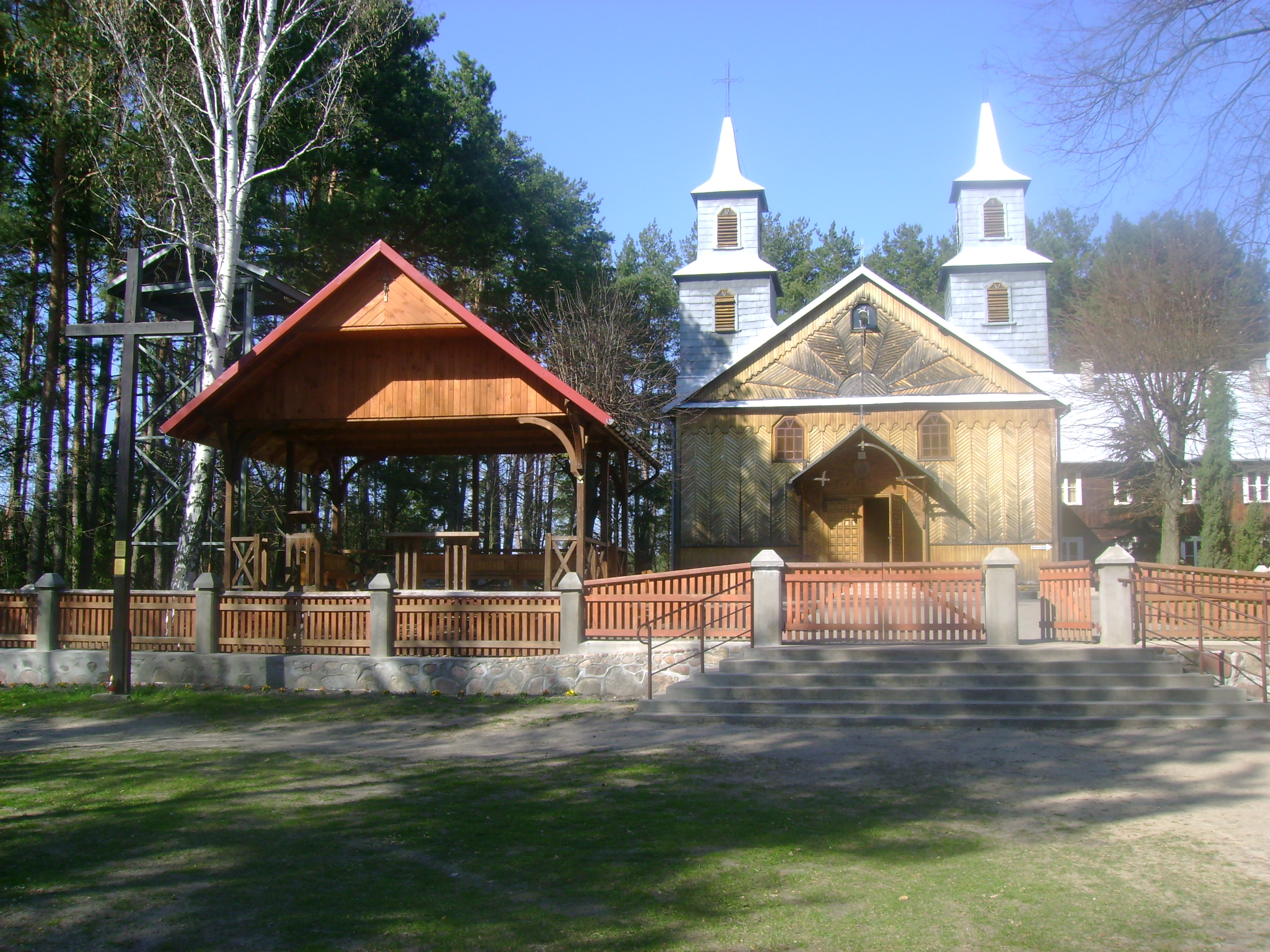
A photo of Capuchin Church in Serpelice

Gmina Sarnaki contains the villages and settlements of Binduga, Bonin, Bonin-Ogródki, Borsuki, Bużka, Chlebczyn, Chybów, Franopol, Grzybów, Hołowczyce-Kolonia, Horoszki Duże, Horoszki Małe, Klepaczew, Klimczyce, Klimczyce-Kolonia, Kózki, Mierzwice-Kolonia, Nowe Hołowczyce, Nowe Litewniki, Nowe Mierzwice, Płosków, Płosków-Kolonia, Raczki, Rozwadów, Rzewuszki, Serpelice, Stare Hołowczyce, Stare Litewniki, Stare Mierzwice, Terlików and Zabuże.

== Neighbouring gminas ==
Gmina Sarnaki is bordered by the gminas of Konstantynów, Mielnik, Platerów, Siemiatycze and Stara Kornica.
