= Sarnaki =

- Village
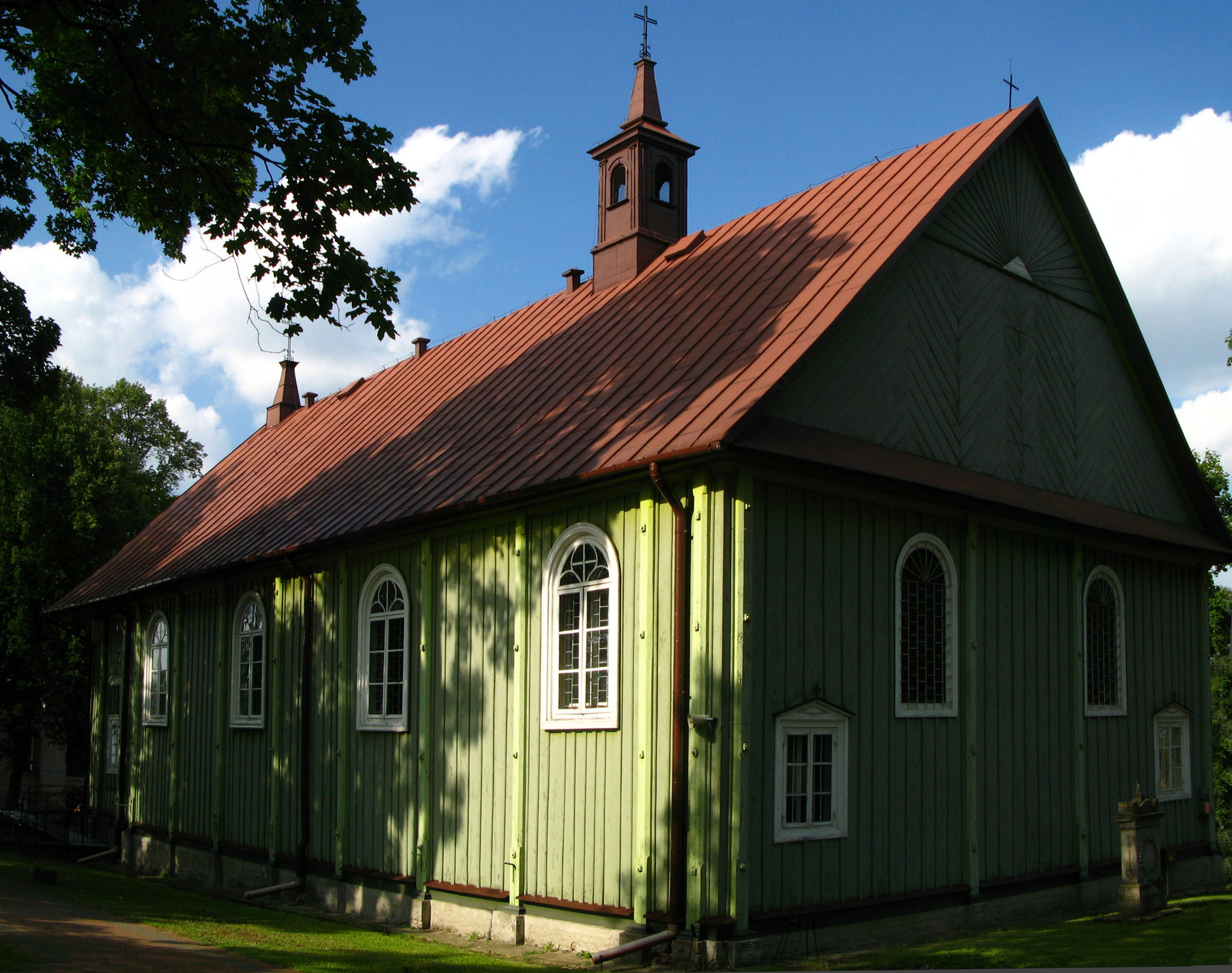
- Church of Saint Stanislaus

- Coat of arms

- Location within Poland
- Coordinates: 52°19′N 22°53′E
- Country: Poland
- Voivodeship: Masovian
- County: Łosice
- Gmina: Sarnaki

Population
  - Total: 1,194
- Time zone: UTC+1 (CET)
  - Summer (DST): UTC+2 (CEST)
- Website: http://www.sarnaki.pl/

Sarnaki [sarˈnaki] is a village in Łosice County, Masovian Voivodeship, in eastern Poland. It is the seat of the gmina (administrative district) called Gmina Sarnaki.

It was a private town, administratively located in the Mielnik County in the Podlaskie Voivodeship in the Lesser Poland Province of the Kingdom of Poland.
