= Łosice County =

Łosice County Powiat łosicki
- County
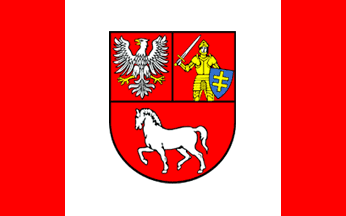
- Flag Coat of arms

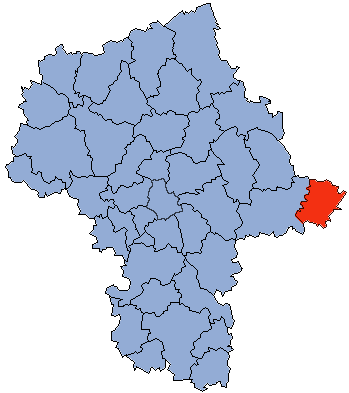
- Location within the voivodeship

- Division into gminas
- Coordinates (Łosice): 52°13′N 22°43′E
- Country: Poland
- Voivodeship: Masovian
- Seat: Łosice
- Gminas: Total 6: Gmina Huszlew; Gmina Łosice; Gmina Olszanka; Gmina Platerów; Gmina Sarnaki; Gmina Stara Kornica

Area
  - Total: 771.77 km^{2} (297.98 sq mi)

Population (2019)
  - Total: 30,895
  - Density: 40.031/km^{2} (103.68/sq mi)
  - Urban: 7,049
  - Rural: 23,846
- Car plates: WLS
- Website: www.losice.pl

Łosice County (Polish: powiat łosicki) is a unit of territorial administration and local government (powiat) in Masovian Voivodeship, east-central Poland. It came into being on 1 January 1999 as a result of the Polish local government reforms passed in 1998. Its administrative seat and only town is Łosice, which lies 118 kilometres (73 mi) east of Warsaw.

The county covers an area of 771.77 square kilometres (298.0 sq mi). As of 2019, its total population is 30,395, out of which the population of Łosice is 7,049 and the rural population is 23,846.

== Neighbouring counties ==
Łosice County is bordered by Siemiatycze County to the north, Biała County to the south-east and Siedlce County to the west.

== Administrative divisions ==
The county is subdivided into six gminas (one urban-rural and five rural). These are listed in the following table, in descending order of population.

Gmina	Type	Area (km^{2})	Population (2019)	Seat
Gmina Łosice	urban-rural	121.2	10,815	Łosice
Gmina Sarnaki	rural	197.3	4,673	Sarnaki
Gmina Platerów	rural	129.0	4,851	Platerów
Gmina Stara Kornica	rural	119.3	4,781	Stara Kornica
Gmina Olszanka	rural	87.3	2,961	Olszanka
Gmina Huszlew	rural	117.6	2,814	Huszlew
