= Błonie (disambiguation) =

Błonie is a town west of Warsaw, Poland.

Błonie may also refer to:

- Błonie, Kuyavian-Pomeranian Voivodeship (central Poland)
- Błonie, Lower Silesian Voivodeship (south-west Poland)
- Błonie, Lesser Poland Voivodeship (south Poland)
- Błonie, Łęczyca County in Łódź Voivodeship (central Poland)
- Błonie, Radomsko County in Łódź Voivodeship (south-central Poland)
- Błonie, Lubusz Voivodeship (west Poland)
- Błonie, Lublin Voivodeship (east Poland)
- Błonie, Piaseczno County in Masovian Voivodeship (east-central Poland)
- Błonie, Subcarpathian Voivodeship (south-east Poland)
- Błonie, Świętokrzyskie Voivodeship (south-central Poland)
