= Popielarnia =

Popielarnia may refer to the following places:

- Popielarnia, Łódź Voivodeship (central Poland)
- Popielarnia, Lublin Voivodeship (east Poland)
- Popielarnia, Gmina Ostrów Mazowiecka, Ostrów County in Masovian Voivodeship (east-central Poland)
- Popielarnia, Żyrardów County in Masovian Voivodeship (east-central Poland)
