= Oblonsky =

Oblonsky (masculine), Oblonskaya (feminine) is a Russian-language surname (see "Blonsky" for its etymology). Notable people with this surname include:

- Raisa Oblonskaya (1924-2010), Russian writer
- Shane Oblonsky (born 1985), American kickboxer
- Prince Stepan (Stiva) Oblonsky, a character from Anna Karenina
- Prince Serge Oblonsky, a character from The Chess Player (1938 film)

== See also ==
- Mirosław Obłoński
- Obolonsky
