= Rogi =

Rogi may refer to the following places:

- Rogi, Lesser Poland Voivodeship (south Poland)
- Rogi, Łódź Voivodeship (central Poland)
- Rogi, Subcarpathian Voivodeship (south-east Poland)
- Rogi, Lubusz Voivodeship (west Poland)
- Rogi, Opole Voivodeship (south-west Poland)
- Rogi, Croatia, a village near Skrad

or:

- Rugii, Germanic tribe
