= Anna Louisa Karsch =

German poet (1722–1791)

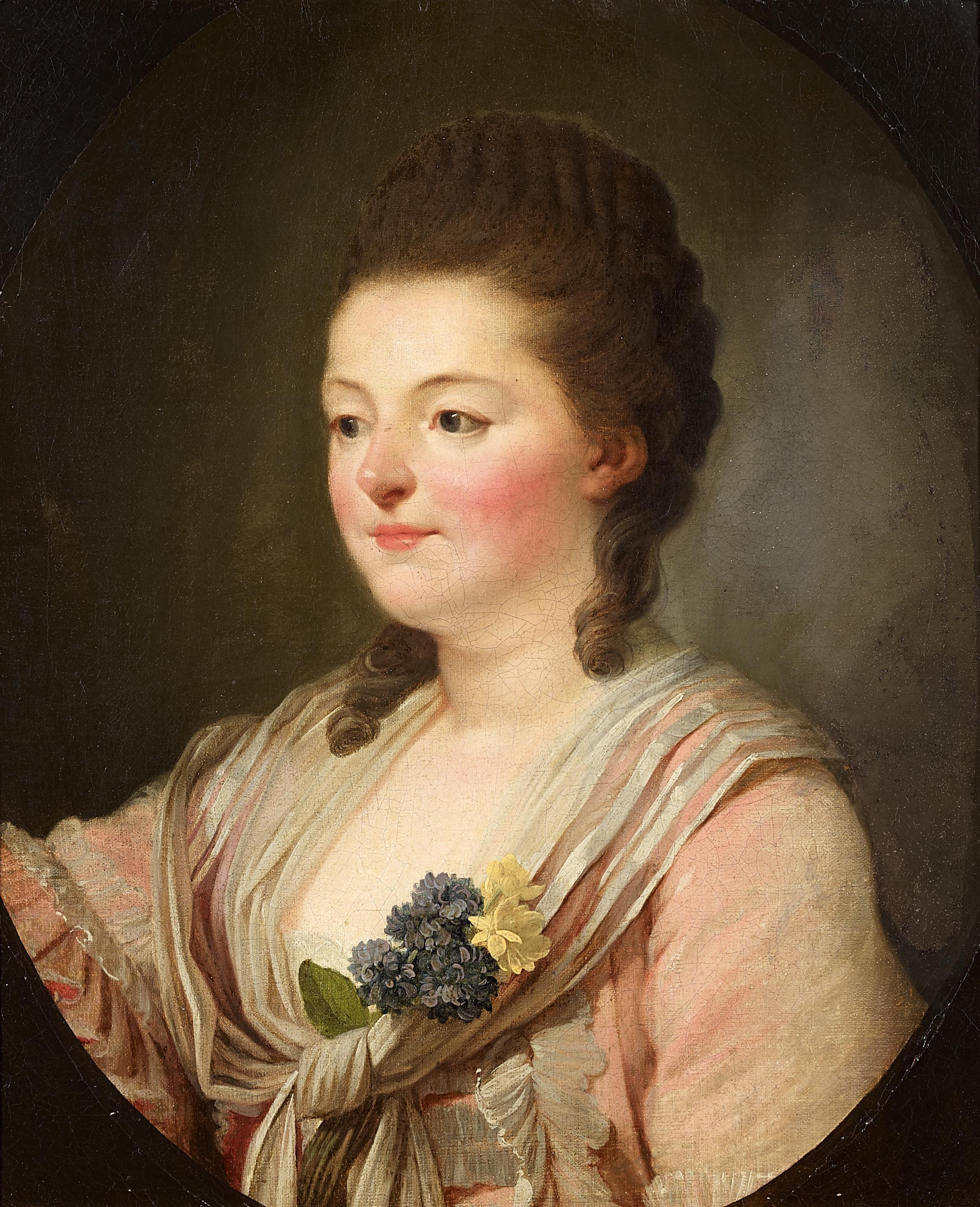
Portrait of Anna Louisa Karsch

Anna Louisa Karsch (1 December 1722 in Hammer, Silesia – 12 October 1791 in Berlin) was a German autodidact and poet from the Silesia region, known to her contemporaries as "Die Karschin" and "the German Sappho". She became the first German woman to "live from the proceeds of her own literary works."

== Biography ==
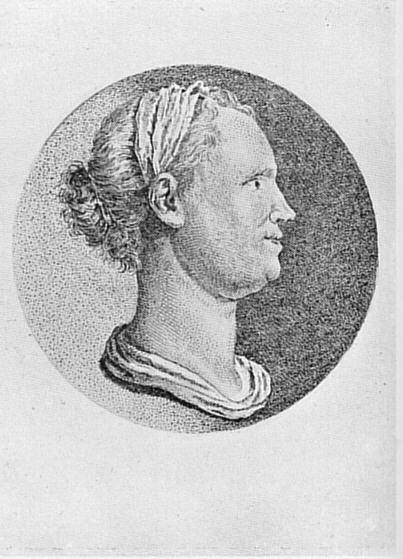
Anna Louisa Karsch

=== Early life ===
Anna Louisa Karsch was born on a dairy farm. Her father was a beer brewer and her mother was an innkeeper. At six, she was taken away by a great uncle who taught her to read and write in German and as much Latin as he knew. When Karsch's father died, her mother took her back in with the family and introduced the new step-father. The step-father moved the family to Trzciel, Poland, where Karsch worked as a cradle rocker, cowherder, and a house maid to a middle class woman. During this time, Karsch met a sheepherder who supplied her with books. Her step-father, unhappy with her reading, hit her for her "Lesesucht" which in German means reading mania. From then on Karsch read in secret. In 1738 at the age of 16 she married a weaver named Hiersekorn and bore two children. In 1745, while pregnant with her third baby Karsch was granted the first divorce in Prussia. The divorce left her penniless, encouraged by her mother Karsch married again. This time to an alcoholic tailor named Karsch. Her second husband took her to central Poland and then on to Wschowa in western Poland. Karsch's husband spent most of his time drinking and worked very little.

=== Becoming a poet ===
Karsch wrote a poem for a widow and daughter of an innkeeper. At the funeral, a relative saw this poem and refused to accept a woman could have written it. The family brought him to meet Karsch who impressed him a great deal. The relative gave Karsch a collection of poetry books. "She began to compose Gelegenheitsdichtungen for weddings and various local celebrations." Her poems appeared in local newspapers in Silesia and she developed a group of followers who were mostly Lutheran pastors and their wives. Her poetic talents grew in the cultural circles of the pastors' houses. Her poems grew large followings which brought connections, enough to support her family's financial struggles. In January 1760, Karsch arranged for her abusive, alcoholic husband to be pressed into the Prussian Army. This left Anna Louisa Karsch with the freedom to achieve higher. At the time of the Prussian campaign against Austria in Silesia, known as the Silesian Wars, Karsch wrote positively on the Prussian King — Frederick. Karsch and King Frederick unintentionally met, inspiring Karsch to write about his victories. These works were well received and she was invited to the richest, most influential houses of the area.

Karsch's two youngest children died during this time. Her grief for them, fear of wartime, and despair of financial difficulties led her to writing, "Klagen einer Witwe" (A Widow's Sorrow). In 1761, a Prussian General loved the poem so much he took Karsch and her daughter to stay with his wife in Berlin and gave Karsch's son a position at a country estate. She was passed along from aristocratic salon to another getting to know Prussia's literary elite. The literary nobility were impressed with her work, Moses Mendelssohn spoke highly of Karsch. There in Berlin she received her title, "the German Sappho", from mentor and model, Johann Wilhelm Ludwig Gleim. "The German Sappho", is a reference to the archaic Greek poet, Sappho, who wrote lyric poetry. Karsch fell in love with Gleim, who could not return her affections. However, Gleim published two volumes of her poetry, in 1764 and 1772. Karsch's correspondence, particularly her letters to Gleim, is often seen as another of her literary accomplishments.

Following invitations, she traveled to Magdeburg and Halberstadt. Karsch worked on a Passions-kantate with the king's sister in Magdeburg. It was there Karsch hit her highest peak of popularity, "Karsch presented herself successfully as an autodidact, as a "Naturdichterin". Frederick II agreed to give her a pension and build a house for her but her novelty at court waned and she descended into poverty. On the death of the king she approached his successor, Friedrich Wilhelm II in 1787, and he agreed to fill the promise, calling her "Deutschlands Dichterin" — Germany's poet. A house was built for Karsch, and she lived there, continuing to compose poetry, until her death in 1791. Her memorial is to be seen on the exterior wall of Berlin's Sophienkirche.

Her daughter Caroline Louise von Klencke became a respected poet and dramatist, and her granddaughter Helmina von Chézy (1783–1856), born Wilhelmine von Klencke in Berlin, became an author, whose play Rosamunde (1823) is remembered because Franz Schubert wrote instrumental music for it; she was also the librettist for Carl Maria von Weber's Euryanthe.

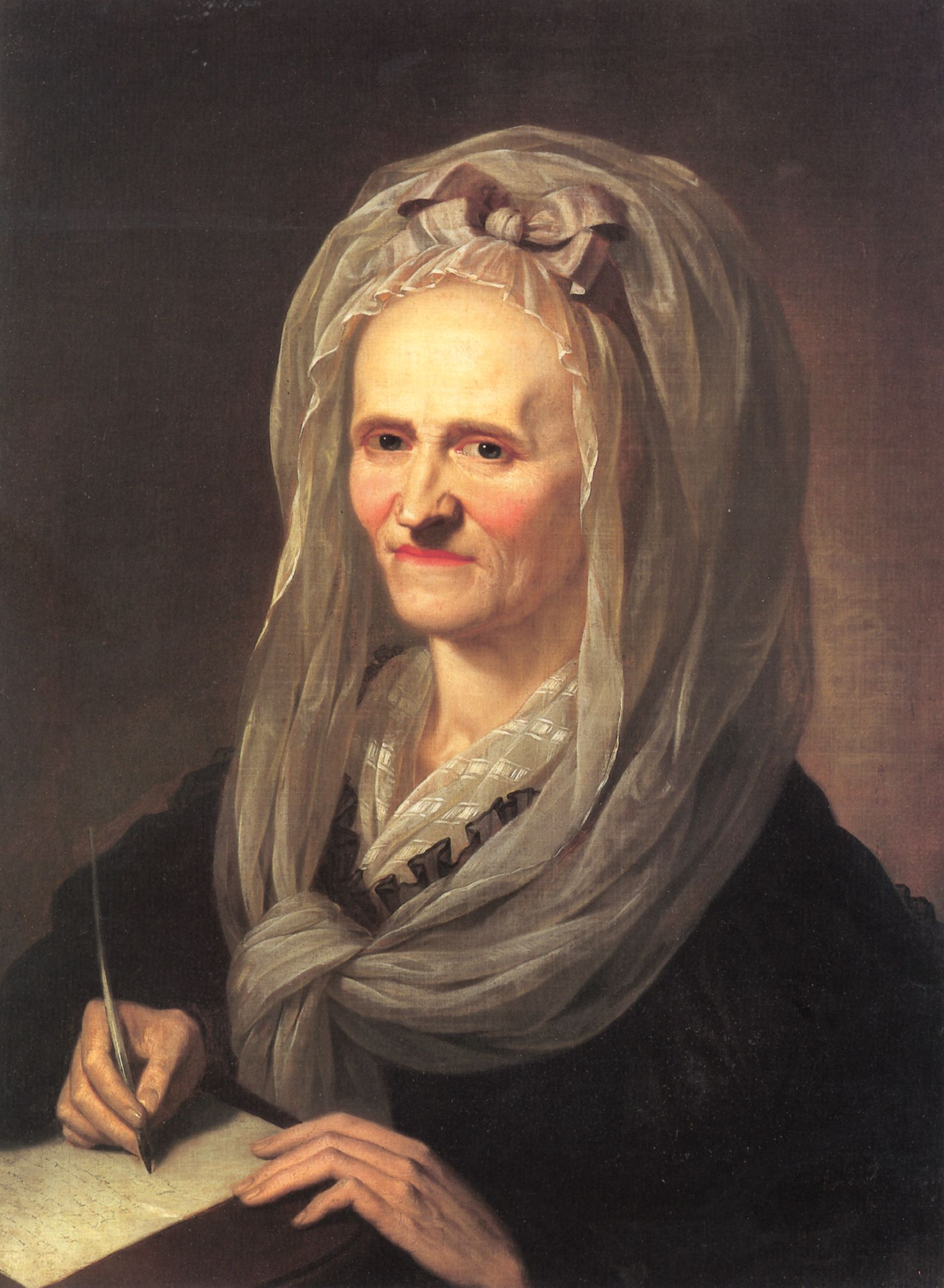
Anna Louisa Karsch portrait by Karl Christian Kehrer, 1791

== Works ==
Anna Louisa Karsch's published works as cited by An Encyclopedia of Continental Women Writers.

- Auserlesene Gedichte [Selected Poems] (1764)
- Einige Oden über verschiedene hohe Gegenstände [Some Odes About Various High Subjects] (1764)
- Poetische Einfälle. Erste Sammlung [Poetic Ideas, First Collection] (1764)
- Kleinigkeiten [Trivialities] (1765)
- Neue Gedichte [New Poems] (1772)
- Gedichte [Poems] (1792), with biological sketch of her daughter.

== Notes ==
- Kord, S. (2003) Visionaries and window shoppers: Anna Louisa Karsch between bourgeois aesthetic theory and lower-class authorship. Article in Lessing Yearbook, XXXV. pp. 169–201. ISSN 0075-8833
- Biography: Short Biographical Sketch of A.L. Karsch (BYU Scholars Archive): http://scholarsarchive.byu.edu/sophsupp_gallery/49/
- Biography at ceryx.de (in German)
