= Kruszyna =

Kruszyna may refer to the following places in Poland:

- Kruszyna, Greater Poland Voivodeship (west-central Poland)
- Kruszyna, Łódź Voivodeship (central Poland)
- Kruszyna, Lublin Voivodeship (east Poland)
- Kruszyna, Lubusz Voivodeship (west Poland)
- Kruszyna, Garwolin County in Masovian Voivodeship (east-central Poland)
- Kruszyna, Radom County in Masovian Voivodeship (east-central Poland)
- Kruszyna, Opole Voivodeship (south-west Poland)
- Kruszyna, Pomeranian Voivodeship (north Poland)
- Kruszyna, Kościerzyna County in Pomeranian Voivodeship
- Kruszyna, Silesian Voivodeship (south Poland)
- Kruszyna, Subcarpathian Voivodeship (south-east Poland)
