= Obolonsky =

Obolonsky (masculine), Obolonskaya (feminine) is a Russian-language surname, see "Blonsky" for its etymology. Notable people with this surname include:

- Nikolai Obolonsky (1856-1913), Ukrainian (Russian Empire) professor of legal medicine, dean of the medical department, Kiev University
- Raisa Obolonsky (1924-2010), Russian writer
- Shane Obolonsky, Canadian kickboxer

== See also ==
- Mirosław Obłoński
- Oblonsky
- Obolonsky family (in Russian)
