= Błoński =

Błoński, feminine Błońska (plural: Błońscy) is a Polish-language toponymic surname associated with any of the places named Błonie, in particular, the city of Błonie. Błoński is a Polish nobility family name of the Biberstein coat of arms heraldic family, Lubicz coat of arms, Nałęcz coat of arms, and Prus coat of arms heraldic family.

Notable people with this surname include:

- Jan Błoński (1931 – 2009), Polish historian, literary critic, publicist and translator
- Jan Kidawa-Błoński (born 1953), Polish film director, producer and screenwriter
- Małgorzata Kidawa-Błońska (born 1957), Polish politician, film producer, and sociologist

== See also ==
- Blonsky
