= Pratkowice =

- Village
- Location within Poland
- Coordinates: 51°3′N 19°52′E
- Country: Poland
- Voivodeship: Łódź
- County: Radomsko
- Gmina: Wielgomłyny

Pratkowice [pratkɔˈvit͡sɛ] is a village in the administrative district of Gmina Wielgomłyny, with in Radomsko County, Łódź Voivodeship, in central Poland.
