= Rudka, Radomsko County =

Rudka
- Village
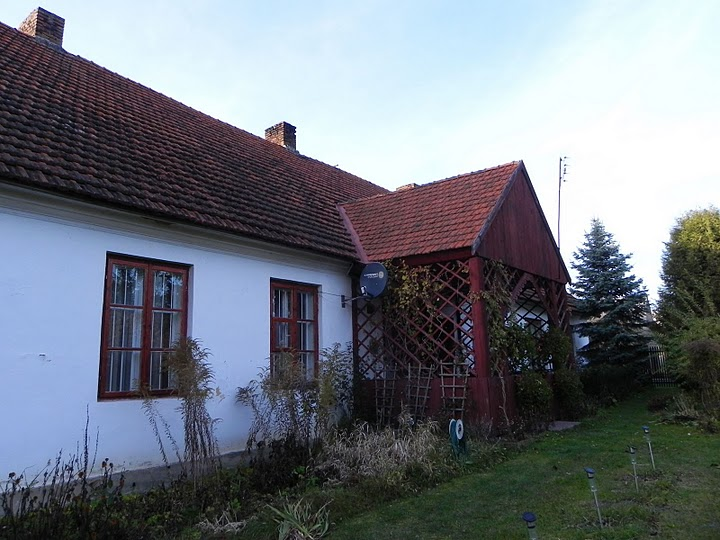

- Location within Poland
- Coordinates: 51°0′34″N 19°49′42″E
- Country: Poland
- Voivodeship: Łódź
- County: Radomsko
- Gmina: Wielgomłyny
- Population: 400

Rudka [ˈrutka] is a village in the administrative district of Gmina Wielgomłyny, within Radomsko County, Łódź Voivodeship, in central Poland.
