= Gmina Skąpe =

Gmina Skąpe Skąpe Commune
- Gmina
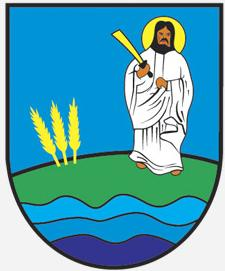
- Coat of arms

- Location within Poland
- Coordinates (Skąpe): 52°9′N 15°27′E
- Country: Poland
- Voivodeship: Lubusz
- County: Świebodzin
- Seat: Skąpe

Area
  - Total: 181.28 km^{2} (69.99 sq mi)

Population (2019-06-30)
  - Total: 5,067
  - Density: 27.95/km^{2} (72.39/sq mi)
- Website: www.skape.pl

Gmina Skąpe is a rural gmina (administrative district) in Świebodzin County, Lubusz Voivodeship, in western Poland. Its seat is the village of Skąpe, which lies approximately 13 kilometres (8 mi) south-west of Świebodzin, 24 km (15 mi) north of Zielona Góra, and 67 km (42 mi) south of Gorzów Wielkopolski.

The gmina covers an area of 181.28 square kilometres (70.0 sq mi), and as of 2019 its total population is 5,067.

The gmina contains part of the protected area called Gryżyna Landscape Park.

== Villages ==
Gmina Skąpe contains the villages and settlements of Błonie, Cibórz, Cząbry, Darnawa, Kalinowo, Kaliszkowice, Łąkie, Międzylesie, Niekarzyn, Niesulice, Ołobok, Pałck, Podła Góra, Przetocznica, Przetocznicki Młyn, Radoszyn, Rokitnica, Skąpe, Węgrzynice, Zawisze, and Złoty Potok.

== Neighbouring gminas ==
Gmina Skąpe is bordered by the gminas of Bytnica, Czerwieńsk, Łagów, Lubrza, Sulechów, and Świebodzin.
