= Kaliszkowice =

- Settlement
- Location within Poland
- Coordinates: 52°8′13″N 15°28′30″E
- Country: Poland
- Voivodeship: Lubusz
- County: Świebodzin
- Gmina: Skąpe
- Population: 11

Kaliszkowice [kaliʂkɔˈvit͡sɛ] is a settlement in the administrative district of Gmina Skąpe, within Świebodzin County, Lubusz Voivodeship, in western Poland.
