= Cząbry =

- Village
- Location within Poland
- Coordinates: 52°8′36″N 15°25′16″E
- Country: Poland
- Voivodeship: Lubusz
- County: Świebodzin
- Gmina: Skąpe
- Population: 7

Cząbry [ˈt͡ʂɔmbrɨ] is a village in the administrative district of Gmina Skąpe, within Świebodzin County, Lubusz Voivodeship, in western Poland.
