= Zawodzie, Radomsko County =

Zawodzie
- Village
- Location within Poland
- Coordinates: 51°3′N 19°44′E
- Country: Poland
- Voivodeship: Łódź
- County: Radomsko
- Gmina: Wielgomłyny

Zawodzie [zaˈvɔd͡ʑɛ] is a village in the administrative district of Gmina Wielgomłyny, within Radomsko County, Łódź Voivodeship, in central Poland.
