= Niwa Goszczowska =

- Village
- Location within Poland
- Coordinates: 51°02′44″N 19°45′13″E
- Country: Poland
- Voivodeship: Łódź
- County: Radomsko
- Gmina: Wielgomłyny

Niwa Goszczowska [ˈniva ɡɔʂˈt͡ʂɔfska] is a village in the administrative district of Gmina Wielgomłyny, within Radomsko County, Łódź Voivodeship, in central Poland.
