= Bieberstein =

Bieberstein is a German surname. Notable people with the surname include:

- Adolf Marschall von Bieberstein (1842–1912), German politician
- Adolph Bieberstein (1902–1981), American footballer
- Arno Bieberstein (1884–1918), German swimmer
- Friedrich August Marschall von Bieberstein (1768–1826) German botanist

The Marschall von Bieberstein family origins come from the region of Saxony in Eastern Germany. The current German family derives from the Bieberstein Castle near Dresden.

== See also ==
- Biberstein coat of arms
