= Bubel-Granna =

- Village
- Location within Poland
- Coordinates: 52°13′54″N 23°9′55″E
- Country: Poland
- Voivodeship: Lublin
- County: Biała
- Gmina: Janów Podlaski

Population
  - Total: 120

Bubel-Granna [ˈbubɛl ˈɡranna] is a village in the administrative district of Gmina Janów Podlaski, within Biała County, Lublin Voivodeship, in eastern Poland, close to the border with Belarus.
