= Wólka Bankowa =

- Village
- Location within Poland
- Coordinates: 51°2′30″N 19°42′58″E
- Country: Poland
- Voivodeship: Łódź
- County: Radomsko
- Gmina: Wielgomłyny

Wólka Bankowa [ˈvulka baŋˈkɔva] is a village in the administrative district of Gmina Wielgomłyny, within Radomsko County, Łódź Voivodeship, in central Poland.
