= Dębowiec, Łódź Voivodeship =

Dębowiec
- Village
- Location within Poland
- Coordinates: 51°3′16″N 19°42′40″E
- Country: Poland
- Voivodeship: Łódź
- County: Radomsko
- Gmina: Wielgomłyny

Dębowiec [dɛmˈbɔvjɛt͡s] is a village in the administrative district of Gmina Wielgomłyny, within Radomsko County, Łódź Voivodeship, in central Poland.
