= Zacisze, Radomsko County =

Zacisze
- Village
- Location within Poland
- Coordinates: 50°59′36″N 19°42′31″E
- Country: Poland
- Voivodeship: Łódź
- County: Radomsko
- Gmina: Wielgomłyny

Zacisze [zaˈt͡ɕiʂɛ] is a village in the administrative district of Gmina Wielgomłyny, within Radomsko County, Łódź Voivodeship, in central Poland.
