= Maksymów, Radomsko County =

Maksymów
- Village
- Location within Poland
- Coordinates: 50°58′3″N 19°43′51″E
- Country: Poland
- Voivodeship: Łódź
- County: Radomsko
- Gmina: Wielgomłyny

Maksymów [makˈsɨmuf] is a village in the administrative district of Gmina Wielgomłyny, within Radomsko County, Łódź Voivodeship, in central Poland.
