= Janów Podlaski =

- Town
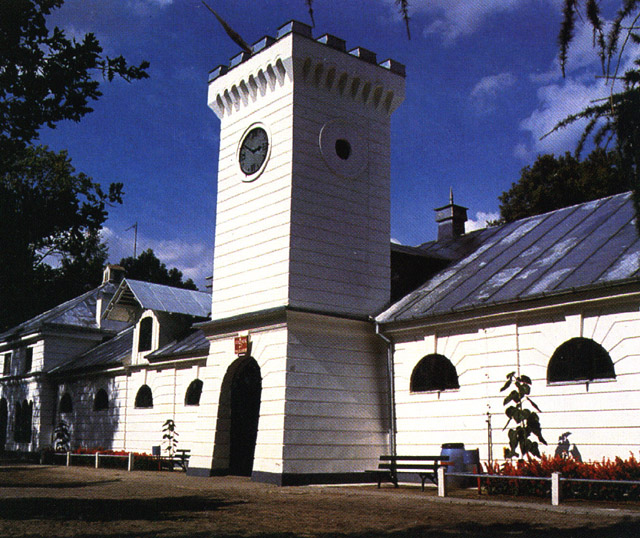
- Stables and horse breeding establishment

- Coat of arms

- Location within Poland
- Coordinates: 52°11′45″N 23°12′38″E
- Country: Poland
- Voivodeship: Lublin
- County: Biała
- Gmina: Janów Podlaski
- Town rights: 1465

Population
  - Total: 2,700
- Time zone: UTC+1 (CET)
  - Summer (DST): UTC+2 (CEST)
- Vehicle registration: LBI

Janów Podlaski (Polish: [ˈjanuf pɔdˈlaskʲi]) is a town in Biała County, Lublin Voivodeship, in eastern Poland, close to the border with Belarus. It is the seat of the gmina (administrative district) called Gmina Janów Podlaski.

== History ==
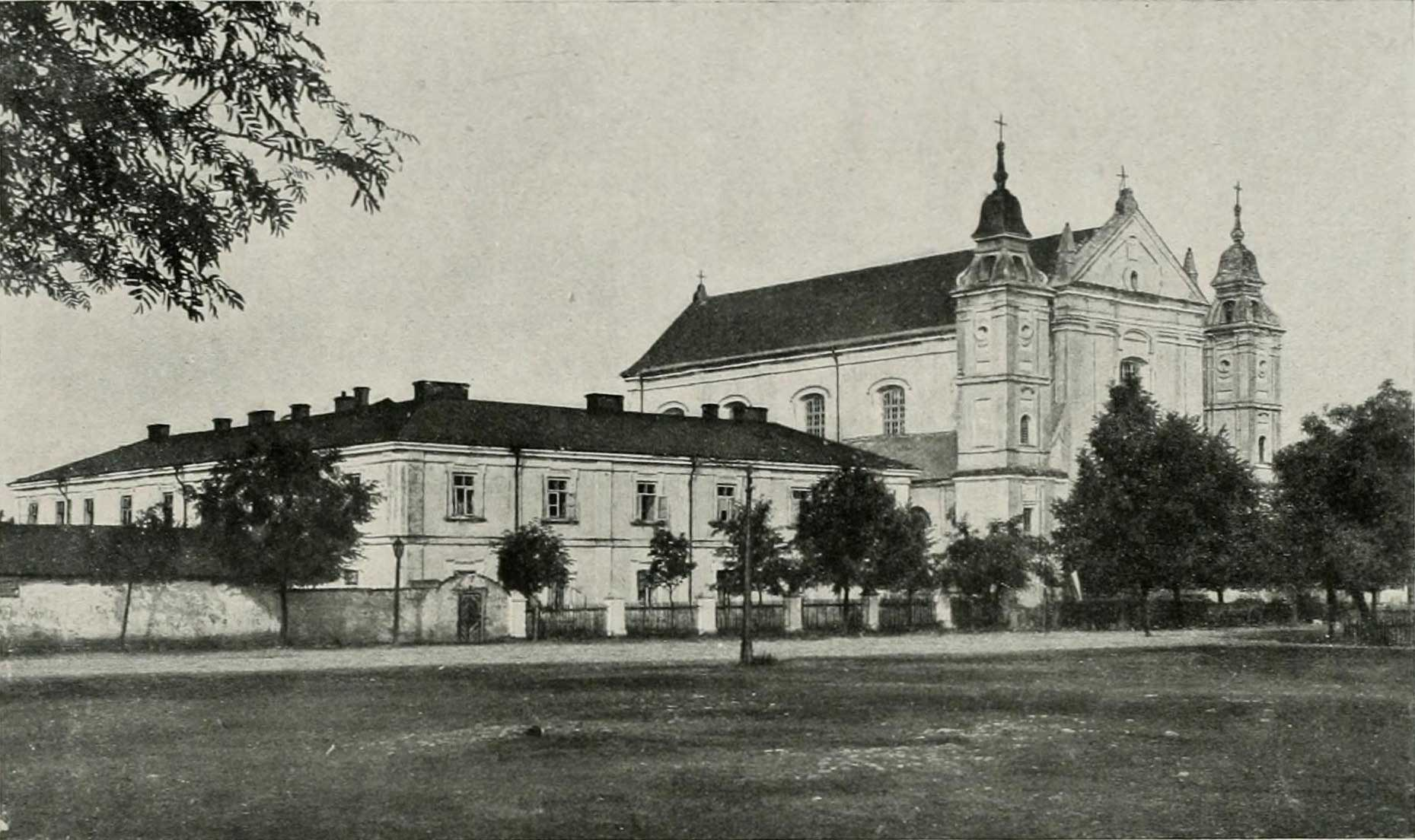
Janów in c. 1915

Since the early 14th century the settlement belonged to the Grand Duchy of Lithuania and the first church in the settlement was funded by the Lithuanian Grand Duke Vytautas the Great in 1428.

Because of the Tatars devastating attack on Lutsk, bishop Jonas I Losovičius in 1465 moved the main residence of the bishops of Lutsk to Janów where it remained until 1796. Moreover, he also renamed after his name the settlement to Janów Biskupi. It was granted town rights in 1465. In 1497 Alexander Jagiellon established three annual fairs. In 1685 Bishop Stanisław Witwicki founded the local seminary. In 1730, King Augustus II the Strong established a fourth fair.

== Sports ==
The local football team is Janowia Janów Podlaski.

== Stud farm ==
The state stud farm, called Janów Podlaski Stud Farm, or simply Janów, is a horse breeding establishment that specializes in the purebred Arabian horse.
