= Werchliś =

- Village
- Location within Poland
- Coordinates: 52°11′N 23°17′E
- Country: Poland
- Voivodeship: Lublin
- County: Biała
- Gmina: Janów Podlaski

Werchliś [ˈvɛrxlʲiɕ] is a village in the administrative district of Gmina Janów Podlaski, within Biała County, Lublin Voivodeship, in eastern Poland, close to the border with Belarus.
