= Grabowie =

- Village
- Location within Poland
- Coordinates: 51°22′17″N 18°55′53″E
- Country: Poland
- Voivodeship: Łódź
- County: Radomsko
- Gmina: Wielgomłyny

Grabowie [ɡraˈbɔvjɛ] is a village in the administrative district of Gmina Wielgomłyny, within Radomsko County, Łódź Voivodeship, in central Poland.
