= Trzebce =

- Village
- Location within Poland
- Coordinates: 51°3′N 19°49′E
- Country: Poland
- Voivodeship: Łódź
- County: Radomsko
- Gmina: Wielgomłyny

Trzebce [ˈtʂɛpt͡sɛ] is a village in the administrative district of Gmina Wielgomłyny, within Radomsko County, Łódź Voivodeship, in central Poland. The population of Trzebce is approximately 194 people.
