= Łąkie, Lubusz Voivodeship =

Łąkie
- Village
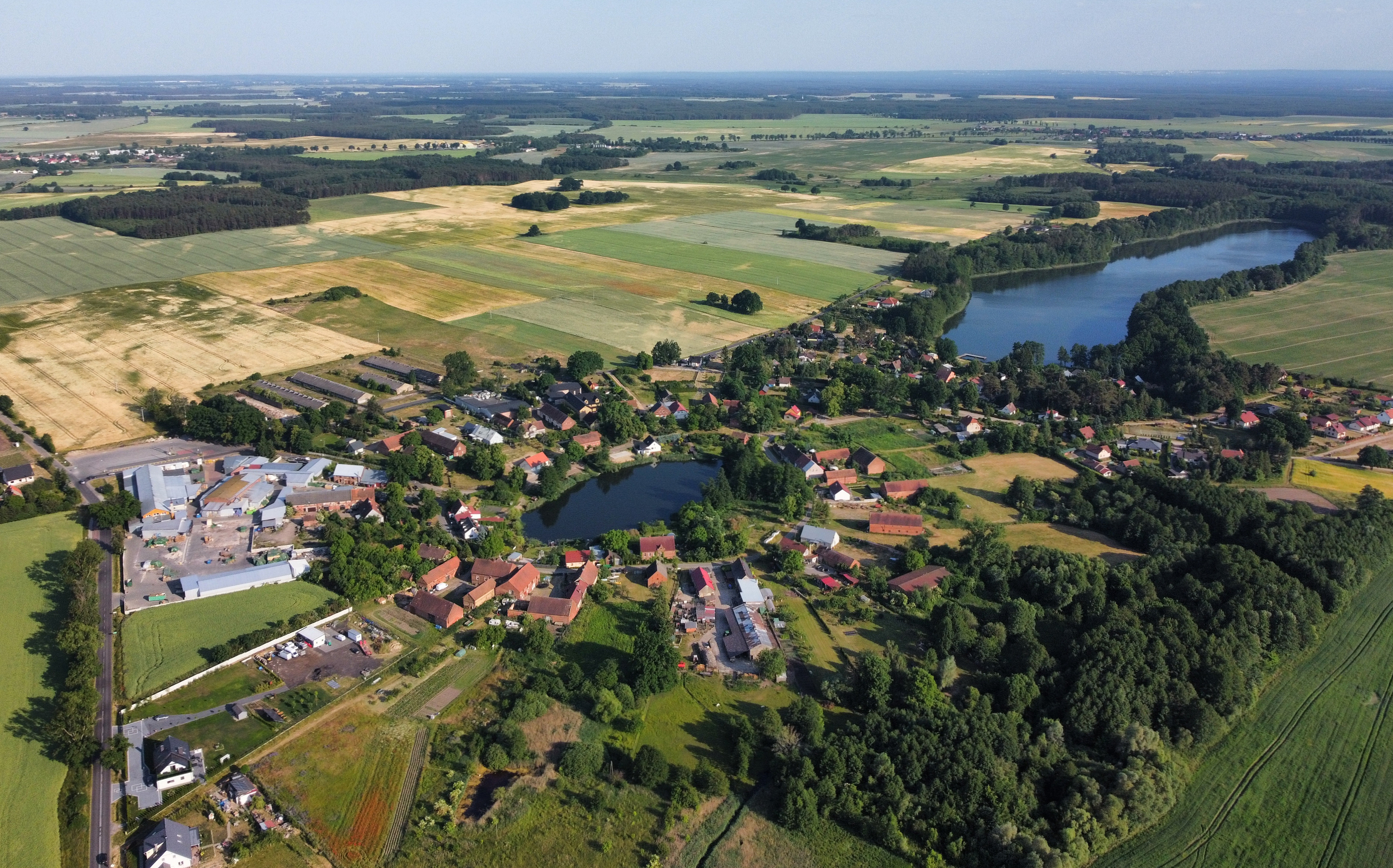

- Location within Poland
- Coordinates: 52°10′N 15°27′E
- Country: Poland
- Voivodeship: Lubusz
- County: Świebodzin
- Gmina: Skąpe

Population
  - Total: 149
- Time zone: UTC+1 (CET)
  - Summer (DST): UTC+2 (CEST)
- Vehicle registration: FSW

Łąkie [ˈwɔnkʲɛ] is a village in the administrative district of Gmina Skąpe, within Świebodzin County, Lubusz Voivodeship, in western Poland.
