= Niwa Zagórska =

- Village
- Location within Poland
- Coordinates: 51°02′47″N 19°44′42″E
- Country: Poland
- Voivodeship: Łódź
- County: Radomsko
- Gmina: Wielgomłyny

Niwa Zagórska [ˈniva zaˈɡurska] is a village in the administrative district of Gmina Wielgomłyny, within Radomsko County, Łódź Voivodeship, in central Poland.
