= Klonownica-Plac =

- Village
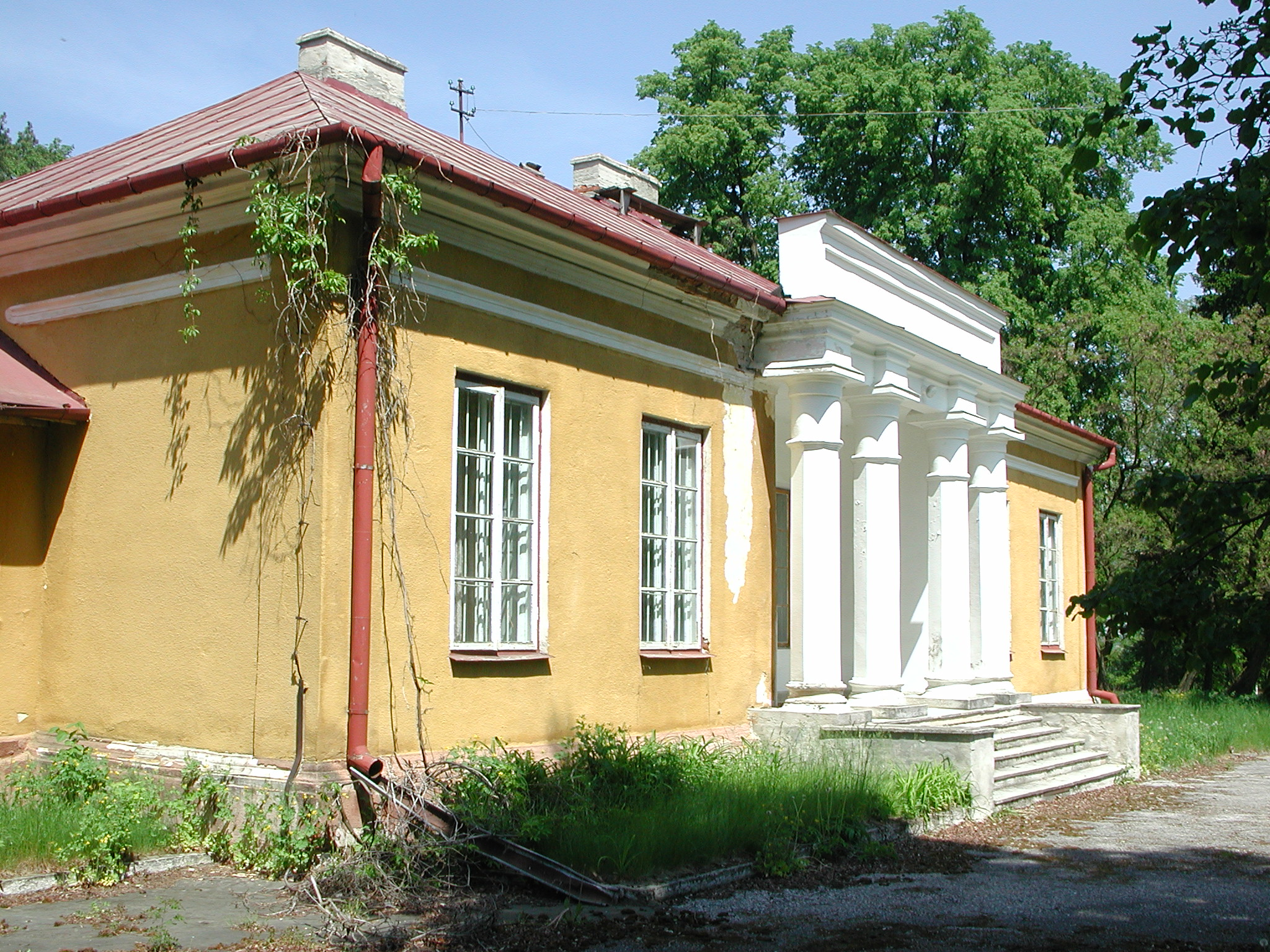

- Location within Poland
- Coordinates: 52°08′31″N 23°10′40″E
- Country: Poland
- Voivodeship: Lublin
- County: Biała
- Gmina: Janów Podlaski

Klonownica-Plac [klɔnɔvˈɲit͡sa ˈplat͡s] is a village in the administrative district of Gmina Janów Podlaski, within Biała County, Lublin Voivodeship, in eastern Poland, close to the border with Belarus.
