= Trzebce-Perzyny =

- Village
- Location within Poland
- Coordinates: 51°02′24″N 19°49′24″E
- Country: Poland
- Voivodeship: Łódź
- County: Radomsko
- Gmina: Wielgomłyny

Trzebce-Perzyny [ˈtʂɛpt͡sɛ pɛˈʐɨnɨ] is a village in the administrative district of Gmina Wielgomłyny, within Radomsko County, Łódź Voivodeship, in central Poland.
