= Karczów, Łódź Voivodeship =

Karczów
- Village
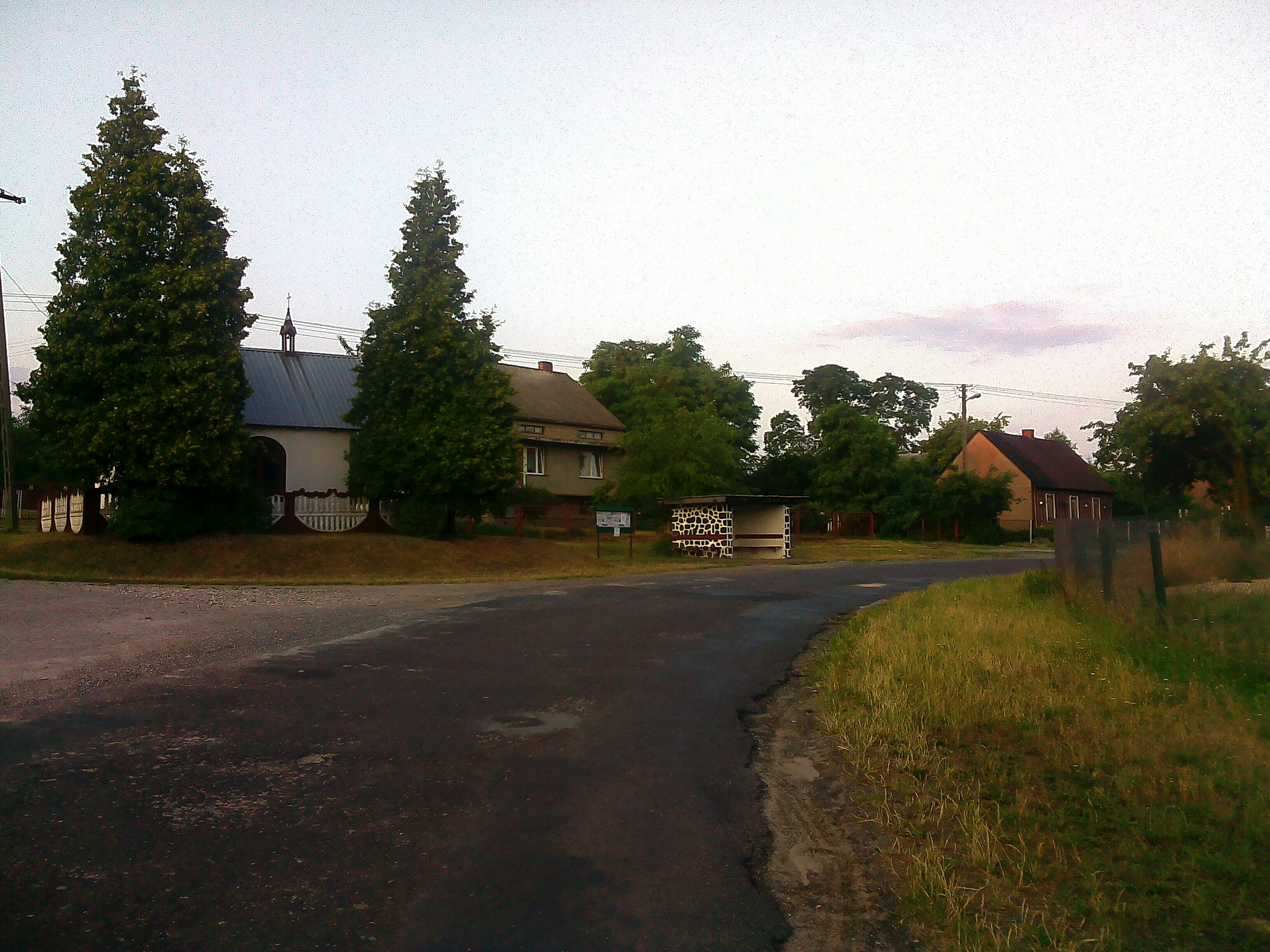

- Location within Poland
- Coordinates: 51°2′4″N 19°42′35″E
- Country: Poland
- Voivodeship: Łódź
- County: Radomsko
- Gmina: Wielgomłyny

Karczów [ˈkart͡ʂuf] is a village in the administrative district of Gmina Wielgomłyny, within Radomsko County, Łódź Voivodeship, in central Poland.
