= Gmina Janów Podlaski =

Gmina Janów Podlaski Janów Podlaski Commune
- Gmina
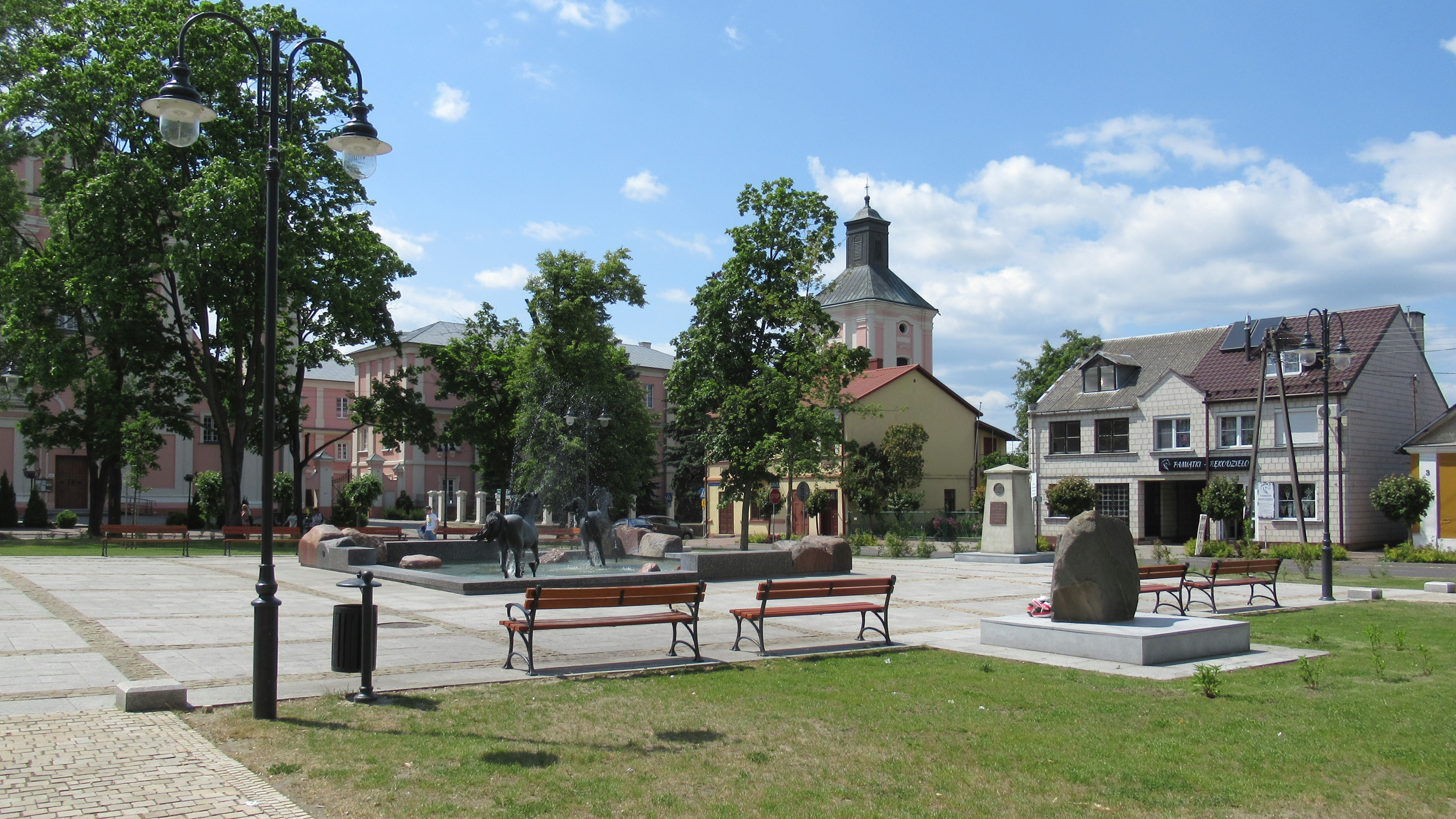

- Coat of arms

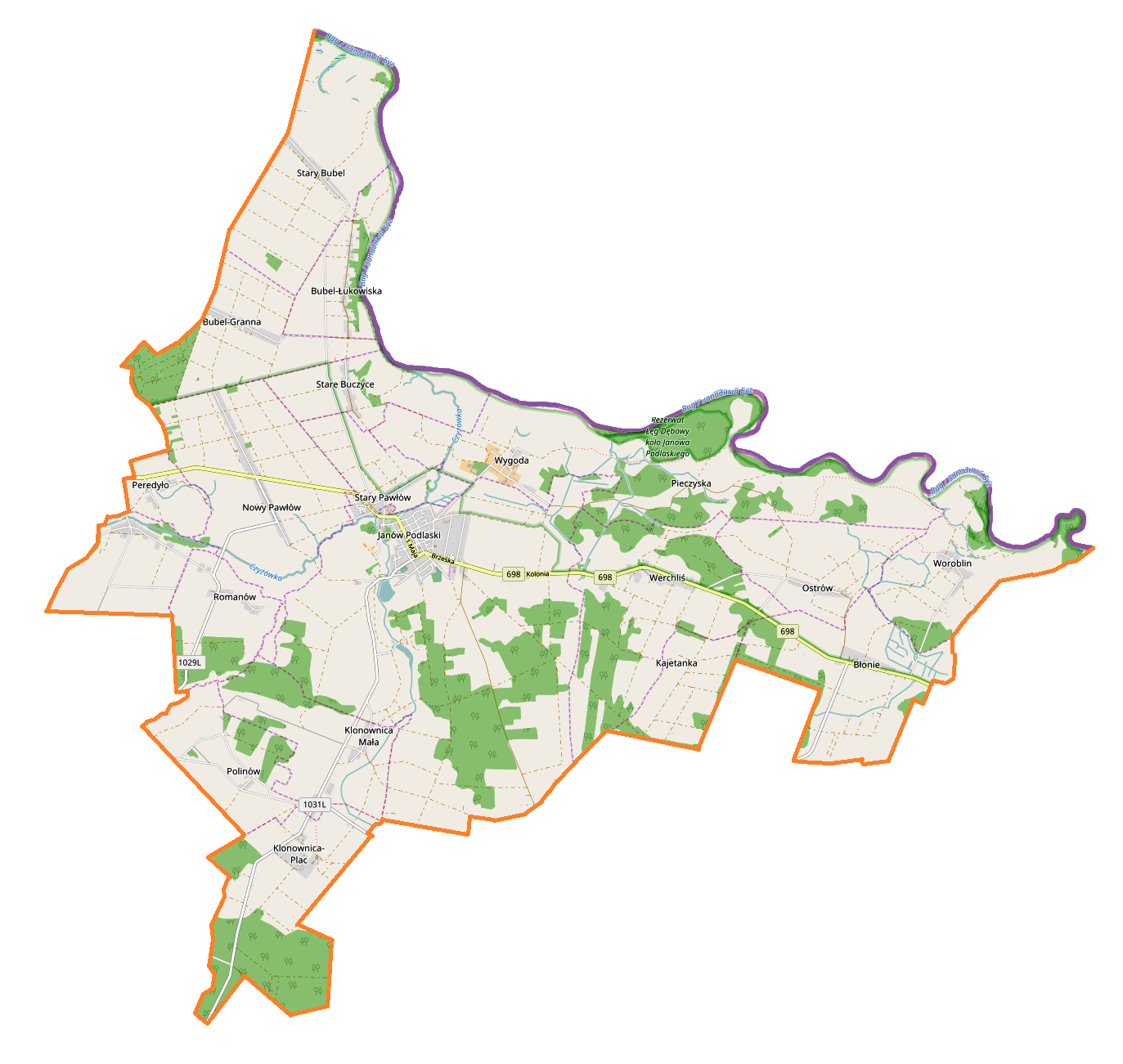

- Location within Poland
- Coordinates (Janów Podlaski): 52°11′45″N 23°12′38″E
- Country: Poland
- Voivodeship: Lublin
- County: Biała County
- Seat: Janów Podlaski

Area
  - Total: 135 km^{2} (52 sq mi)

Population (2014)
  - Total: 5,468
  - Density: 40.5/km^{2} (105/sq mi)
- Website: www.janowpodlaski.pl

Gmina Janów Podlaski is a rural gmina (administrative district) in Biała County, Lublin Voivodeship, in eastern Poland, on the border with Belarus. Its seat is the village of Janów Podlaski, which lies approximately 20 kilometres (12 mi) north of Biała Podlaska and 115 km (71 mi) north-east of the regional capital Lublin.

The gmina covers an area of 135 square kilometres (52.1 sq mi), and as of 2006 its total population is 5,553 (5,468 in 2014).

The gmina contains part of the protected area called Podlasie Bug Gorge Landscape Park.

== Villages ==
Gmina Janów Podlaski contains the villages and settlements of:

- Błonie
- Bubel-Granna
- Bubel-Łukowiska
- Jakówki
- Janów Podlaski
- Kajetanka
- Klonownica Mała
- Klonownica-Plac
- Nowy Pawłów
- Ostrów
- Peredyło
- Polinów
- Romanów
- Stare Buczyce
- Stary Bubel
- Stary Pawłów
- Werchliś
- Woroblin
- Wygoda

== Neighbouring gminas ==
Gmina Janów Podlaski is bordered by the gminas of Biała Podlaska, Konstantynów, Leśna Podlaska and Rokitno. It also borders Belarus.
