= Bubel-Łukowiska =

- Village
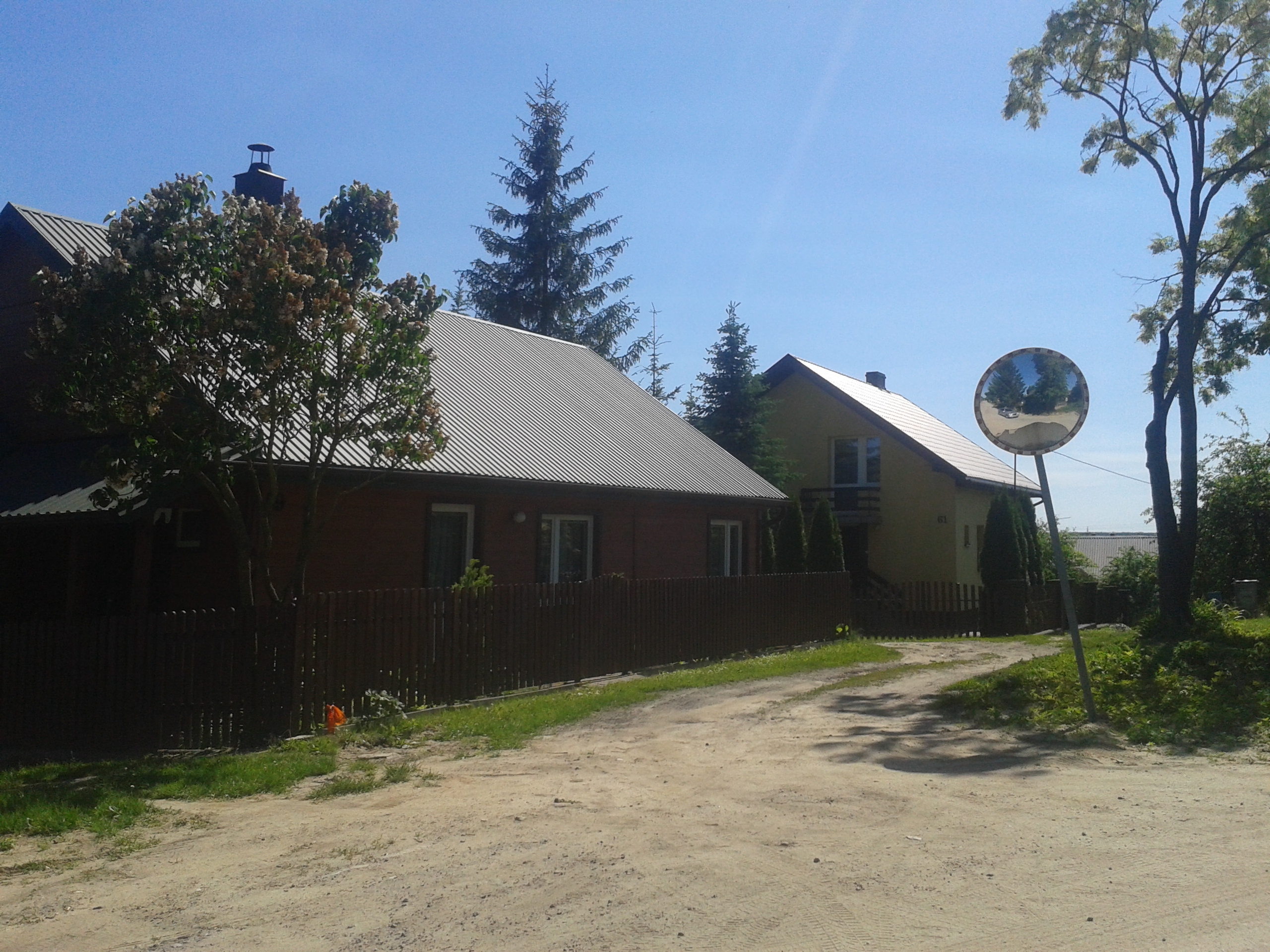

- Location within Poland
- Coordinates: 52°14′16″N 23°11′23″E
- Country: Poland
- Voivodeship: Lublin
- County: Biała
- Gmina: Janów Podlaski

Bubel-Łukowiska [ˈbubɛl wukɔˈvʲiska] is a village in the administrative district of Gmina Janów Podlaski, within Biała County, Lublin Voivodeship, in eastern Poland, close to the border with Belarus.
