= Kalinowo, Lubusz Voivodeship =

Kalinowo
- Village
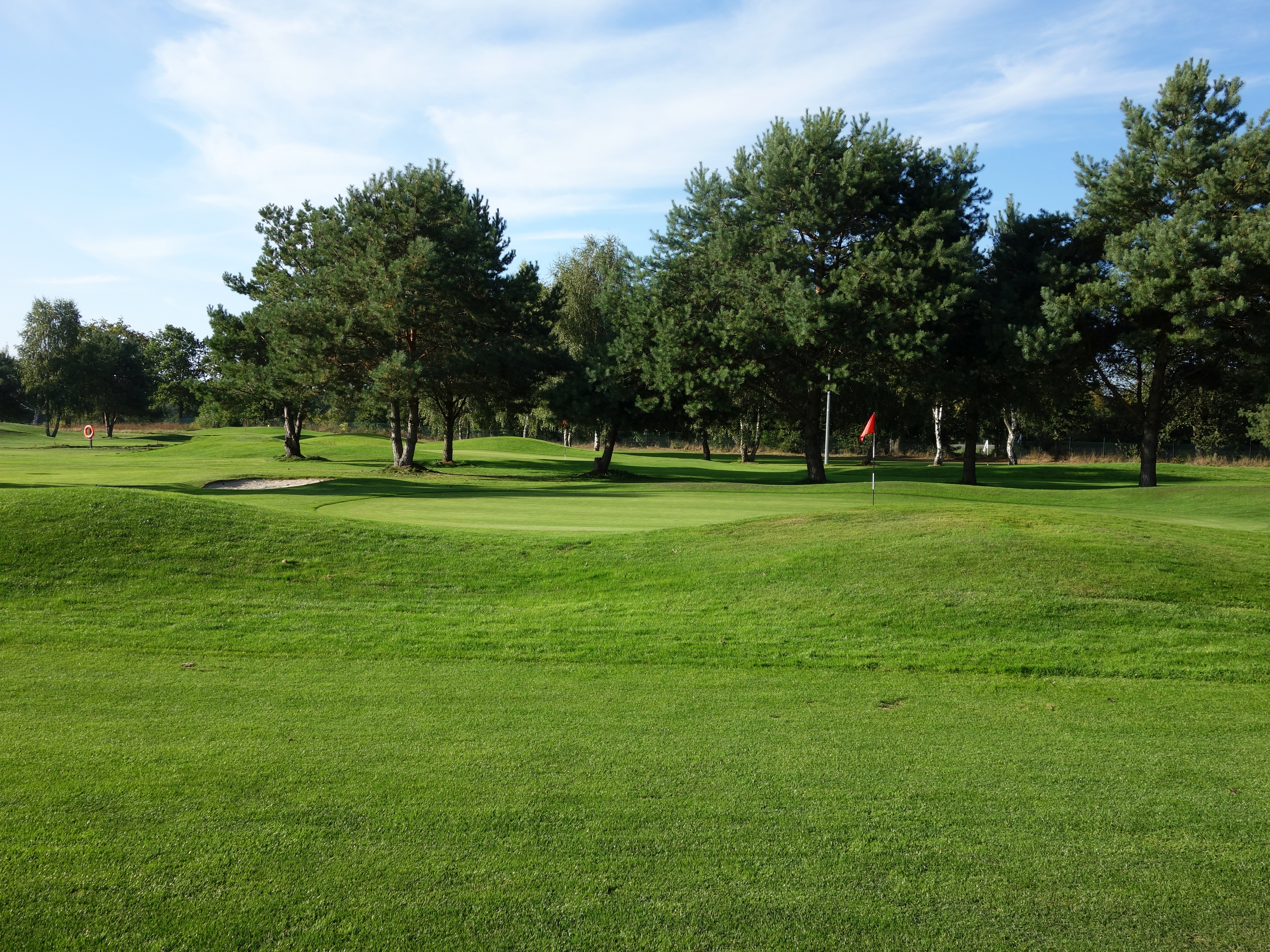

- Location within Poland
- Coordinates: 52°12′36″N 15°22′42″E
- Country: Poland
- Voivodeship: Lubusz
- County: Świebodzin
- Gmina: Skąpe
- Population: 124

Kalinowo [kaliˈnɔvɔ] is a village in the administrative district of Gmina Skąpe, within Świebodzin County, Lubusz Voivodeship, in western Poland.
