= Podła Góra =

- Village
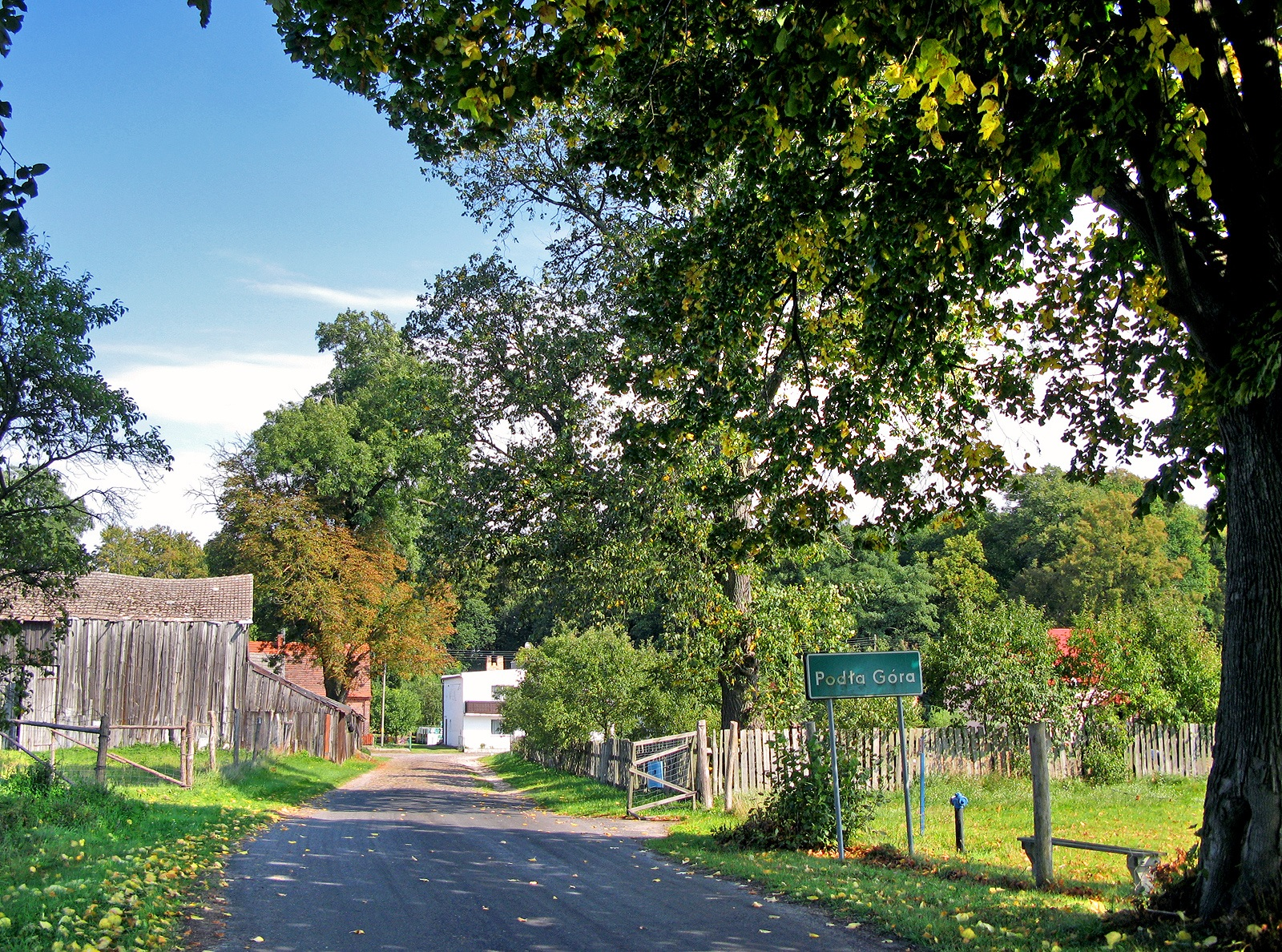

- Location within Poland
- Coordinates: 52°7′N 15°21′E
- Country: Poland
- Voivodeship: Lubusz
- County: Świebodzin
- Gmina: Skąpe
- Population: 171

Podła Góra [ˈpɔdwa ˈɡura] is a village in the administrative district of Gmina Skąpe, within Świebodzin County, Lubusz Voivodeship, in western Poland.
