= Skąpe, Lubusz Voivodeship =

Skąpe
- Village
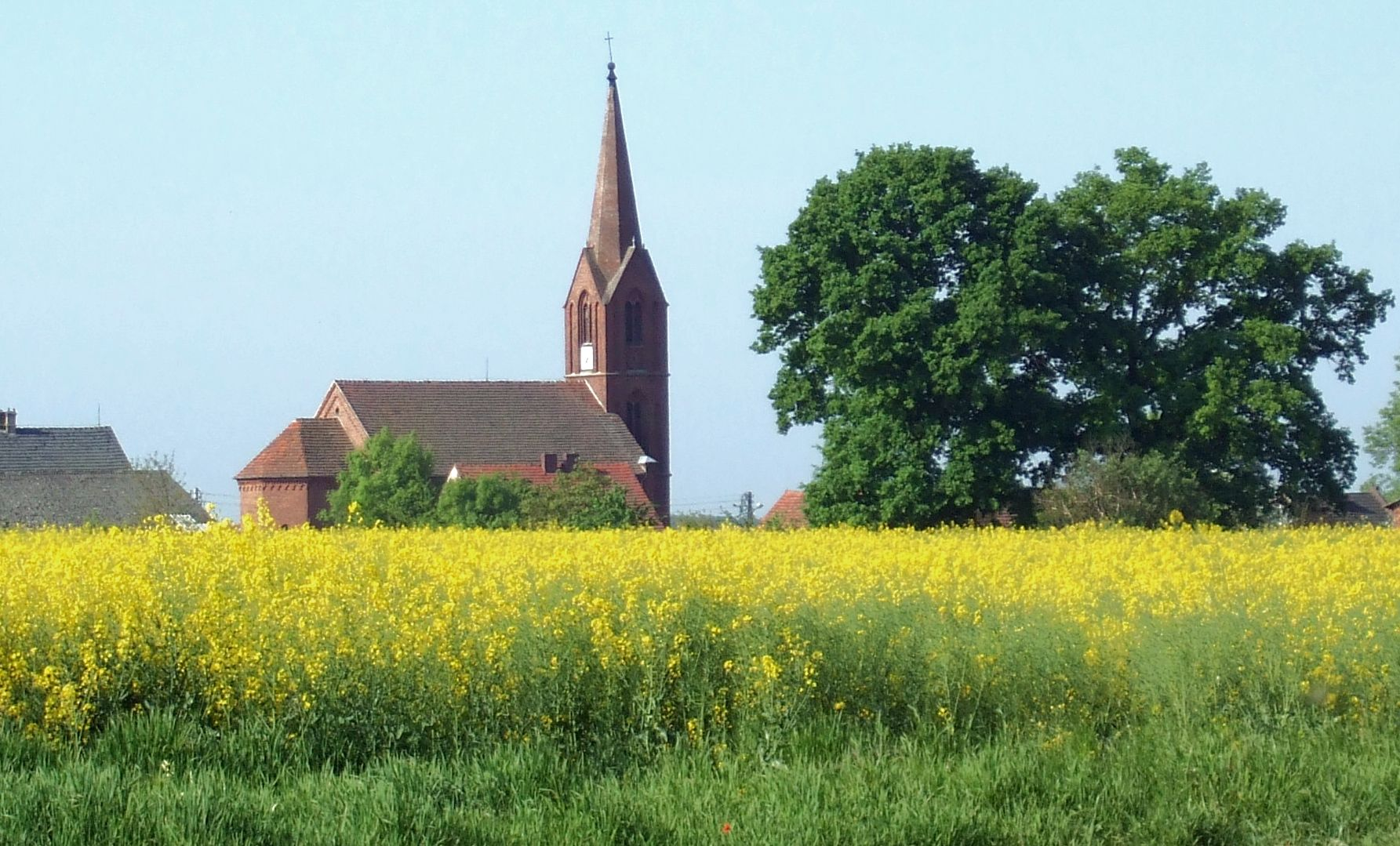
- Church of the Nativity of the Virgin Mary

- Location within Poland
- Coordinates: 52°9′N 15°27′E
- Country: Poland
- Voivodeship: Lubusz
- County: Świebodzin
- Gmina: Skąpe

Population
  - Total: 421

Skąpe [ˈskɔmpɛ] is a village in Świebodzin County, Lubusz Voivodeship, in western Poland. It is the seat of the gmina (administrative district) called Gmina Skąpe.
