= Ostrów, Gmina Janów Podlaski =

Ostrów
- Village
- Location within Poland
- Coordinates: 52°11′19″N 23°19′11″E
- Country: Poland
- Voivodeship: Lublin
- County: Biała
- Gmina: Janów Podlaski

Population
  - Total: 200

Ostrów [ˈɔstruf] is a village in the administrative district of Gmina Janów Podlaski, within Biała County, Lublin Voivodeship, in eastern Poland, close to the border with Belarus.
