= Przetocznicki Młyn =

- Settlement
- Location within Poland
- Coordinates: 52°7′28″N 15°25′14″E
- Country: Poland
- Voivodeship: Lubusz
- County: Świebodzin
- Gmina: Skąpe

Przetocznicki Młyn [pʂɛtɔt͡ʂˈnit͡ski ˈmwɨn] is a settlement in the administrative district of Gmina Skąpe, within Świebodzin County, Lubusz Voivodeship, in western Poland.
