= Sokola Góra, Radomsko County =

Sokola Góra
- Village
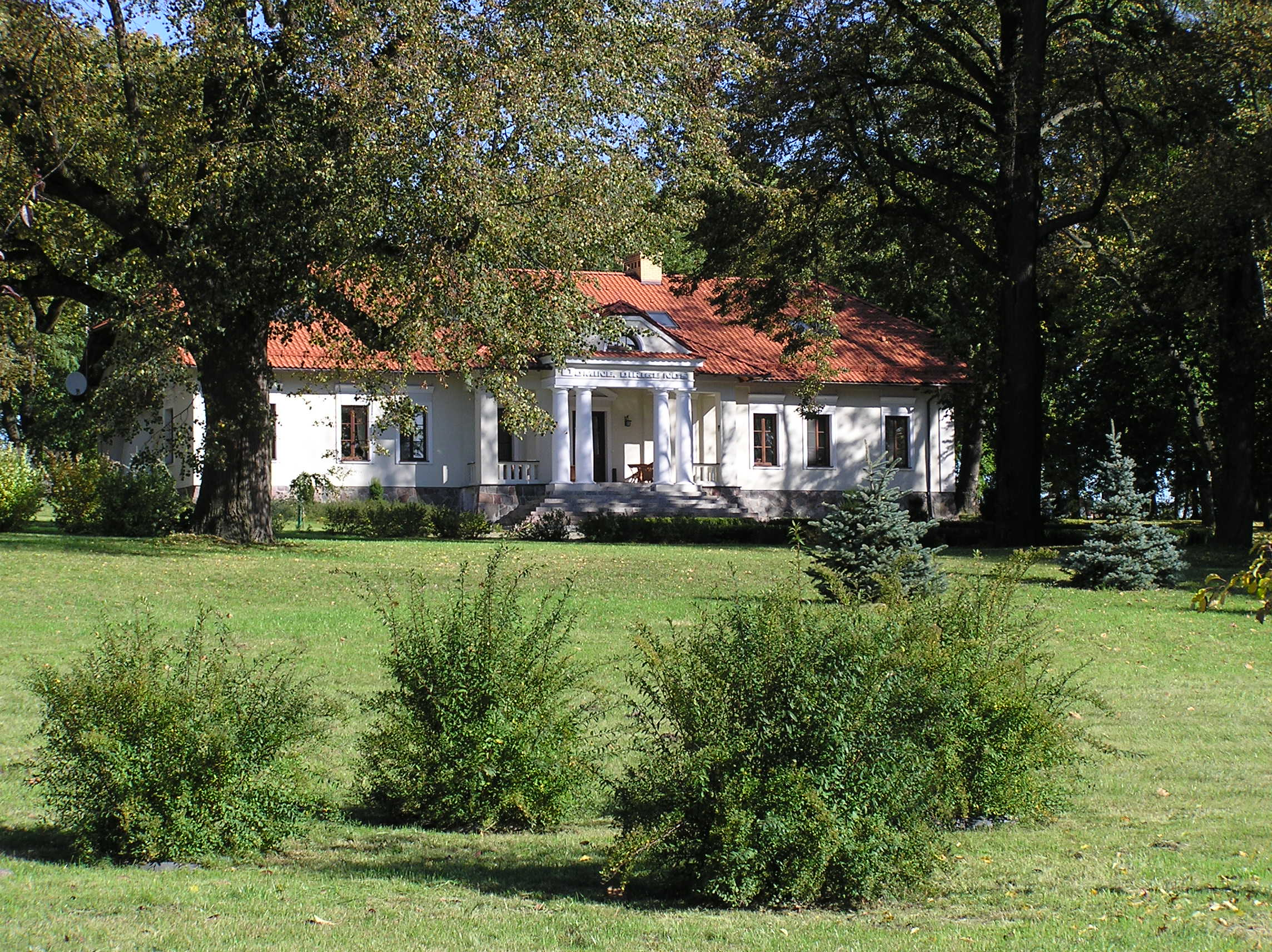
- Waliński family manor

- Location within Poland
- Coordinates: 51°3′30″N 19°49′53″E
- Country: Poland
- Voivodeship: Łódź
- County: Radomsko
- Gmina: Wielgomłyny

Sokola Góra [sɔˈkɔla ˈɡura] is a village in the administrative district of Gmina Wielgomłyny, within Radomsko County, Łódź Voivodeship, in central Poland.

== International relations ==
=== Twin towns — Sister cities ===
Sokola Góra is twinned with:

- Mysłowice, Poland
