= Stary Pawłów =

- Village
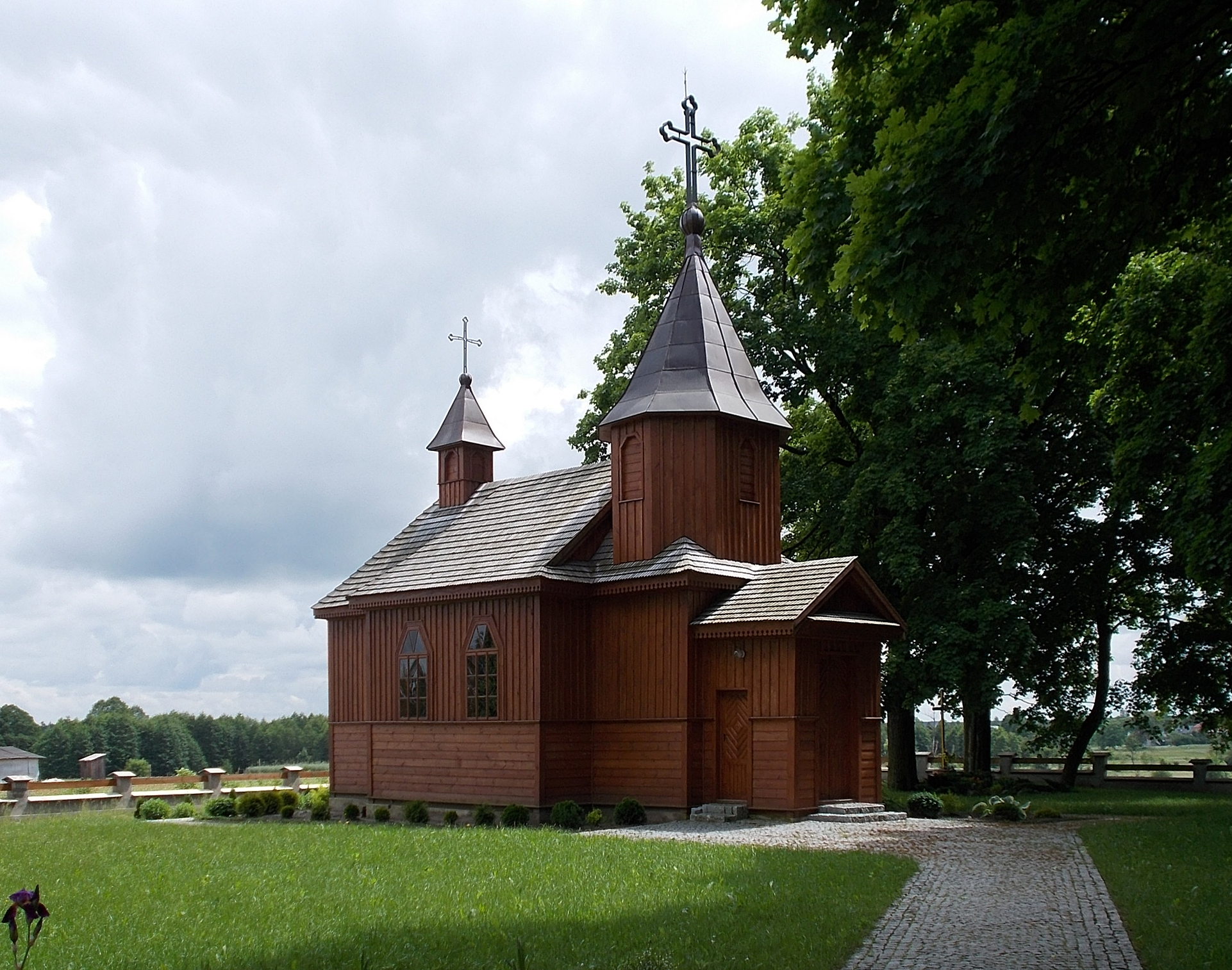
- Saint Nicholas church in Stary Pawłów

- Location within Poland
- Coordinates: 52°12′02″N 23°12′03″E
- Country: Poland
- Voivodeship: Lublin
- County: Biała
- Gmina: Janów Podlaski
- Time zone: UTC+1 (CET)
  - Summer (DST): UTC+2 (CEST)

Stary Pawłów [ˈstarɨ ˈpavwuf] is a village in the administrative district of Gmina Janów Podlaski, within Biała County, Lublin Voivodeship, in eastern Poland, close to the border with Belarus.

== History ==
Two Polish citizens were murdered by Nazi Germany in the village during World War II.
