= Borecznica =

- Village
- Location within Poland
- Coordinates: 51°1′47″N 19°44′53″E
- Country: Poland
- Voivodeship: Łódź
- County: Radomsko
- Gmina: Wielgomłyny

Borecznica [bɔrɛt͡ʂˈnit͡sa] is a village in the administrative district of Gmina Wielgomłyny, within Radomsko County, Łódź Voivodeship, in central Poland.
