= Rokitnica, Lubusz Voivodeship =

Rokitnica
- Village
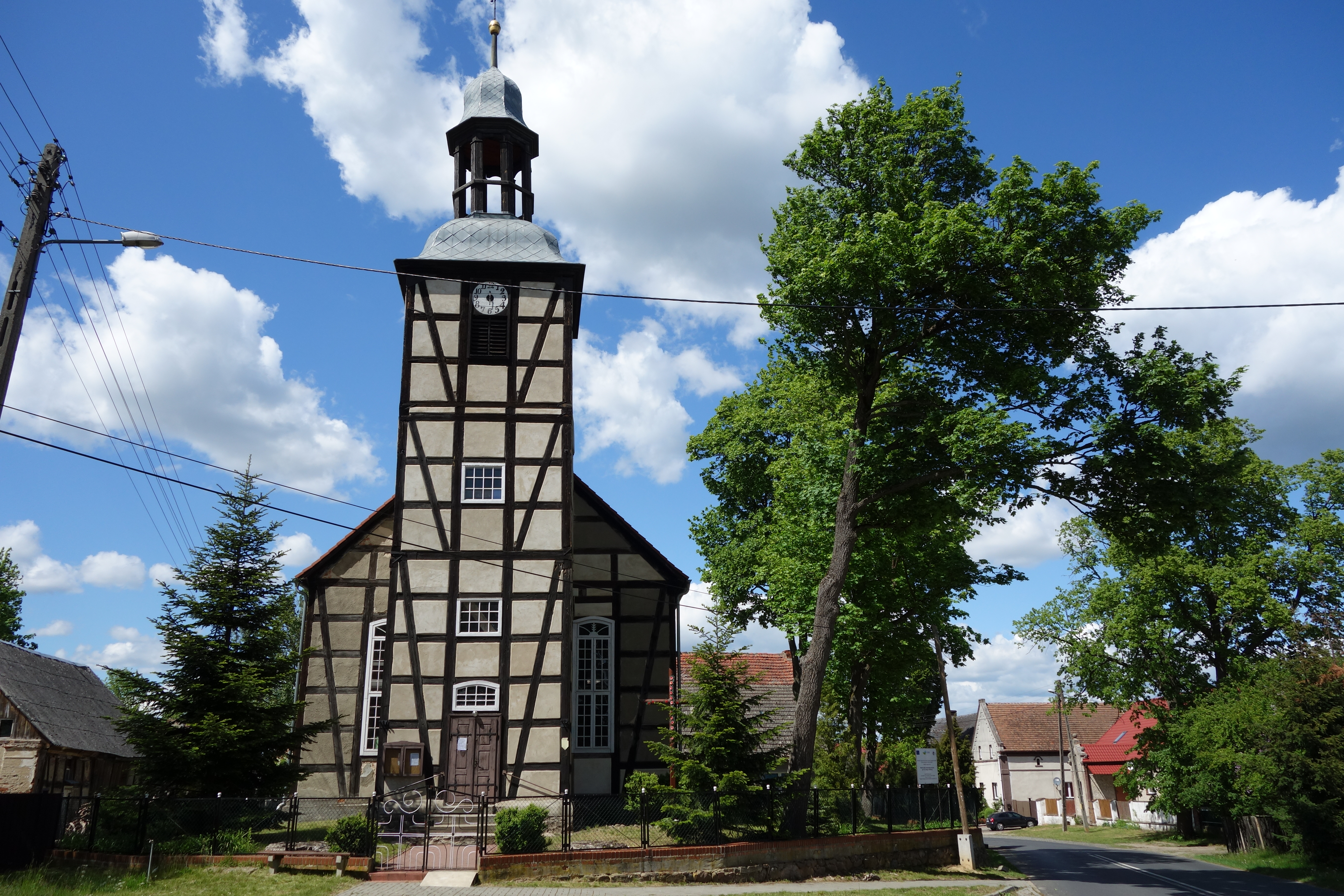
- Catholic church

- Location within Poland
- Coordinates: 52°11′7″N 15°23′19″E
- Country: Poland
- Voivodeship: Lubusz
- County: Świebodzin
- Gmina: Skąpe
- Population: 257

Rokitnica [rɔkitˈnit͡sa] is a village in the administrative district of Gmina Skąpe, within Świebodzin County, Lubusz Voivodeship, in western Poland.
