= Krzętów =

- Village
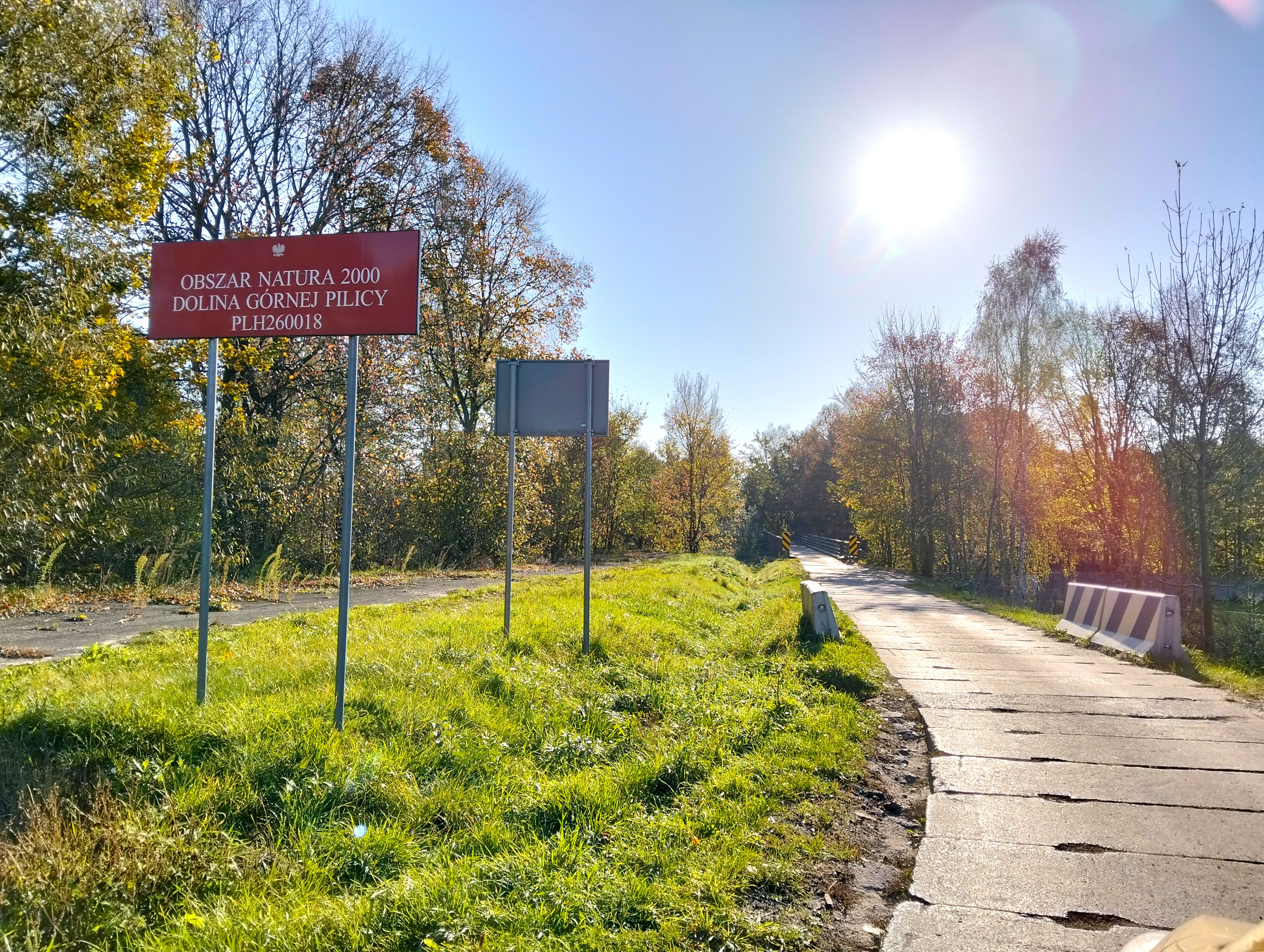

- Location within Poland
- Coordinates: 50°59′N 19°50′E
- Country: Poland
- Voivodeship: Łódź
- County: Radomsko
- Gmina: Wielgomłyny

Krzętów [ˈkʂɛntuf] is a village in the administrative district of Gmina Wielgomłyny, within Radomsko County, Łódź Voivodeship, in central Poland.
