= Wielgomłyny-Kolonia =

- Village
- Location within Poland
- Coordinates: 51°1′6″N 19°45′55″E
- Country: Poland
- Voivodeship: Łódź
- County: Radomsko
- Gmina: Wielgomłyny
- Website: https://www.wielgomlyny.eu

Wielgomłyny-Kolonia [vjɛlɡɔmˈwɨnɨ kɔˈlɔɲa] is a village in the administrative district of Gmina Wielgomłyny, within Radomsko County, Łódź Voivodeship, in central Poland.
