= Polinów, Lublin Voivodeship =

Polinów
- Village
- Location within Poland
- Coordinates: 52°9′N 23°10′E
- Country: Poland
- Voivodeship: Lublin
- County: Biała
- Gmina: Janów Podlaski

Population (approx.)
  - Total: 100

Polinów [pɔˈlʲinuf] is a village in the administrative district of Gmina Janów Podlaski, within Biała County, Lublin Voivodeship, in eastern Poland, close to the border with Belarus.
