= Anielin, Radomsko County =

Anielin
- Village
- Location within Poland
- Coordinates: 51°0′6″N 19°46′50″E
- Country: Poland
- Voivodeship: Łódź
- County: Radomsko
- Gmina: Wielgomłyny

Anielin [aˈɲɛlin] is a village in the administrative district of Gmina Wielgomłyny, within Radomsko County, Łódź Voivodeship, in central Poland.
