= Kajetanka =

- Village
- Location within Poland
- Coordinates: 52°10′31″N 23°16′38″E
- Country: Poland
- Voivodeship: Lublin
- County: Biała
- Gmina: Janów Podlaski

Population
  - Total: 8
- Time zone: UTC+1 (CET)
  - Summer (DST): UTC+2 (CEST)

Kajetanka [kajɛˈtaŋka] is a village in the administrative district of Gmina Janów Podlaski, within Biała County, Lublin Voivodeship, in eastern Poland, close to the border with Belarus.

== History ==
Six Polish citizens were murdered by Nazi Germany in the village during World War II.
