= Niesulice =

- Village
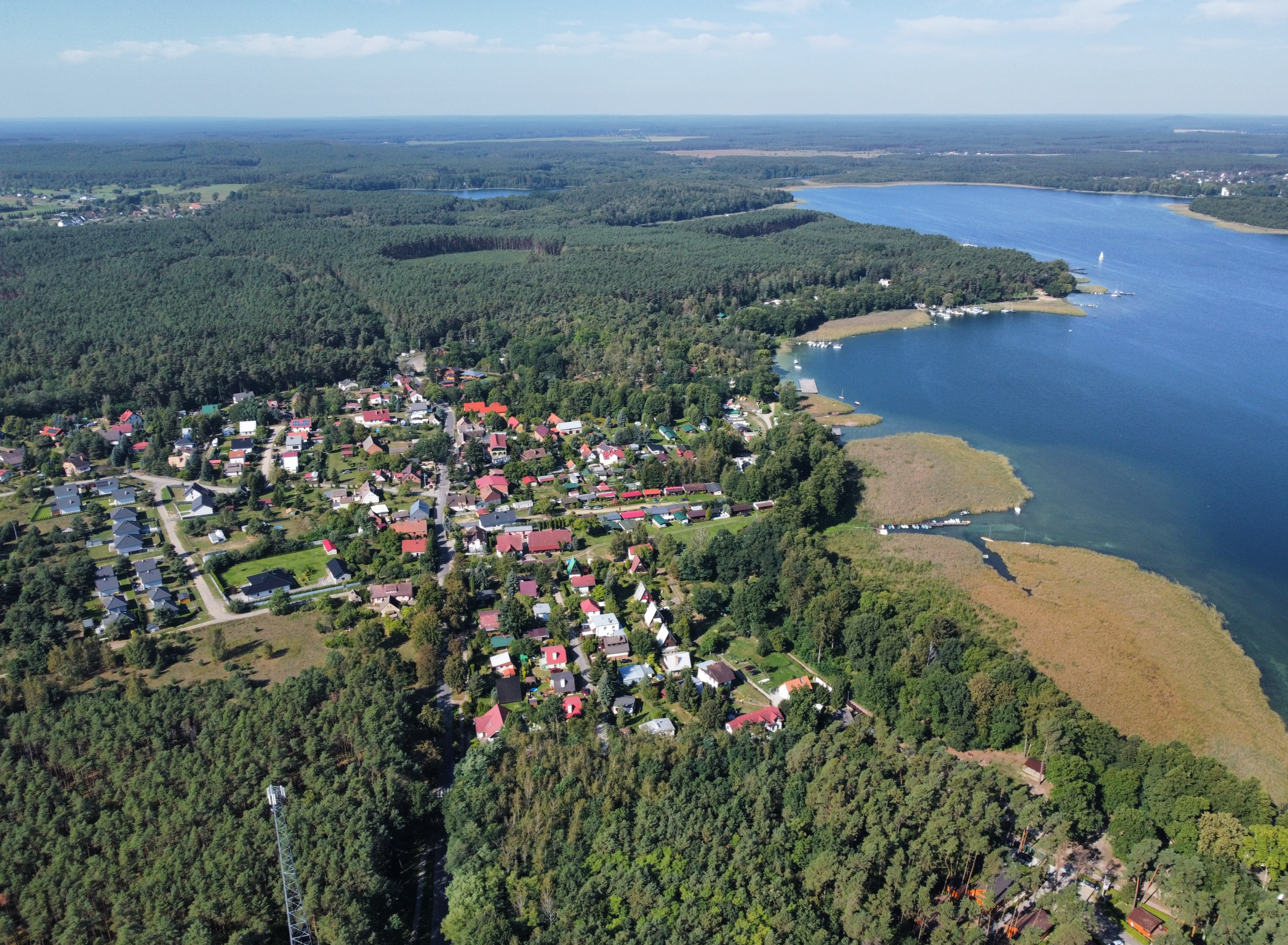

- Location within Poland
- Coordinates: 52°13′N 15°24′E
- Country: Poland
- Voivodeship: Lubusz
- County: Świebodzin
- Gmina: Skąpe
- Population: 105

Niesulice [ɲɛsuˈlit͡sɛ] is a village in the administrative district of Gmina Skąpe, within Świebodzin County, Lubusz Voivodeship, in western Poland.
