= Zagórze, Gmina Wielgomłyny =

Zagórze
- Village
- Location within Poland
- Coordinates: 51°2′39″N 19°44′14″E
- Country: Poland
- Voivodeship: Łódź
- County: Radomsko
- Gmina: Wielgomłyny

Zagórze [zaˈɡuʐɛ] is a village in the administrative district of Gmina Wielgomłyny, within Radomsko County, Łódź Voivodeship, in central Poland.
