= Nowy Pawłów =

- Village
- Location within Poland
- Coordinates: 52°13′N 23°10′E
- Country: Poland
- Voivodeship: Lublin
- County: Biała
- Gmina: Janów Podlaski

Population
  - Total: 420

Nowy Pawłów [ˈnɔvɨ ˈpavwuf] is a village in the administrative district of Gmina Janów Podlaski, within Biała County, Lublin Voivodeship, in eastern Poland, close to the border with Belarus.
