= Romanów, Gmina Janów Podlaski =

Romanów
- Village
- Location within Poland
- Coordinates: 52°11′11″N 23°9′38″E
- Country: Poland
- Voivodeship: Lublin
- County: Biała
- Gmina: Janów Podlaski

Romanów [rɔˈmanuf] is a village in the administrative district of Gmina Janów Podlaski, within Biała County, Lublin Voivodeship, in eastern Poland, close to the border with Belarus.
