= Myśliwczów-Kolonia =

- Village
- Location within Poland
- Coordinates: 50°58′46″N 19°45′10″E
- Country: Poland
- Voivodeship: Łódź
- County: Radomsko
- Gmina: Wielgomłyny

Myśliwczów-Kolonia [mɨˈɕlift͡ʂuf kɔˈlɔɲa] is a village in the administrative district of Gmina Wielgomłyny, within Radomsko County, Łódź Voivodeship, in central Poland.
