= Bogusławów =

- Village
- Location within Poland
- Coordinates: 50°59′N 19°43′E
- Country: Poland
- Voivodeship: Łódź
- County: Radomsko
- Gmina: Wielgomłyny
- Population: 2

Bogusławów [bɔɡuˈswavuf] is a village in the administrative district of Gmina Wielgomłyny, within Radomsko County, Łódź Voivodeship, in central Poland.
