= Wólka Włościańska =

- Village
- Location within Poland
- Coordinates: 51°3′1″N 19°43′5″E
- Country: Poland
- Voivodeship: Łódź
- County: Radomsko
- Gmina: Wielgomłyny

Wólka Włościańska (Polish pronunciation: [ˈvulka vwɔɕˈtɕaj̃ska]) is a village in the administrative district of Gmina Wielgomłyny, within Radomsko County, Łódź Voivodeship, in central Poland.
