= Myśliwczów =

- Village
- Location within Poland
- Coordinates: 50°59′38″N 19°45′12″E
- Country: Poland
- Voivodeship: Łódź
- County: Radomsko
- Gmina: Wielgomłyny

Myśliwczów [mɨˈɕlift͡ʂuf] is a village in the administrative district of Gmina Wielgomłyny, within Radomsko County, Łódź Voivodeship, in central Poland.
