= Niedośpielin =

- Village
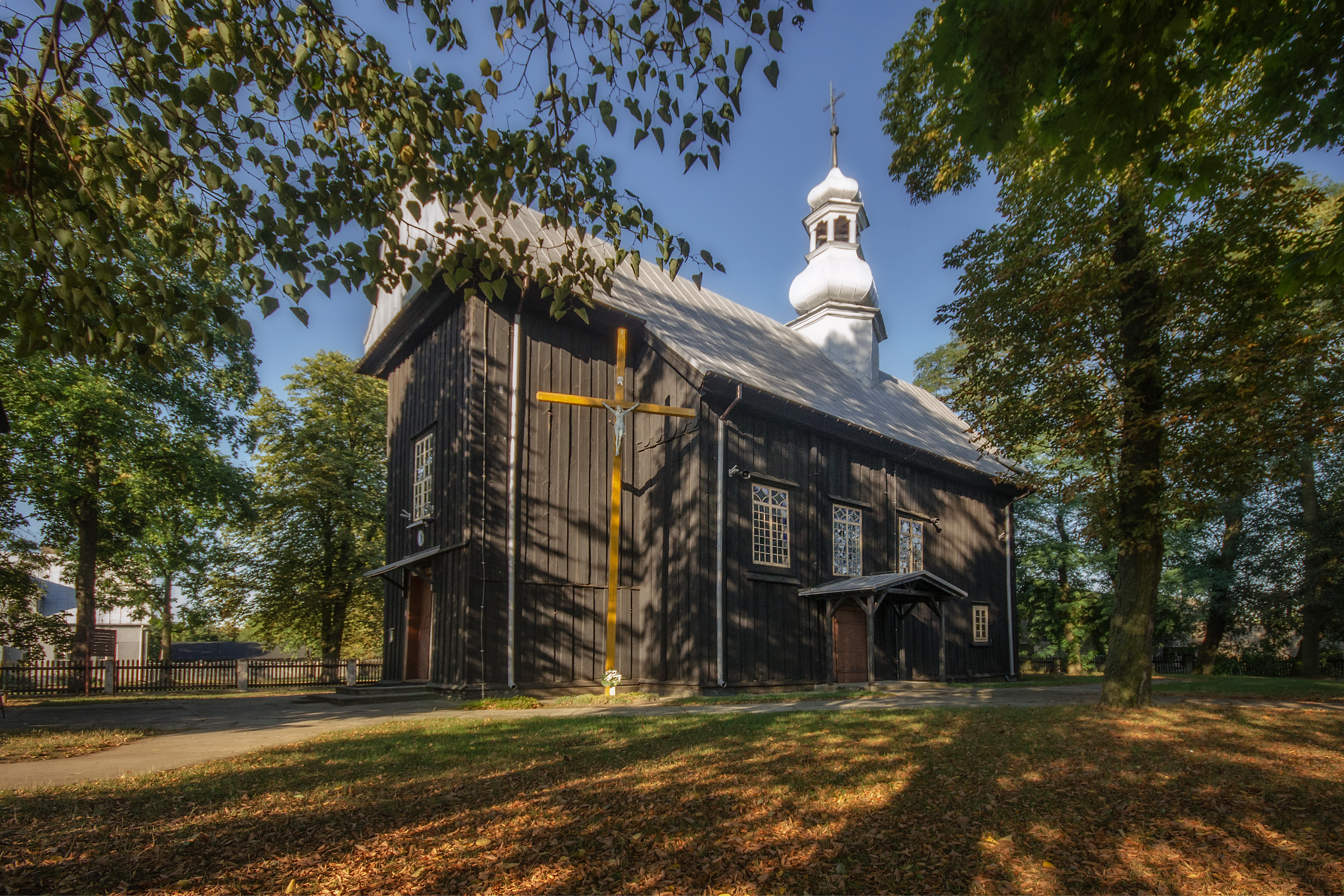
- Catholic church

- Location within Poland
- Coordinates: 51°1′0″N 19°43′44″E
- Country: Poland
- Voivodeship: Łódź
- County: Radomsko
- Gmina: Wielgomłyny
- Population (approx.): 650

Niedośpielin [ɲɛdɔɕˈpjɛlin] is a village in the administrative district of Gmina Wielgomłyny, within Radomsko County, Łódź Voivodeship, in central Poland.

The village has an approximate population of 650.
