= Radoszyn =

- Village
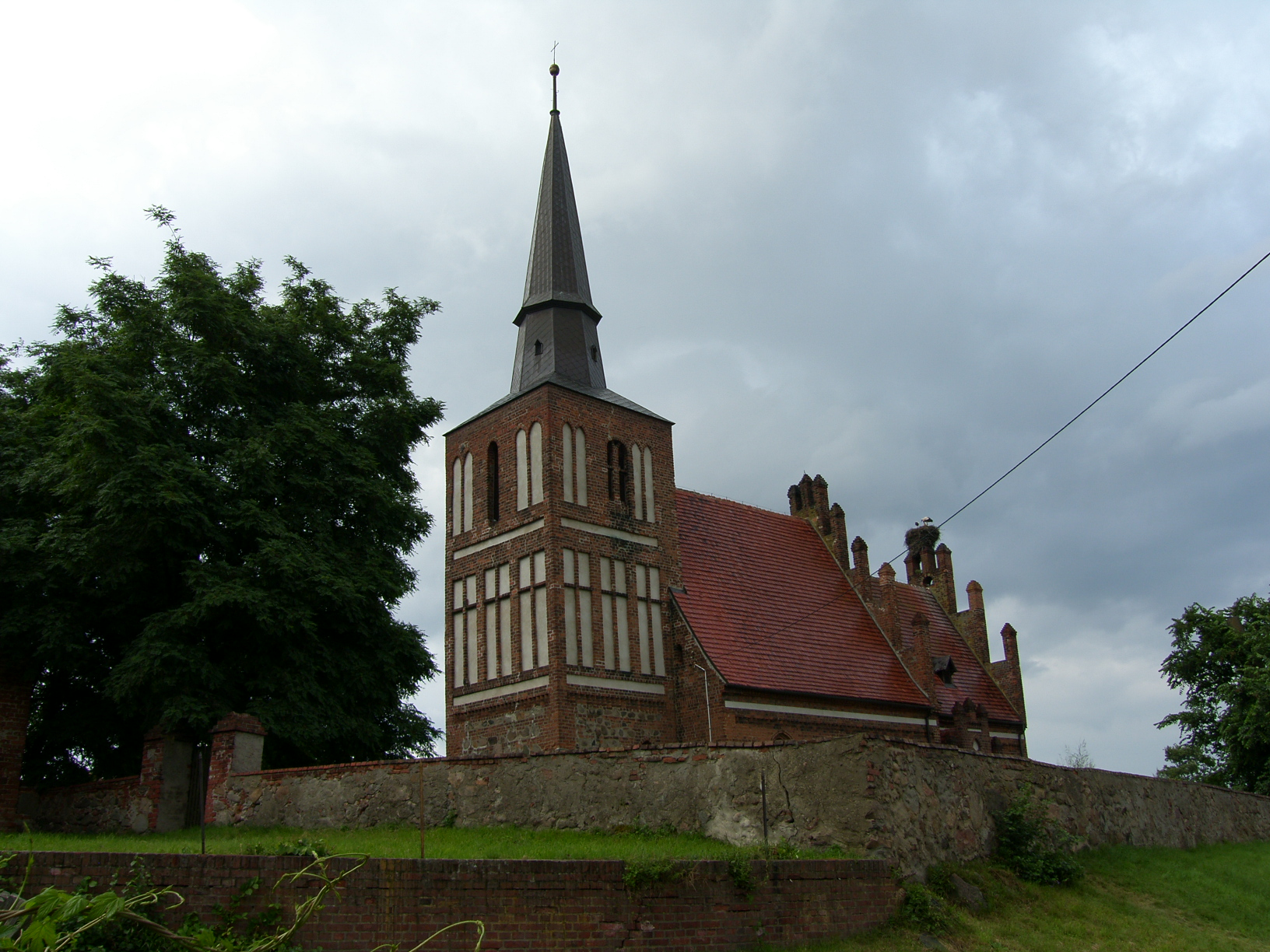
- Catholic church

- Location within Poland
- Coordinates: 52°11′N 15°30′E
- Country: Poland
- Voivodeship: Lubusz
- County: Świebodzin
- Gmina: Skąpe
- Population: 584

Radoszyn [raˈdɔʂɨn] is a village in the administrative district of Gmina Skąpe, within Świebodzin County, Lubusz Voivodeship, in western Poland.
