= Złoty Potok, Lubusz Voivodeship =

Złoty Potok
- Village
- Location within Poland
- Coordinates: 52°12′58″N 15°22′00″E
- Country: Poland
- Voivodeship: Lubusz
- County: Świebodzin
- Gmina: Skąpe

Złoty Potok (Polish pronunciation: ['zwɔtɨ ˈpɔtɔk]) is a village in the administrative district of Gmina Skąpe, within Świebodzin County, Lubusz Voivodeship, in western Poland.
