= Stare Buczyce =

- Village
- Location within Poland
- Coordinates: 52°13′22″N 23°11′24″E
- Country: Poland
- Voivodeship: Lublin
- County: Biała
- Gmina: Janów Podlaski

Stare Buczyce [ˈstarɛ buˈt͡ʂɨt͡sɛ] is a village in the administrative district of Gmina Janów Podlaski, within Biała County, Lublin Voivodeship, in eastern Poland, close to the border with Belarus.
