= Wielgomłyny =

- Village
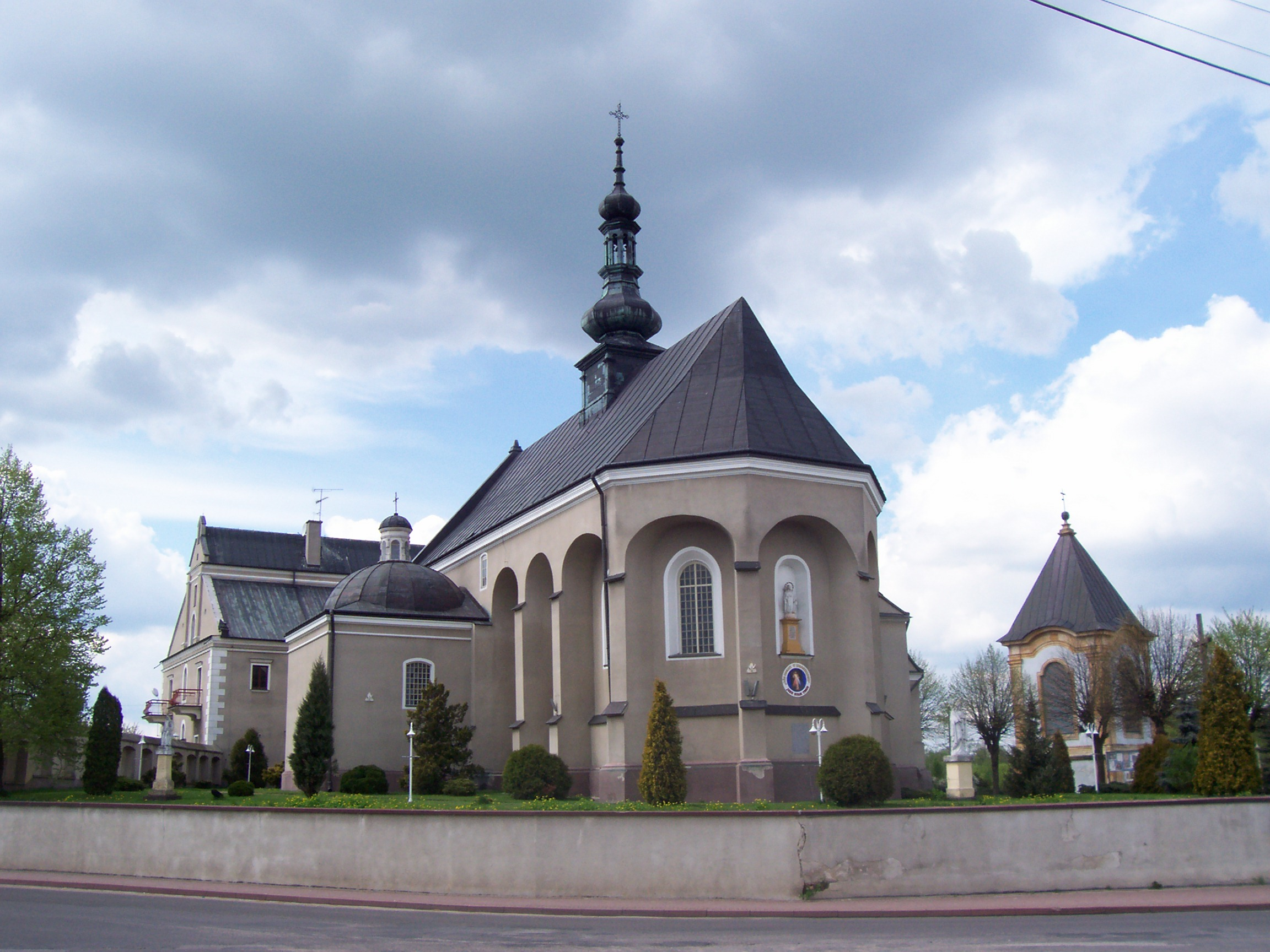
- Saint Stanislaus Church

- Coat of arms

- Location within Poland
- Coordinates: 51°0′45″N 19°45′48″E
- Country: Poland
- Voivodeship: Łódź
- County: Radomsko
- Gmina: Wielgomłyny
- Population: 870

Wielgomłyny [vjɛlɡɔmˈwɨnɨ] is a village in Radomsko County, Łódź Voivodeship, in central Poland. It is the seat of the gmina (administrative district) called Gmina Wielgomłyny.
