= Gmina Wielgomłyny =

Gmina Wielgomłyny Wielgomłyny Commune
- Gmina
- Coat of arms
- Interactive map of Gmina Wielgomłyny
- Coordinates (Wielgomłyny): 51°0′45″N 19°45′48″E
- Country: Poland
- Voivodeship: Łódź
- County: Radomsko
- Seat: Wielgomłyny

Area
  - Total: 123.07 km^{2} (47.52 sq mi)

Population (2006)
  - Total: 4,951
  - Density: 40.23/km^{2} (104.2/sq mi)
- Website: http://www.wielgomlyny.pl

Gmina Wielgomłyny is a rural gmina (administrative district) in Radomsko County, Łódź Voivodeship, in central Poland. Its seat is the village of Wielgomłyny, which lies approximately 23 kilometres (14 mi) east of Radomsko and 88 km (55 mi) south of the regional capital Łódź.

The gmina covers an area of 123.07 square kilometres (47.5 sq mi), and as of 2006 its total population is 4,951.

The gmina contains part of the protected area called Przedbórz Landscape Park.

== Villages ==
Gmina Wielgomłyny contains the villages and settlements of Anielin, Błonie, Bogusławów, Borecznica, Borowiec, Dębowiec, Goszczowa, Grabowie, Karczów, Kruszyna, Krzętów, Kubiki, Maksymów, Myśliwczów, Myśliwczów-Kolonia, Niedośpielin, Niwa Goszczowska, Niwa Zagórska, Odrowąż, Popielarnia, Pratkowice, Rogi, Rudka, Sokola Góra, Sroków, Trzebce, Trzebce-Perzyny, Wielgomłyny, Wielgomłyny-Kolonia, Wola Kuźniewska, Wola Życińska, Wólka Bankowa, Wólka Włościańska, Zacisze, Zagórze, Zalesie and Zawodzie.

== Neighbouring gminas ==
Gmina Wielgomłyny is bordered by the gminas of Kluczewsko, Kobiele Wielkie, Masłowice, Przedbórz and Żytno.
