= Wola Kuźniewska =

- Village
- Location within Poland
- Coordinates: 51°0′N 19°43′E
- Country: Poland
- Voivodeship: Łódź
- County: Radomsko
- Gmina: Wielgomłyny

Wola Kuźniewska [ˈvɔla kuʑˈɲɛfska] is a village in the administrative district of Gmina Wielgomłyny, within Radomsko County, Łódź Voivodeship, in central Poland.
