= Borowiec, Radomsko County =

Borowiec
- Village
- Location within Poland
- Coordinates: 51°0′33″N 19°48′11″E
- Country: Poland
- Voivodeship: Łódź
- County: Radomsko
- Gmina: Wielgomłyny

Borowiec [bɔˈrɔvjɛt͡s] is a village in the administrative district of Gmina Wielgomłyny, within Radomsko County, Łódź Voivodeship, in central Poland.
