= Sroków =

- Village
- Location within Poland
- Coordinates: 51°2′21″N 19°46′10″E
- Country: Poland
- Voivodeship: Łódź
- County: Radomsko
- Gmina: Wielgomłyny

Sroków [ˈsrɔkuf] is a village in the administrative district of Gmina Wielgomłyny, within Radomsko County, Łódź Voivodeship, in central Poland.
