= Zalesie, Gmina Wielgomłyny =

Zalesie
- Village
- Location within Poland
- Coordinates: 51°1′56″N 19°46′11″E
- Country: Poland
- Voivodeship: Łódź
- County: Radomsko
- Gmina: Wielgomłyny

Zalesie [zaˈlɛɕɛ] is a village in the administrative district of Gmina Wielgomłyny, within Radomsko County, Łódź Voivodeship, in central Poland.
