= Międzylesie, Świebodzin County =

Międzylesie
- Village
- Location within Poland
- Coordinates: 52°8′N 15°22′E
- Country: Poland
- Voivodeship: Lubusz
- County: Świebodzin
- Gmina: Skąpe
- Population: 189

Międzylesie [mjɛnd͡zɨˈlɛɕɛ] is a village in the administrative district of Gmina Skąpe, within Świebodzin County, Lubusz Voivodeship, in western Poland.
