= Biberstein coat of arms =

Polish coat of arms

Biberstein
- Alternative names: Bibersztein, Bibersztajn, Bibersztyn, Bieberstein, Momot
- Earliest mention: 1094
- Families: Bałkowski, Białkowski, Bibestein, Bibersztein, Błoński, Boczowski, Boiszewski, Boiszowski, Borus, Gniazdowski, Górski, Hirtemberg, Jazwiecki, Jaźwiecki, Kacimierski, Kazimierski, Kazimirski, Kielnerski, Kolanowski, Maciejowicz, Mikołajowski, Mokranowski, Momot, Momoth, Nemitz, Odroclew, Odrwolff, Pierożek, Podłęski, Poręnby, Przybysławski, Radziejowski, Ridolewski, Rupnowski, Rydalski, Rydolewski, Sebieński, Seboński, Skotnicki, Starowiejski, Starowieyski, Staszkowski, Szebieński, Tarnowski, Tur, Wołowicz, Zakrzewski

Biberstein is a Polish coat of arms. It was used by several szlachta families in the times of the Kingdom of Poland and the Polish–Lithuanian Commonwealth.

== Blazon ==
Or, a stag's attire gules.

== Notable bearers ==
Notable bearers of this coat of arms include:

- Stanisław Kostka Starowieyski (1895-1941) a reserve artillery captain of the Polish Armed Forces, a participant (1918-1920) to the Polish-Ukrainian War and the Polish-Soviet War, a church, social and charity activist and a papal chamberlain. He died at the concentration camp in Dachau concentration camp and was beatified in 1999.

== Gallery ==
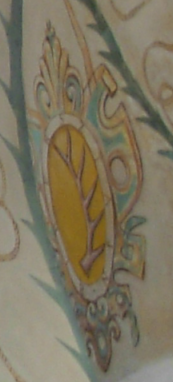
Biberstein coat of arms in Baranów Sandomierki castle

== See also ==
- Bieberstein
- Polish heraldry
- Heraldic family
- List of Polish nobility coats of arms

== Bibliography ==
- Bobrowicz, Jan Nepomucen "Herbarz polski Kaspra Niesieckiego S.J. powiększony dodatkami z późniejszych autorów, rękopisów, dowodów urzędowych", Tom I, Lipsk 1839–1846
- Ulanowski B. Inscriptiones clenodiales ex libris iudicialibus palatinatus Cracoviensis, "Starodawne prawa polskiego pomniki", Kraków 1885
- Piekosiński Franciszek "Heraldyka polska wieków średnich", Kraków 1899
- Białkowski Leon "Ród Bibersteinów a ród Momotów godła jeleniego Rogu w wiekach XIV-XVI" Lublin 1948
