= Stary Bubel =

- Village
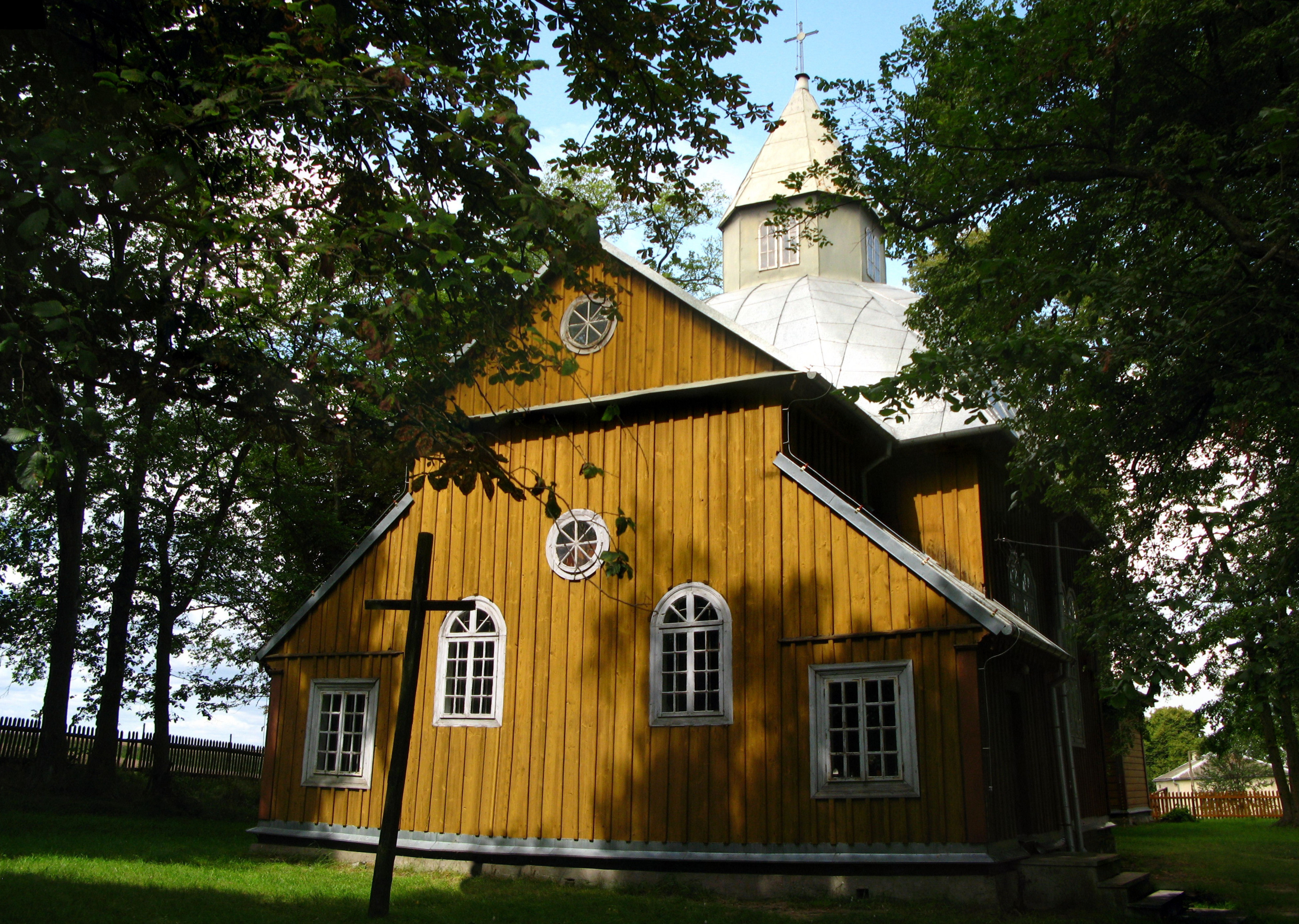
- Church of Saint John the Evangelist

- Location within Poland
- Coordinates: 52°15′37″N 23°10′48″E
- Country: Poland
- Voivodeship: Lublin
- County: Biała
- Gmina: Janów Podlaski

Stary Bubel [ˈstarɨ ˈbubɛl] is a village in the administrative district of Gmina Janów Podlaski, within Biała County, Lublin Voivodeship, in eastern Poland, close to the border with Belarus.
