= Blonsky =

Blonsky is an East Slavic language surname. Feminine forms: Blonska (Блонська, Ukrainian), Blonskaya (Блонская, Russian, Belarusian). The surnames Blonsky, Oblonsky, Obolonsky may be derived from various placenames Блонь, Облонь, Оболонь. According to Vladimir Dal's Explanatory Dictionary, the terms блонье, oболонье, among other meanings, referred to a kind of wet meadow by river (in Western parts of the Russian Empire), as well as the surrounds of a town, a suburb; - all originating from the generic meaning of "surrounding"., and it is suggested that the term gave rise to placenames. "Blonsky" may also be the Russified form of the Polish surname Błoński of similar origin.

Notable people with the surname include:

- Lyudmyla Blonska, Ukrainian athlete
- Nikki Blonsky (born 1988), American actress and singer
- Pavel Petrovich Blonsky (1884–1941), Soviet psychologist
- Seraphima Blonskaya (1870–1947), Russian artist and art teacher.

Fictional characters

- Emil Blonsky (a.k.a. The Abomination), a supervillain from Marvel Comics
