= Przetocznica =

- Village
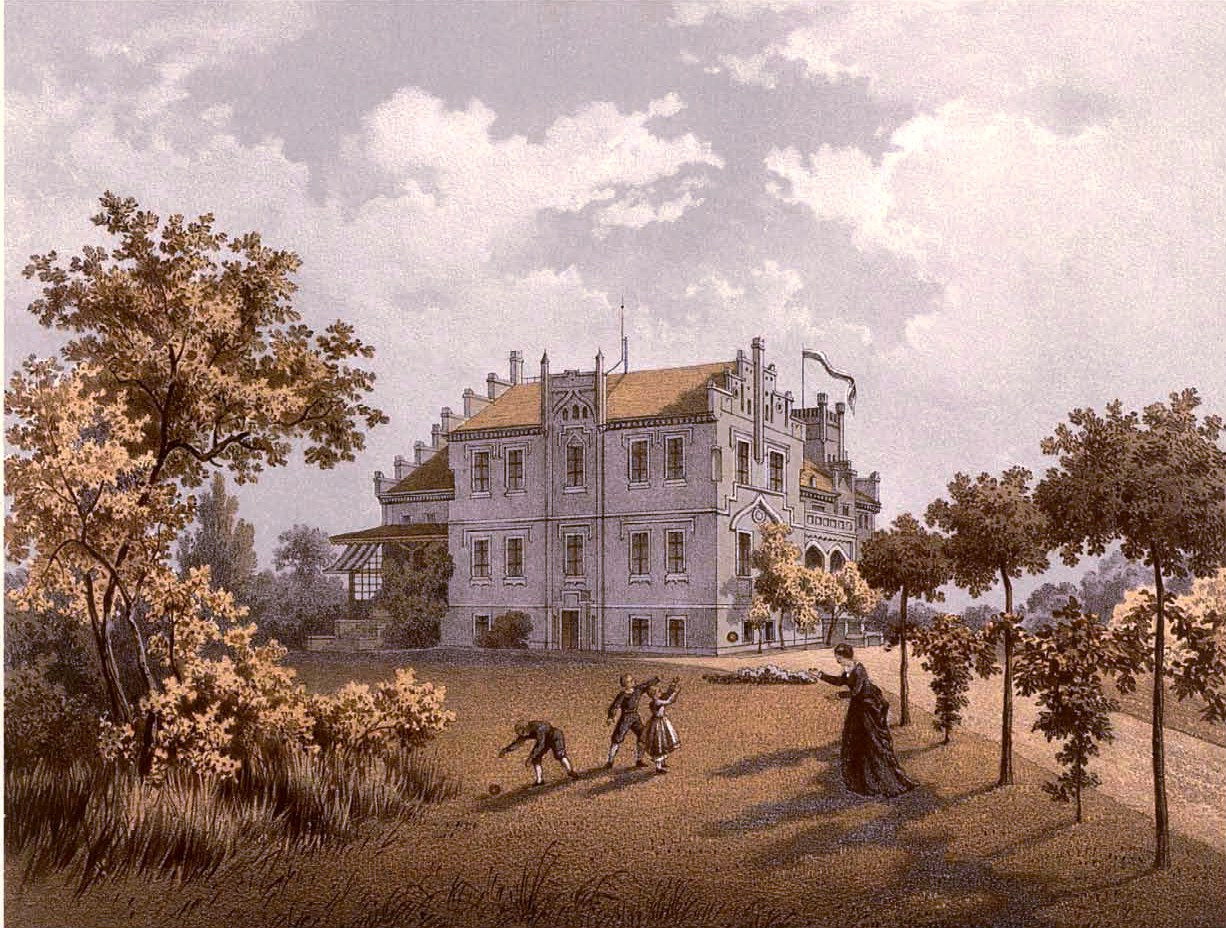
- Alexander Duncker (1813-1897): Hammer Manor

- Location within Poland
- Coordinates: 52°7′N 15°24′E
- Country: Poland
- Voivodeship: Lubusz
- County: Świebodzin
- Gmina: Skąpe
- Population: 41

Przetocznica [pʂɛtɔt͡ʂˈnit͡sa] is a village in the administrative district of Gmina Skąpe, within Świebodzin County, Lubusz Voivodeship, in western Poland.

== Notable people ==
- Anna Louisa Karsch (1722–1791), poet
