= Cibórz, Lubusz Voivodeship =

Cibórz
- Settlement
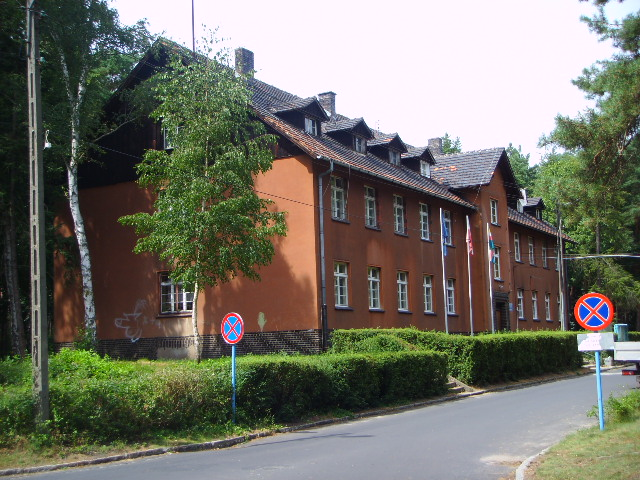
- Psychiatric hospital in Cibórz

- Location within Poland
- Coordinates: 52°8′N 15°24′E
- Country: Poland
- Voivodeship: Lubusz
- County: Świebodzin
- Gmina: Skąpe

Population
  - Total: 968
- Time zone: UTC+1 (CET)
  - Summer (DST): UTC+2 (CEST)
- Vehicle registration: FSW

Cibórz [ˈt͡ɕibuʂ] is a settlement in the administrative district of Gmina Skąpe, within Świebodzin County, Lubusz Voivodeship, in western Poland. It is situated on the shore of Lake Ciborze.

Cibórz is the location of the largest psychiatric hospital in the Lubusz Voivodeship.

During World War II, the Germans operated the Oflag III-B prisoner-of-war camp for Belgian officers in the settlement.
