= Popielarnia, Łódź Voivodeship =

Popielarnia
- Village
- Location within Poland
- Coordinates: 51°00′08″N 19°42′05″E
- Country: Poland
- Voivodeship: Łódź
- County: Radomsko
- Gmina: Wielgomłyny

Popielarnia [pɔpjɛˈlarɲa] is a village in the administrative district of Gmina Wielgomłyny, within Radomsko County, Łódź Voivodeship, in central Poland.
