= Błonie, Radomsko County =

Błonie
- Village
- Location within Poland
- Coordinates: 50°57′N 19°49′E
- Country: Poland
- Voivodeship: Łódź
- County: Radomsko
- Gmina: Wielgomłyny

Błonie [ˈbwɔɲɛ] is a village in the administrative district of Gmina Wielgomłyny, within Radomsko County, Łódź Voivodeship, in central Poland.
