= Rogi, Łódź Voivodeship =

Rogi
- Village
- Location within Poland
- Coordinates: 50°58′52″N 19°47′21″E
- Country: Poland
- Voivodeship: Łódź
- County: Radomsko
- Gmina: Wielgomłyny

Rogi [ˈrɔɡi] is a village in the administrative district of Gmina Wielgomłyny, within Radomsko County, Łódź Voivodeship, in central Poland.
