= Kruszyna, Łódź Voivodeship =

Kruszyna
- Village
- Location within Poland
- Coordinates: 51°1′32″N 19°48′3″E
- Country: Poland
- Voivodeship: Łódź
- County: Radomsko
- Gmina: Wielgomłyny

Kruszyna [kruˈʂɨna] is a village in the administrative district of Gmina Wielgomłyny, within Radomsko County, Łódź Voivodeship, in central Poland.
