= Błonie, Lubusz Voivodeship =

Błonie
- Village
- Location within Poland
- Coordinates: 52°12′N 15°20′E
- Country: Poland
- Voivodeship: Lubusz
- County: Świebodzin
- Gmina: Skąpe
- Population: 79

Błonie [ˈbwɔɲɛ] is a village in the administrative district of Gmina Skąpe, within Świebodzin County, Lubusz Voivodeship, in western Poland.
