= Lesesucht =

Die Lesewut (German for the reading craze) or Die Lesesucht (reading mania), are terms that describe a period in German history beginning in the eighteenth century. Goethe's The Sorrows of Young Werther and the Sturm und Drang movement are considered to have been the catalyst for this event.
