= Mirosław Obłoński =

Polish singer, writer and artist (1938–2023)

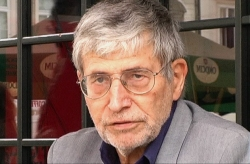

Mirosław Obłoński (17 July 1938 – 23 October 2023) was a Polish writer, poet, singer, and artist associated with the Piwnica pod Baranami cabaret.

== Life and career ==
Obłoński graduated from the Jagiellonian University in Kraków with a degree in history. In the early 1960s, he performed with the "Piwnica Pod Baranami" ("The basement under the Rams") group and in 1964 at the Opole Music Festival received the top award. In 1965 he received the award again, together with Ewa Sadowska. During this time he often performed with Ewa Demarczyk. Since 1973, he worked for TV Kraków.

While he retired in 2003, he continued to occasionally perform with the new version of the "Piwnica" cabaret.

Obłoński died on 23 October 2023, at the age of 85.
