= Siedlce Ghetto =

World War II Jewish ghetto

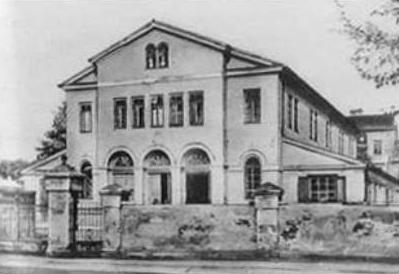
- Siedlce Synagogue burned down by the SS in 1939 in the lead up to the Holocaust in occupied Poland

- Siedlce location south of Treblinka in World War II
- Also known as: Siedlce Ghetto
- Location: Siedlce, German-occupied Poland
- Date: June 1941 – November 1942
- Incident type: Imprisonment, starvation, mass shootings, mass deportations
- Organizations: Nazi SS
- Victims: 12,000–17,000 Polish Jews; an unknown number of Roma people
- Memorials: The Jewish cemetery in Siedlce

The Siedlce Ghetto (Polish: Getto w Siedlcach), was a World War II Jewish ghetto set up by Nazi Germany in the city of Siedlce in occupied Poland, 92 kilometres (57 mi) east of Warsaw. (Note: Google Maps, Warsaw–Siedlce: 92.4 km via DK2 E30, 1 h 19 min without traffic. Previously: 113 km via DW803.) The ghetto was closed from the outside in early October 1941. Some 12,000 Polish Jews were imprisoned there for the purpose of persecution and exploitation. Conditions were appalling; epidemics of typhus and scarlet fever raged. Beginning on 22 August 1942, during the most deadly phase of the Holocaust in occupied Poland, around 10,000 Jews were rounded up – men, women and children – gathered at the Umschlagplatz, (Note: Map of the Siedlce Ghetto before and after August 1942 deportations with location of Umschlagplatz. Source: DeathCamps.org.) and deported to Treblinka extermination camp aboard Holocaust trains. Thousands of Jews were brought in from the ghettos in other cities and towns. In total, at least 17,000 Jews were annihilated in the process of ghetto liquidation. Hundreds of Jews were shot on the spot during the house-to-house searches, along with staff and patients of the Jewish hospital.

Over 1,500 persons were temporarily spared death in order to continue supplying slave labour for the five camps set up locally. They were deported to Treblinka from the so-called "little ghetto" before the end of 1942. Only a few hundred Jews survived in hiding until the German withdrawal from Siedlce.

== History ==
Prior to the invasion of Poland, Jews constituted around 50 percent of the town's population of 30,000 inhabitants. Jewish life in Siedlce experienced a revival in the interwar period. Many Jewish organizations sprung up, as well as printing presses, book stores and commercial establishments; there were several dozen Jewish bakeries, mills, metal shops, and jewelries. Almost all commerce was in the Jewish hands, sparking occasional labour disputes.

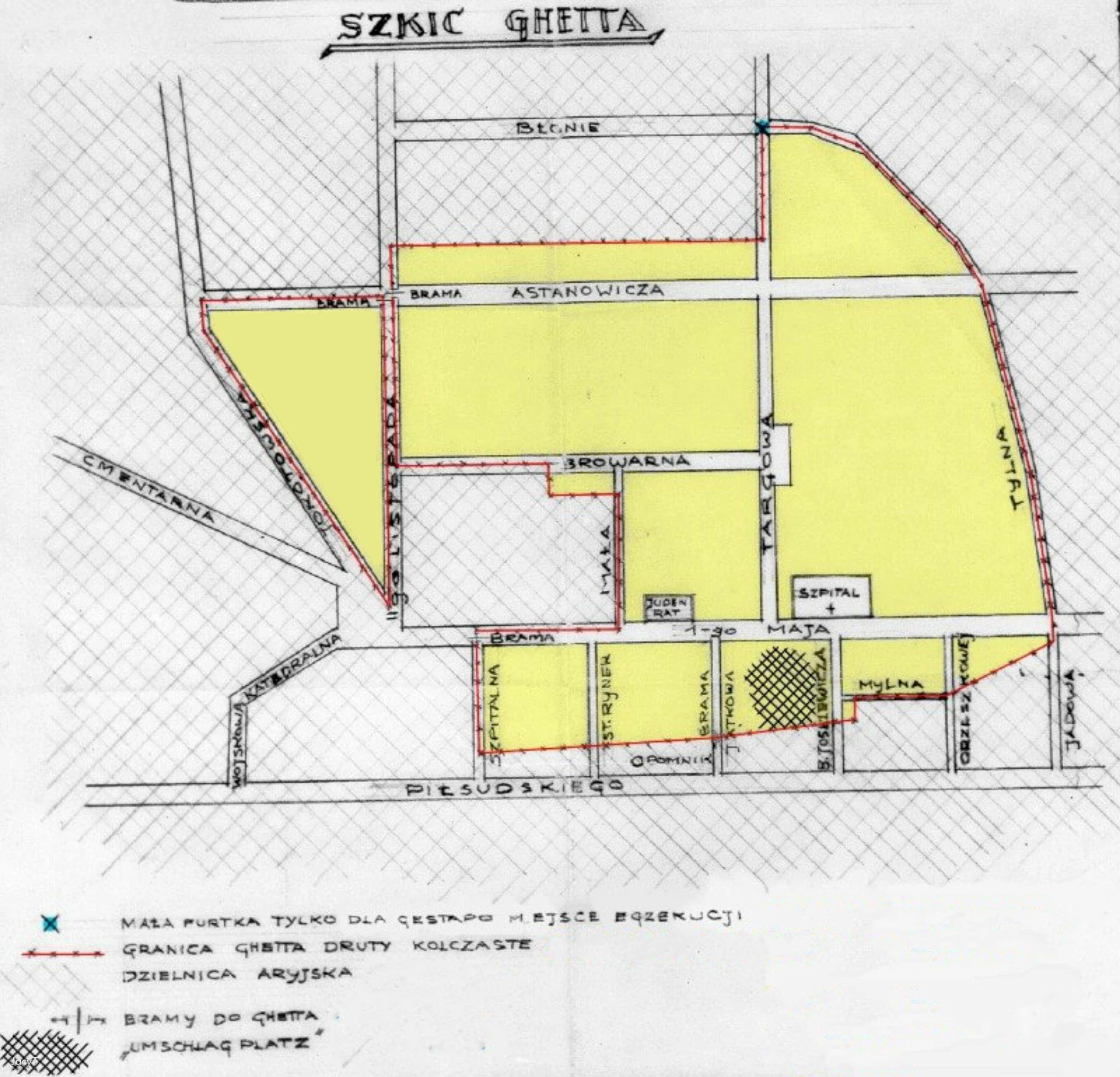

Map of Siedlce Ghetto, 1941

During the invasion of Poland, the German Panzer Division Kempf rolled into Siedlce on 12 September 1939 after a fierce battle along the Bug River with the Polish Modlin Army which surrendered soon afterwards. Siedlce was strafed and bombed several times by the Luftwaffe. In October, the persecution of Jews by the new German administration began with the arrest of 50 most prominent individuals. The creation of the Jewish Judenrat Council was ordered at the end of November. Among its 25 members were Icchak (Itzak) Nachum Weintraub (chairman; former head of the Jewish hospital), Hersz Eisenberg (vice-chairman), and Hersz Tenenbaum (secretary, liaison with the Gestapo). On Christmas Eve the Nazis set fire to the synagogue and burned it to the ground, notably with Jewish refugees inside.

Over a thousand Jews expelled from Kalisz were deported to Siedlce in 1940, with their compatriots from Łódź and Pabianice annexed to Warthegau. In order to strike terror in overcrowded neighbourhoods, the German police organized a 3-day shooting action in March 1941. The formal creation of a ghetto in Siedlce was pronounced on 2 August 1941. The smaller number of non-Jewish Poles living in designated areas were ordered to move out before 8:00 p.m. on 6 August. The Jewish families (over half of the city's population) were given two weeks to relocate there, along with Roma people. The ghetto zone consisted of several small city blocks and over a dozen walkable streets in city centre north of the Old Square. The ghetto was closed off by a barbed wire fence, and cut off from the outside world on 1 October 1941 with only three gates leading out, guarded by Nazi patrols.

=== Life in the Ghetto ===
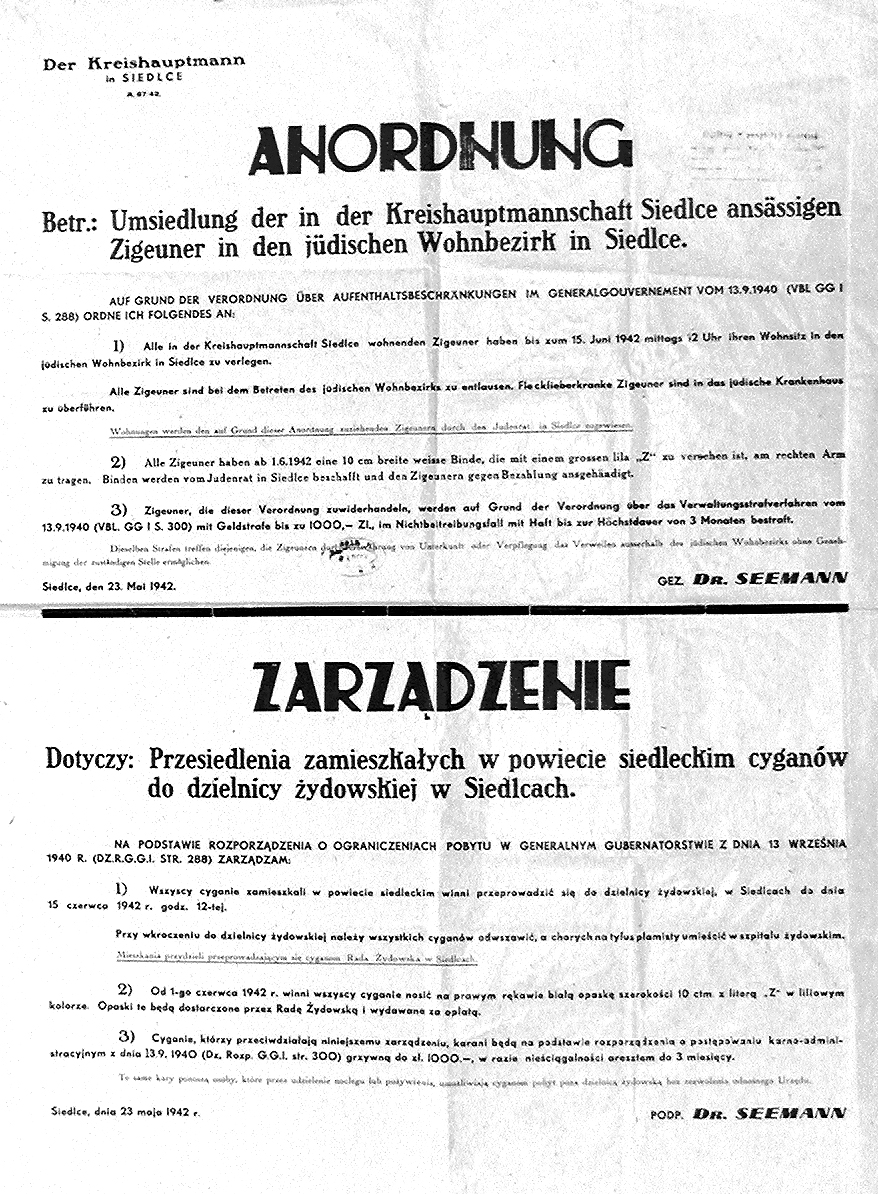
Public announcement by the Nazi occupation authority commanding the resettlement of all Roma people from the county of Siedlce into the Jewish ghetto, with the letter "Z" for Zigeuner (Gypsy in German) on their armbands.

Conditions in the ghetto were appalling, with grossly insufficient quantities of food. At one point, 15 people lived in single rooms without sanitation. Jews were not allowed to own fur products. People trying to cross the fence illegally were shot in the back by the dozen. A typhus epidemic broke out in the winter of 1941–42. There were five labour camps set up by the Germans in the vicinity of the ghetto.

1. Camp I – Army Food Storehouse No. 6 (Armeeverpflegungslager, A.V.L.) (Note: National Archives and Records Service, German military symbols and abbreviations: Armecverpflegungslager, Washington 1978, Library of Congress, p. ix (11/306 in PDF). Retrieved 3 November 2015.) at the Polish Army base, with the active labour force of 100 prisoners (1940–42). The total number of Jews who passed through the camp was around 5,000.
2. Camp II – The Reckmann Construction (close to the fire station). Active labour force: 500 prisoners (1941–43). The total number of 15,000 Jews passed through the facility; decimated by epidemic of typhus and scarlet fever. Remaining prisoners were shot on site during camp liquidation.
3. Camp III – Building Inspectorate No. 8 "Kiesgrube" (at the Łuków road). Active labour force: 300 prisoners (1941–43), housed in two barracks; with 250 grams of bread and 1 litre of soup per day. One prisoner is known to have survived.
4. Camp IV – Wolfer and Göbel Road Construction (10 barracks, next to Brzeska Street). Active labour force: 2,000 prisoners (1941–42). Counting in the ill persons, released for threat of an epidemic, as well as Jewish men brought in from other settlements – not from the ghetto – some 20,000 Jews passed through the camp.
5. Camp V – "Bauzug", at the railway station. Active labour force: 100 prisoners repairing railway tracks (1942–43).

In early 1942 the Final Solution to the Jewish Question was set in motion by Nazi Germany during the Wannsee Conference; and the fate of ghettoised Jews across occupied Poland was sealed. The Treblinka extermination camp – built north of Siedlce exclusively for the implementation of Operation Reinhard – began gassing Jews in July 1942. The next month, on 22 August 1942 the Siedlce Ghetto liquidation action began in earnest, under SS-Obersturmführer Schultz. The Judenrat has been informed about mass "transfer to the east" personally by Gruppenführer Ludwig Fischer, the governor of Distrikt Warschau. People unable to move and attempting to hide were shot in their homes by the roaming squads of Trawniki men aided by the Orpo battalion who arrived in Siedlce from Łosice for that express purpose.

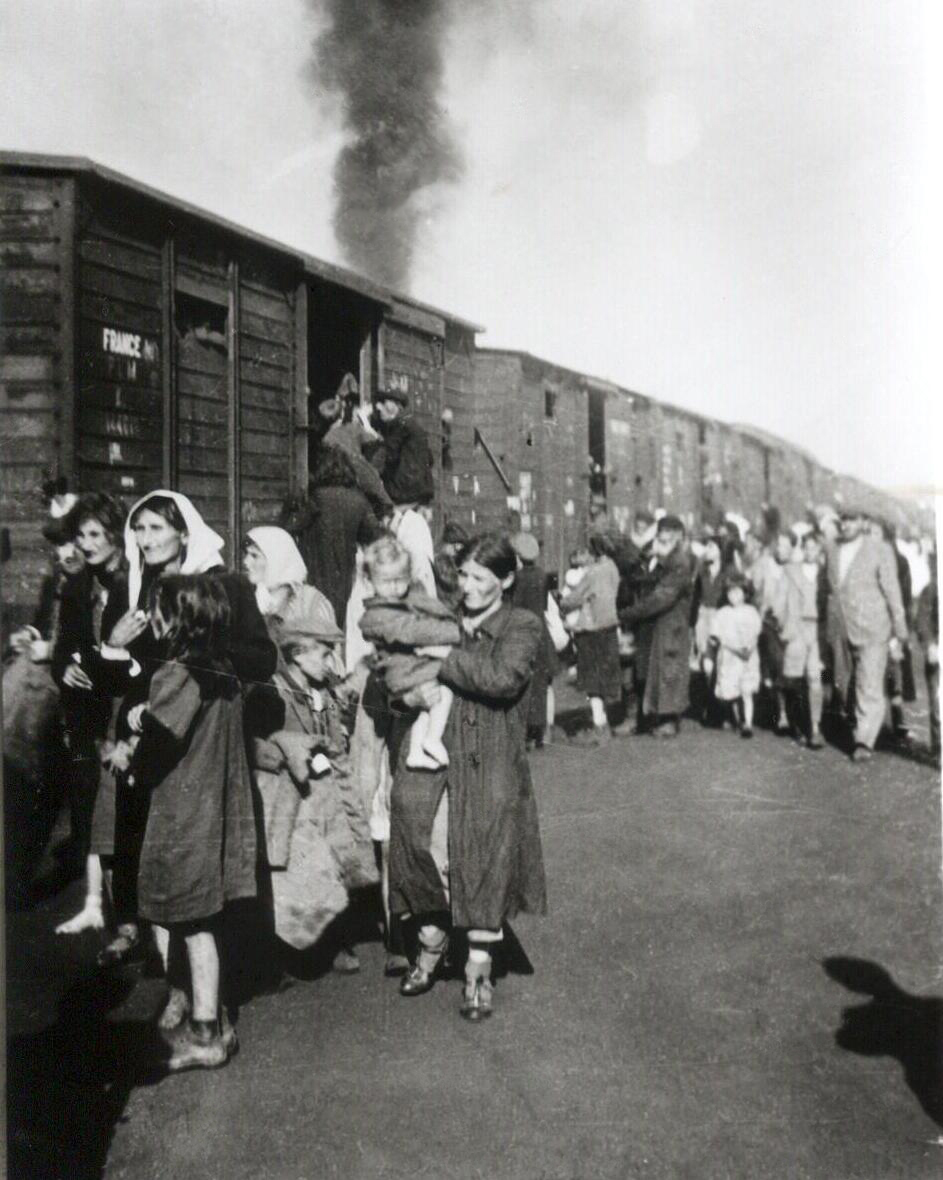
Deportation of 10,000 Polish Jews to Treblinka during the liquidation of the ghetto in Siedlce, beginning 23 August 1942

=== Ghetto liquidation ===
Around 10,000 Jews were herded into the square on 22 August, including all captives brought on foot by Orpo from the transit ghettos in three nearby settlements; (Note: They came from transit ghettos set up at the following locations; for the Łosice area, one in Łosice holding local Jews and families from Huszlew, Olszanka, and Świniarów; the second one for the Sarnaki area with Jews from Sarnaki, Górki, Kornica, Łysów; and third for the Mordy area, with prisoners from Mordy, Krzesk-Królowa Niwa, Przesmyki, Stok Ruski, and Tarków.) 500 men were selected to go back to their work camps. The rest were made to sit on the ground overnight, tormented and shot at. The next day they were assembled into columns and marched to the train station in utter terror; the connecting streets were full of dead bodies. The Jews were crammed into awaiting freight cars (pictured) and sent to Treblinka, 62 kilometres (39 mi) distance. (Note: Google Maps, Siedlce–Treblinka: 62.2 km via DK63 and on to DW627, 1 h 7 min without traffic.)

While the Jews from out of town were gathered at the square on the first day of roundups, local Jews were forced into the cemetery on Szkolna Street. The squad of Ukrainian Trawnikis has been sent by the Gestapo around noon time to conduct a shooting action there in order to inflict terror. (Note: The Hiwi Wachmänner guards known as "Trawniki men" (Trawnikimänner) were organized by SS-Hauptsturmführer Karl Streibel into two SS Sonderdienst battalions. As volunteers recruited from the POW camps for the Red Army soldiers, the Hiwis were tasked with the liquidation of the Nazi-era ghettos in occupied Poland. They also served at extermination camps and played an important role in the total annihilation of the Jewish ghetto uprisings. After the war, the last 1,000 Hiwis forming the SS Battalion Streibel blended with the civilian population in West Germany and disappeared from sight.) In the evening of 24 August 1942 – a day after the first Holocaust transport – some 5,000 to 6,000 people from the cemetery have been sent away to their deaths. Meanwhile, the overall number of Jews shot at the cemetery and thrown into mass graves was 3,000 estimated by the Polish historians. On the day of the "aktion", the Jewish hospital was liquidated, with everyone killed on site either in their beds or out in the courtyard.

By 27 August 1942, the ghetto was no more. The town's remaining Jewish slave workers were returned to the "little ghetto" and on 25 November 1942 marched to the Gęsi Borek colony under the pretext of reemerging threat of epidemic typhus; several thousand of them were massacred three days later, on 28 November. Their bodies were nefariously not buried, but sent to Treblinka in a freight train consisting of 40 wagons of corpses, which outraged the SS at the killing factory. The incident was described by Sonderkommando prisoner Samuel Willenberg who successfully escaped during the perilous Treblinka revolt, and who took part in the unloading of the freight cars. He described it in the following way in his book Revolt in Treblinka: "Even as we emptied twenty cattle cars, another twenty pulled up at the platform. These, too, were full of bodies. Again there were the brutal beatings of the Ukrainians and the SS men, and the hell began anew. We were bruised from head to toe. Again we emptied the cars of corpses, only corpses. In several hours, we hauled 6,000–7,000 of them to the Lazarett. We learned that the transport had come from Siedlce, a town about 60 kilometers from Treblinka." The last two box cars were filled with the victims' clothing containing nothing of any value.

The Siedlce Jewish community was not restored after Nazi defeat, and the town's later history lacked the hitherto conspicuous Jewish component. Survivors of the town's population established an association in Israel which in 1956 published a comprehensive memorial book on the community's history. One of the survivors, Yisrael Kravitz, published his memoires in 1971 as the Five Years of Living Hell under Nazi Rule in the City of Siedlce.

== Escape and rescue attempts ==
Throughout the existence of the ghetto, there were numerous escape and rescue attempts even though the exact numbers of Jewish survivors are unclear. Some managed to flee from the Nazis into the Soviet-occupied eastern Poland at the beginning of the war. Others managed to obtain Aryan papers from the Polish underground. Many Jews escaped from Siedlce in 1941. Sixteen survivors found refuge at the home of the Osiński family nearby, awarded medals of the Righteous Among the Nations in 1990 some fifty years after the fact. Financial help for the purchase of food was provided by the clandestine Żegota Council to Aid Jews, whose president Julian Grobelny lived 40 kilometres (25 mi) east of Siedlce.

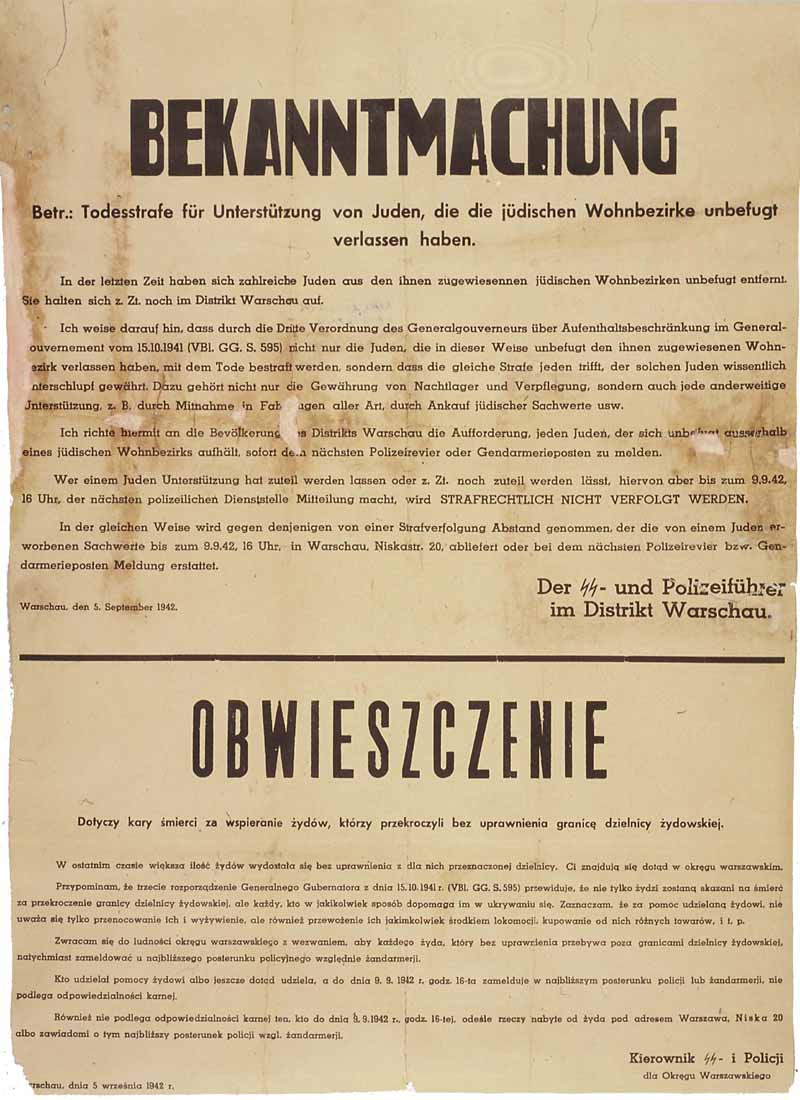
Public announcement of death penalty for Poles helping Jews leaving the Ghetto illegally, signed by the governor of Distrikt Warschau, September 1942

Young Cypora Zonszajn née Jabłoń with her little daughter Rachela managed to escape from the ghetto in August 1942. They were rescued by the Zawadzki family from Siedlce. Cypora could not live without her husband and her parents. She left the child with the rescuers and returned to the ghetto alone, in time for mass deportations. She took a poison pill when her husband Jakub was put on a death train to Treblinka, according to witnesses. Little Rachela was whisked to Zakrzówek in the summer of 1943 and survived in the care of Zofia Glazer (pl), and one of the Zawadzki sisters; all recognized as the Righteous in 1988. Zofia took care also of another Jewish girl, Dorota Maczyk (Monczyk), who survived the Holocaust with them.

On 17 December 1943 10 people were shot. One of the reasons was hiding of Jews.

== See also ==
- Timeline of Treblinka extermination camp, deportations: 22 August (Siedlce: 5,000 – Łosice: 3,500 – Mordy: 3,800), 26 September (Siedlce: 5,000), and 30 November, 1942 (Siedlce: 1,700) with references and supplementary data.
