= Zofia Olszakowska-Glazer =

Polish educator and resistance member

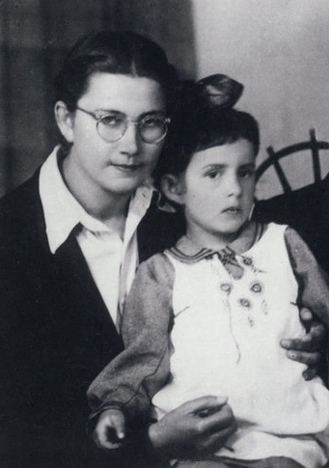
- Zofia Glazer with the daughter of Cypora Zonszajn, Rachela (Rachel) Zonszajn, in Siedlce, 1940s
- Born: Zofia Olszakowska; 12 April 1915; Siedlce
- Died: 20 November 2007 (aged 92); Warsaw
- Other names: Zofia Olszakowska
- Occupations: Educator, economist
- Known for: Holocaust rescue

Zofia Glazer, née Olszakowska (12 April 1915 – 20 November 2007), was a Polish educator and resistance member during World War II, involved in rescue of Jews during the Holocaust.

Zofia is known for rescuing Cypora Zonszajn née Jabłoń (1915–1942). The two were close friends from the prewar Gymnasium of Queen Jadwiga in the city of Siedlce, in the Second Polish Republic. Cypora (Cypa) was a Polish Jew born into an affluent family. Zofia was the daughter of a local Catholic pharmacist in Siedlce. They studied together for their final matura exam, after which the two girls went their separate ways until the Holocaust in occupied Poland.

During the September 1939 Nazi–Soviet invasion of Poland both women were in Siedlce, separated by circumstances beyond their control. At the end of November, the new German administration ordered the creation of a Judenrat. On Christmas Eve the Nazis set fire to the synagogue and burned it to the ground, with Jewish refugees inside. Cypora and her family were forced into the newly formed Nazi ghetto in Siedlce around August 1941. Over a year later, she wrote a first-person account of its murderous liquidation. Cypora committed suicide in November 1942 when her husband Jakub was put on a death train to Treblinka extermination camp. Her baby daughter Rachela survived the war in the care of Polish Righteous from Siedlce; whisked to a different town in the summer of 1943 by the same friend Zofia who adopted the child (temporarily) under the false Christian name of Marianna Tymińska given by a Catholic priest. In 1988 Zofia Glazer was awarded the medal of Righteous among the Nations in Jerusalem, a certificate of honor, and the privilege of having her name added to the Garden of the Righteous. Subsequently, on 10 October 2007 during a ceremony at the Grand Theatre, Warsaw, she received the Commander's Cross of the Order of Polonia Restituta from the President of Poland Lech Kaczyński for her rescue efforts, along with 52 other World War II rescuers of Jews during the Holocaust.

== Background ==
After her high school graduation Zofia enrolled at the Warsaw School of Economics, where she studied the cooperative movement. She was one of the protesting students against the Numerus clausus form of segregation introduced by the Sanacja government. She continued her studies in Sweden until the invasion of Poland, and came back to Siedlce as soon as the war began. She made contacts with the Polish underground resistance movement and became associated with the Bataliony Chłopskie partisans.

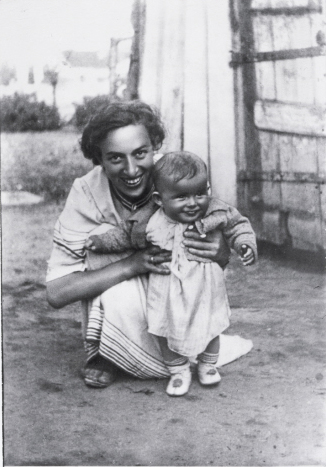
Cypora Jabłoń Zonszajn with her baby daughter Rachela (Rachel) Zonszajn, in the Siedlce Ghetto, 1942

Also from Siedlce, Cypora was one of five Jewish teenagers in Zofia's class. Upon graduation, Cypora enrolled at the Institute of Agriculture in Warsaw. Back in Siedlce, she married Jakub Zonszajn, a typesetter. Following the 1939 invasion of Poland, Cypora and her family were forced to move into the Siedlce Ghetto created by the occupational authority formally on 2 August 1941 and closed off from the outside on 1 October 1941. On that day, Cypora gave birth to her baby girl Rachela (Rachel). In order to provide for the family, her husband Jakub joined the Jewish Ghetto Police organized by the Judenrat Council on the orders of the Nazi administration in the ghetto. His decision helped them survive the ghetto liquidation action, but only for several months.

=== Treblinka deportations ===
The Siedlce Ghetto liquidation action began on Friday, 22 August 1942. Around 10,000 Polish Jews from three transit ghettos were rounded up at the town square. (Note: The out-of-town Jews came from the transit ghettos set up at the following locations; for the Łosice area, one in Łosice holding local Jews and families from Huszlew, Olszanka, and Świniarów; the second one for the Sarnaki area with Jews from Sarnaki, Górki, Kornica, Łysów; and third for the Mordy area, with prisoners from Mordy, Krzesk-Królowa Niwa, Przesmyki, Stok Ruski, and Tarków.) The next morning the men, women and children were marched to the Umschlagplatz and sent to Treblinka aboard awaiting Holocaust trains. An additional 5,000 to 6,000 Jews were forced into the cemetery and sent away to their deaths the following day by train. Cypora with her one-year-old Rachela (pictured) found refuge in the so-called 'small ghetto' (a.k.a. 'the little ghetto', or Drojek) thanks to Jakub, who organized their transfer, but the ultimate fate of the remaining Jewish prisoners could easily be guessed. Cypora joined a group of Jewish refugees at a house inside the little ghetto. There, she took care of another Jewish girl, Dorota Monczyk (Maczyk). Three days later Cypora learned about the hospital massacre by Orpo and left the Drojek ghetto under the cover of night. They came to the house of another one of Cypora's high school friends, Irena Zawadzka, on the Aryan side of the city.

Zofia Glazer and Cypora met again at the Zawadzkis house. The baby Rachela remained with the rescuers but the two girlfriends found a different place on the outskirts of town. Cypora wrote a secret account of the liquidation of the ghetto while in hiding. After a few days she met with Mrs. Sabina Zawadzka once more and formally entrusted her daughter to her. She gave Mrs. Zawadzka her ghetto notebook, and returned to Drojek to join her husband Jakub and her parents; they stayed there for two months.

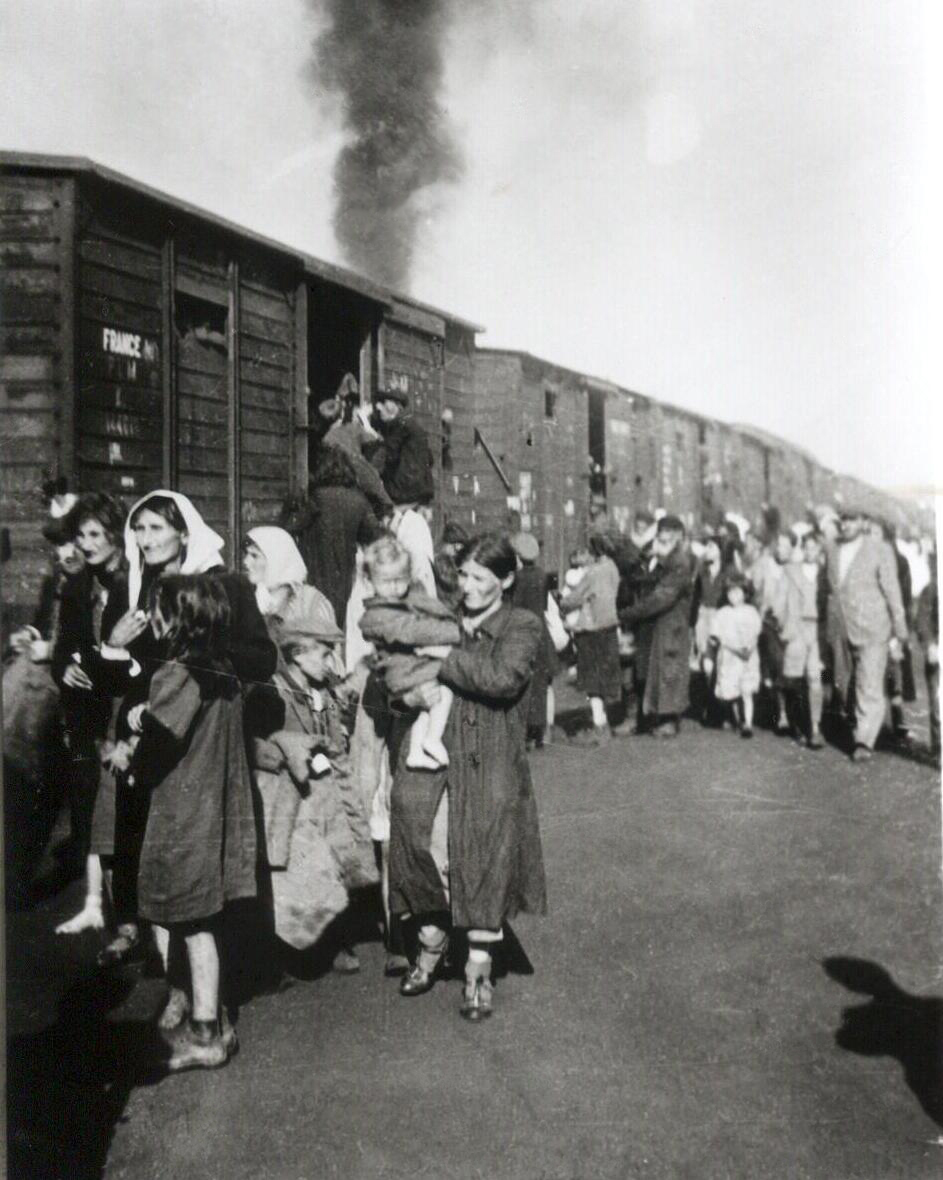
Deportation of 10,000 Polish Jews to Treblinka during the liquidation of the ghetto in Siedlce beginning 23 August 1942

On 25 November 1942 the 'small ghetto' was liquidated by the Orpo battalion who arrived in Siedlce for that express purpose along with a squad of Trawniki men. The Jews were forced to walk to nearby Gęsi Borek colony under the pretext of the reemerging threat of a typhus epidemic and waited there for the "relocation train", bound for Treblinka. Three days later, on 28 November, some 2,000 Jews were massacred by automatic gunfire along the railway tracks at Gęsi Borek. Their bodies were not buried, but sent to Treblinka in a freight train consisting of 40 wagons of corpses, which outraged the SS at the extermination camp. The last two box cars were filled with the victims' clothing, containing nothing of any value. The incident was described by Sonderkommando prisoner Samuel Willenberg who successfully escaped during the perilous Treblinka revolt. According to witnesses Cypora took a poison pill and died before the massacre, but her husband Jakub, was murdered in the process.

=== Polish Righteous among the Nations ===
The Zawadzki household of Polish Righteous included Sabina Zawadzka, her daughter Irena age 27 in 1942, and her grown-up son Kazimierz with his wife Krystyna. The family changed Rachela's name to a Catholic-sounding name – Maria Józefa – so she could live with them openly. After two months Irena Zawadzka attempted to get a "legitimate" birth certificate for Rachela and arranged for the local Catholic convent to take her in. However, the little girl soon fell sick and was taken back home. Rachela remained with the Zawadzkis until 1943, even though the house was in close proximity to the Gestapo office in Siedlce.

In the summer 1943, while the murderous Aktion Reinhard was coming to a close elsewhere, Zofia Glazer came to Zawadzkis, and took Rachela with her. They travelled to the town of Zakrzówek near Lublin. Zofia placed the child with her own sister, Irena (Olszakowska) Egerszdorff. She went to a Catholic priest and obtained a new birth certificate for Rachela in the name of Marianna Tymińska. They remained in Zakrzówek for six months. In the early winter of 1944 Zofia took Rachela to Sobieszyn, near Puławy. The Soviet army liberated the area in July 1944. Zofia and Rachela stayed there until June 1945. They returned to Siedlce after the war ended. Rachela went back to live with the Zawadzkis for a time; meanwhile, Zofia Glazer wrote a letter to Szymon Jabłoń (Jablon) in Palestine with the intention of adopting her. Szymon Jablon was Cypora's older brother and Rachela's maternal uncle who survived the Holocaust. He requested that the 4-year-old Rachela be separated from the rescuers and transferred to a Jewish orphanage in Warsaw for the purpose of her reunification with him as soon as possible, but circumstances had changed.

In the fall of 1945 Zofia Glazer took Rachela to Warsaw in tears and entrusted her to a Jewish organization in charge of transferring Jewish children to Mandate Palestine. Rachela was taken to France and put on a ship to Palestine with a group of Jewish orphans but the ship was turned back by the British. The children were returned to an orphanage in France. Irena Zawadzka went to visit Rachela (now Rachel) there in 1947 and found her disoriented and very sad, which made Zofia regret this for the rest of her life. Little Rachel reached Palestine after two years in late 1947, and lived with her uncle for just one year. She was placed in a boarding school and since 1953 lived in Kibbutz Ma'abarot. Rachel Zonszajn married in 1960. She stayed in close contact with Zofia Glazer and Irena Zawadzka in Poland.

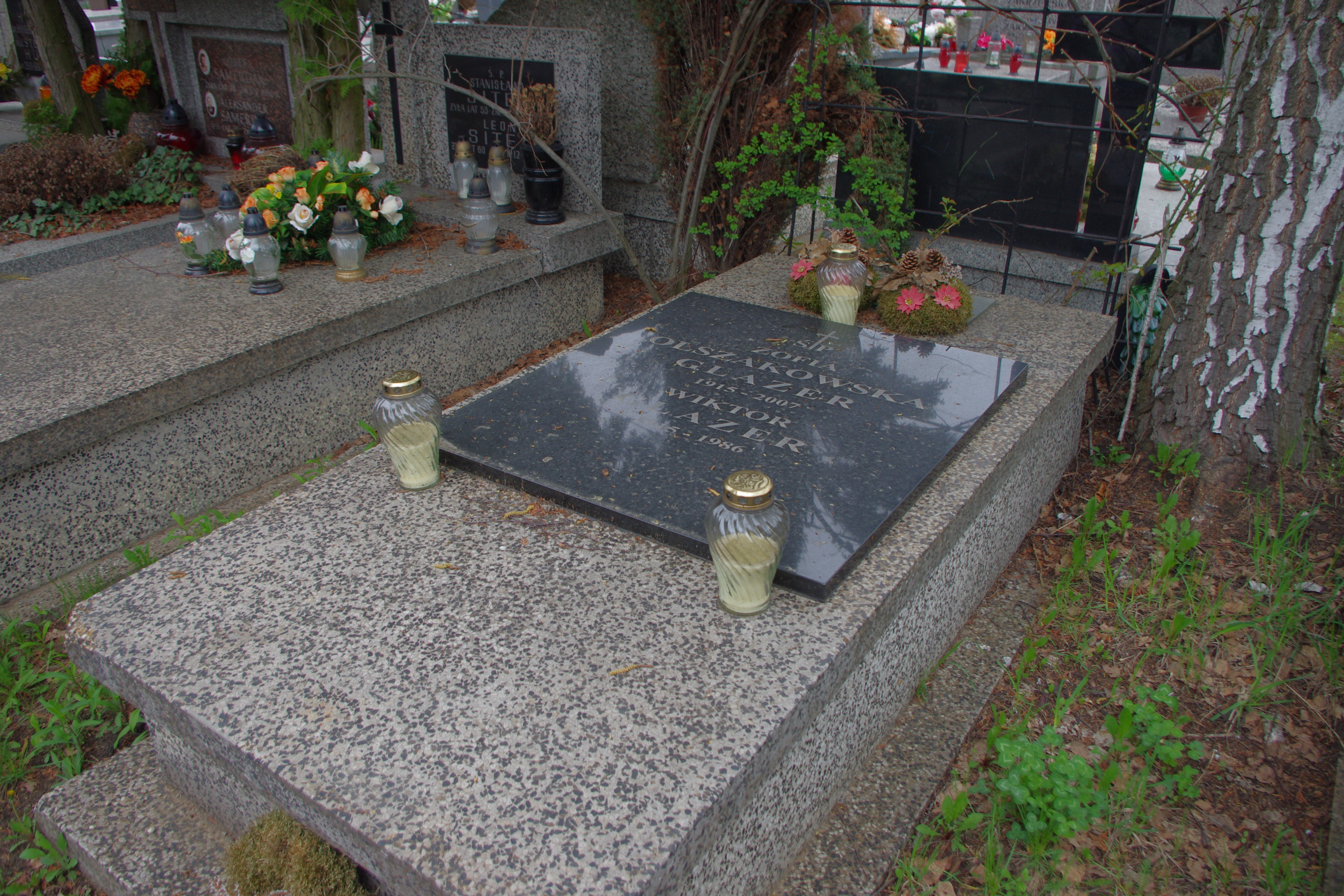
Grave of Zofia Glazer at the Warsaw Northern Cemetery (pl), 2007

Zofia Glazer first settled in Lublin in late 1945 and obtained a position with the state-run "Społem" organization (pl). From there, she was transferred to Łódź and taught cooperative movement at the Higher School of Economics for two years. She got married and relocated to Warsaw. Zofia and Irena Zawadzka were invited by Szymon Jablon to come to Israel for a visit in 1966 when Rachel was 25; however, Rachel did not remember much from her own childhood. Rachel visited Poland for the first time in the 1980s. On 25 May 1988 Zofia Glazer along with Irena Zawadzka and her mother Mrs. Sabina Zawadzka were awarded titles of the Righteous. Rachel died of brain cancer in 2002, leaving two sons behind. Zofia died on 20 November 2007 in Łódź, interviewed for the last time by Zuzanna Schnepf from the Shalom Foundation just before her death. She was outlived by her daughter. Irena Zawadzka died on 12 March 2012.
