= Rudka =

Rudka may refer to:

== Czech Republic ==
- Rudka (Brno-Country District)

== Poland ==
In Greater Poland Voivodeship (west-central Poland):

- Rudka, Czarnków-Trzcianka County
- Rudka, Szamotuły County

In Lesser Poland Voivodeship (southern Poland):

- Rudka, Gmina Wierzchosławice
- Rudka, Gmina Wojnicz

In Łódź Voivodeship (central Poland):

- Rudka, Radomsko County
- Rudka, Rawa County

In Lublin Voivodeship (eastern Poland):

- Rudka, Gmina Chełm
- Rudka, Gmina Ruda-Huta
- Rudka, Krasnystaw County
- Rudka, Gmina Tyszowce, Tomaszów County

In Masovian Voivodeship (east-central Poland):

- Rudka, Łosice County
- Rudka, Mińsk County

In Podlaskie Voivodeship (north-eastern Poland):

- Rudka, Bielsk County
- Rudka, Sokółka County

In Pomeranian Voivodeship (northern Poland):

- Rudka, Pomeranian Voivodeship

In Subcarpathian Voivodeship (south-eastern Poland):

- Rudka, Subcarpathian Voivodeship

In Świętokrzyskie Voivodeship (south-central Poland):

- Rudka, Końskie County
- Rudka, Ostrowiec County

In Warmian-Masurian Voivodeship (north Poland):

- Rudka, Warmian-Masurian Voivodeship

== Ukraine ==
- Rudka, a village in Novyi Bilous rural hromada, Chernihiv Oblast
- Rudka, a village in Babyn, Chernivtsi Oblast
- Rudka, a river in Ukraine, a tributary of Psel River
- Rudka, a river in Ukraine, a tributary of Styr River

== See also ==
- Rudky, a city in Sambir Raion, Lviv Oblast, Ukraine
