= Nowosielec =

Nowosielec may refer to the following places in Poland:

- Nowosielec, Podkarpackie Voivodeship (south-eastern Poland)
- Nowosielec, Masovian Voivodeship (east-central Poland)
