= Woźniki (disambiguation) =

Woźniki may refer to the following places:

- Woźniki, Piotrków County in Łódź Voivodeship (central Poland)
- Woźniki, Radomsko County in Łódź Voivodeship (central Poland)
- Woźniki, Zduńska Wola County in Łódź Voivodeship (central Poland)
- Woźniki, Lubliniec County in Silesian Voivodeship (south Poland)
- Woźniki, Zawiercie County in Silesian Voivodeship (south Poland)
- Woźniki, Lesser Poland Voivodeship (south Poland)
- Woźniki, Łosice County in Masovian Voivodeship (east-central Poland)
- Woźniki, Płock County in Masovian Voivodeship (east-central Poland)
- Woźniki, Płońsk County in Masovian Voivodeship (east-central Poland)
- Woźniki, Gniezno County in Greater Poland Voivodeship (west-central Poland)
- Woźniki, Gmina Grodzisk Wielkopolski in Greater Poland Voivodeship (west-central Poland)
