= Gmina Stara Kornica =

Gmina Stara Kornica Stara Kornica Commune
- Gmina
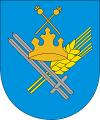
- Coat of arms
- Interactive map of Gmina Stara Kornica
- Coordinates (Stara Kornica): 52°10′N 22°51′E
- Country: Poland
- Voivodeship: Masovian
- County: Łosice
- Seat: Stara Kornica

Area
  - Total: 119.33 km^{2} (46.07 sq mi)

Population (2014)
  - Total: 4,998
  - Density: 41.88/km^{2} (108.5/sq mi)
- Website: http://www.kornica.org

Gmina Stara Kornica is a rural gmina (administrative district) in Łosice County, Masovian Voivodeship, in east-central Poland. Its seat is the village of Stara Kornica, which lies approximately 15 kilometres (9 mi) south-east of Łosice and 131 km (81 mi) east of Warsaw.

The gmina covers an area of 119.33 square kilometres (46.1 sq mi), and as of 2006 its total population is 4,917 (4,998 in 2014).

== Villages ==
Gmina Stara Kornica contains the villages and settlements of Czeberaki, Dubicze, Kazimierzów, Kiełbaski, Kobylany, Kornica Kolonia, Koszelówka, Nowa Kornica, Nowe Szpaki, Popławy, Rudka, Stara Kornica, Stare Szpaki, Szpaki-Kolonia, Walim, Walimek, Wólka Nosowska, Wygnanki, Wyrzyki and Zalesie.

== Neighbouring gminas ==
Gmina Stara Kornica is bordered by the gminas of Huszlew, Konstantynów, Leśna Podlaska, Łosice, Platerów and Sarnaki.
