= Walim =

Walim may refer to the following places in Poland:

- Walim, Lower Silesian Voivodeship (south-west Poland)
- Walim, Masovian Voivodeship (east-central Poland)
