= Nowe Szpaki =

- Village
- Location within Poland
- Coordinates: 52°13′44″N 22°55′7″E
- Country: Poland
- Voivodeship: Masovian
- County: Łosice
- Gmina: Stara Kornica

Nowe Szpaki [ˈnɔvɛ ˈʂpaki] is a village in the administrative district of Gmina Stara Kornica, within Łosice County, Masovian Voivodeship, in east-central Poland.
