= Patków, Łosice County =

Patków
- Village
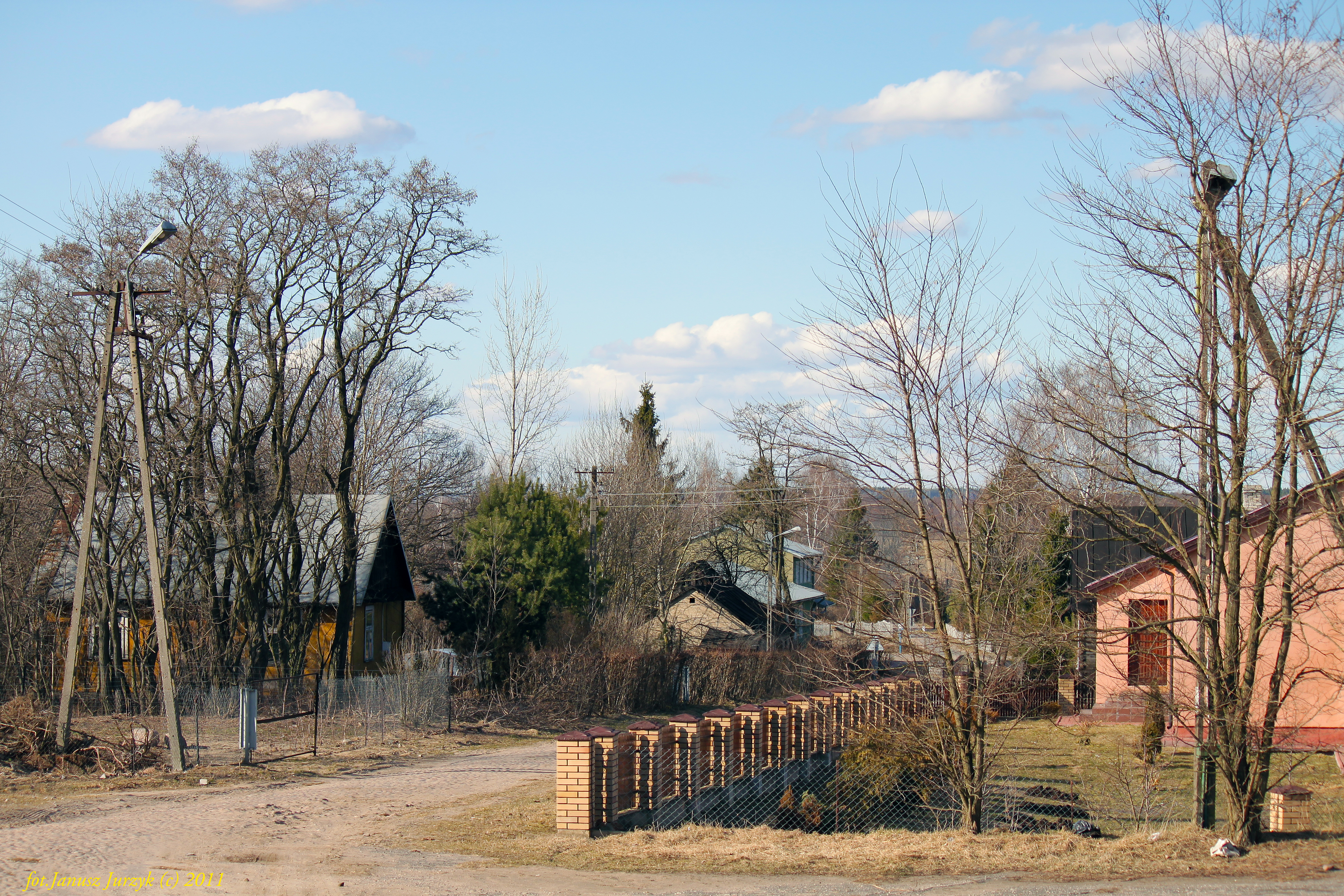

- Location within Poland
- Coordinates: 52°16′19″N 22°44′27″E
- Country: Poland
- Voivodeship: Masovian
- County: Łosice
- Gmina: Łosice

Patków [ˈpatkuf] is a village in the administrative district of Gmina Łosice, within Łosice County, Masovian Voivodeship, in east-central Poland.
