= Rudnik, Łosice County =

Rudnik
- Village
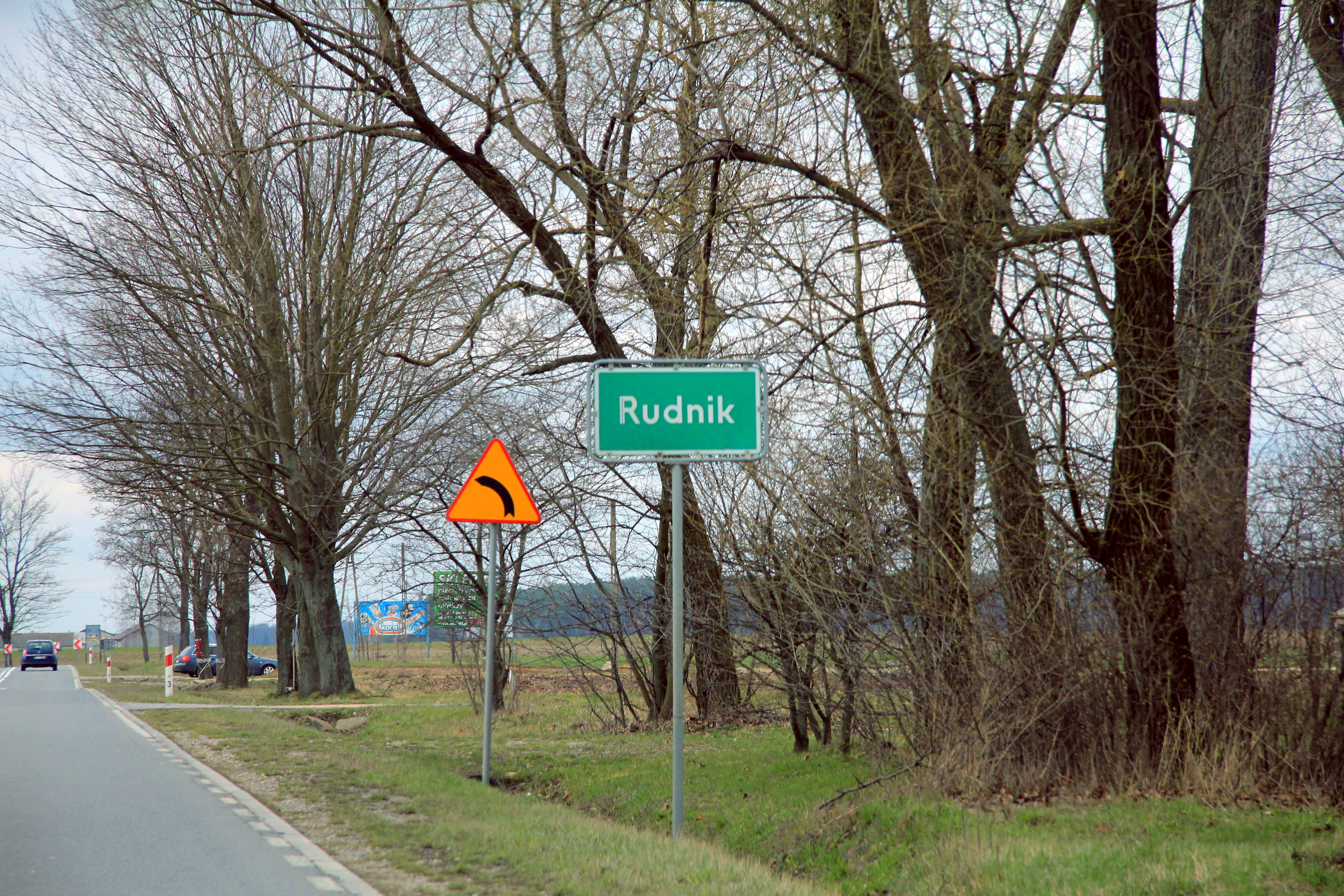

- Location within Poland
- Coordinates: 52°12′N 22°40′E
- Country: Poland
- Voivodeship: Masovian
- County: Łosice
- Gmina: Łosice
- Population: 196

Rudnik (Polish pronunciation: [ˈrudɲik]) is a village in the administrative district of Gmina Łosice, within Łosice County, Masovian Voivodeship, in east-central Poland.
