= Szańków =

- Village
- Location within Poland
- Coordinates: 52°10′51″N 22°42′36″E
- Country: Poland
- Voivodeship: Masovian
- County: Łosice
- Gmina: Łosice

Szańków [ˈʂaɲkuf] is a village in the administrative district of Gmina Łosice, within Łosice County, Masovian Voivodeship, in east-central Poland.
