= Gmina Łosice =

Gmina Łosice Łosice Commune
- Gmina
- Coat of arms
- Interactive map of Gmina Łosice
- Coordinates (Łosice): 52°13′N 22°43′E
- Country: Poland
- Voivodeship: Masovian
- County: Łosice
- Seat: Łosice

Area
  - Total: 121.22 km^{2} (46.80 sq mi)

Population (2014)
  - Total: 10,961
  - Density: 90.422/km^{2} (234.19/sq mi)
  - Urban: 7,102
  - Rural: 3,859
- Website: http://www.republika.pl/losiceonline/

Gmina Łosice is an urban-rural gmina (administrative district) in Łosice County, Masovian Voivodeship, in east-central Poland. Its seat is the town of Łosice, which lies approximately 118 kilometres (73 mi) east of Warsaw.

The gmina covers an area of 121.22 square kilometres (46.8 sq mi), and as of 2006 its total population is 11,258 (out of which the population of Łosice amounts to 7,252, and the population of the rural part of the gmina is 4,006).

== Villages ==
Apart from the town of Łosice, Gmina Łosice contains the villages and settlements of Biernaty Średnie, Chotycze, Chotycze-Kolonia, Czuchleby, Dzięcioły, Jeziory, Łuzki, Meszki, Niemojki, Niemojki-Stacja, Nowosielec, Patków, Prusy, Rudnik, Stare Biernaty, Świniarów, Szańków, Szańków-Kolonia, Toporów, Woźniki and Zakrze.

== Neighbouring gminas ==
Gmina Łosice is bordered by the gminas of Huszlew, Mordy, Olszanka, Platerów, Przesmyki and Stara Kornica.
