= Czeberaki, Masovian Voivodeship =

Czeberaki
- Village
- Location within Poland
- Coordinates: 52°12′13″N 22°51′2″E
- Country: Poland
- Voivodeship: Masovian
- County: Łosice
- Gmina: Stara Kornica
- Population: 150

Czeberaki [t͡ʂɛbɛˈraki] is a village in the administrative district of Gmina Stara Kornica, within Łosice County, Masovian Voivodeship, in east-central Poland.
