= Chotycze =

- Village
- Location within Poland
- Coordinates: 52°12′N 22°47′E
- Country: Poland
- Voivodeship: Masovian
- County: Łosice
- Gmina: Łosice
- Population: 400

Chotycze [xɔˈtɨt͡ʂɛ] is a village in the administrative district of Gmina Łosice, within Łosice County, Masovian Voivodeship, in east-central Poland.
