= Stare Biernaty =

- Village
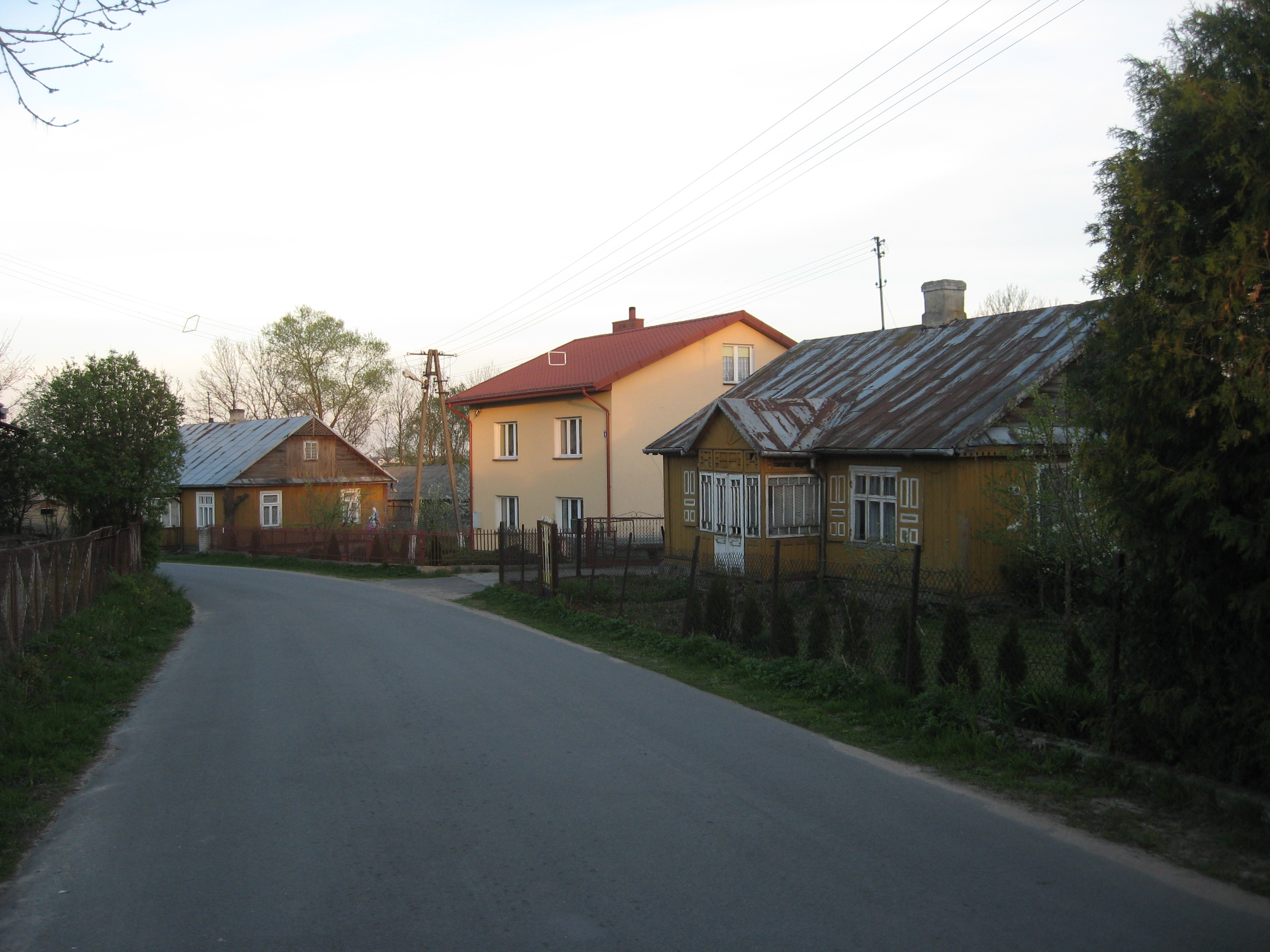
- Paved road in Stare Biernaty

- Location within Poland
- Coordinates: 52°13′47″N 22°40′43″E
- Country: Poland
- Voivodeship: Masovian
- County: Łosice
- Gmina: Łosice

Stare Biernaty [ˈstarɛ bjɛrˈnatɨ] is a village in the administrative district of Gmina Łosice, within Łosice County, Masovian Voivodeship, in east-central Poland.
