= Wygnanki =

- Village
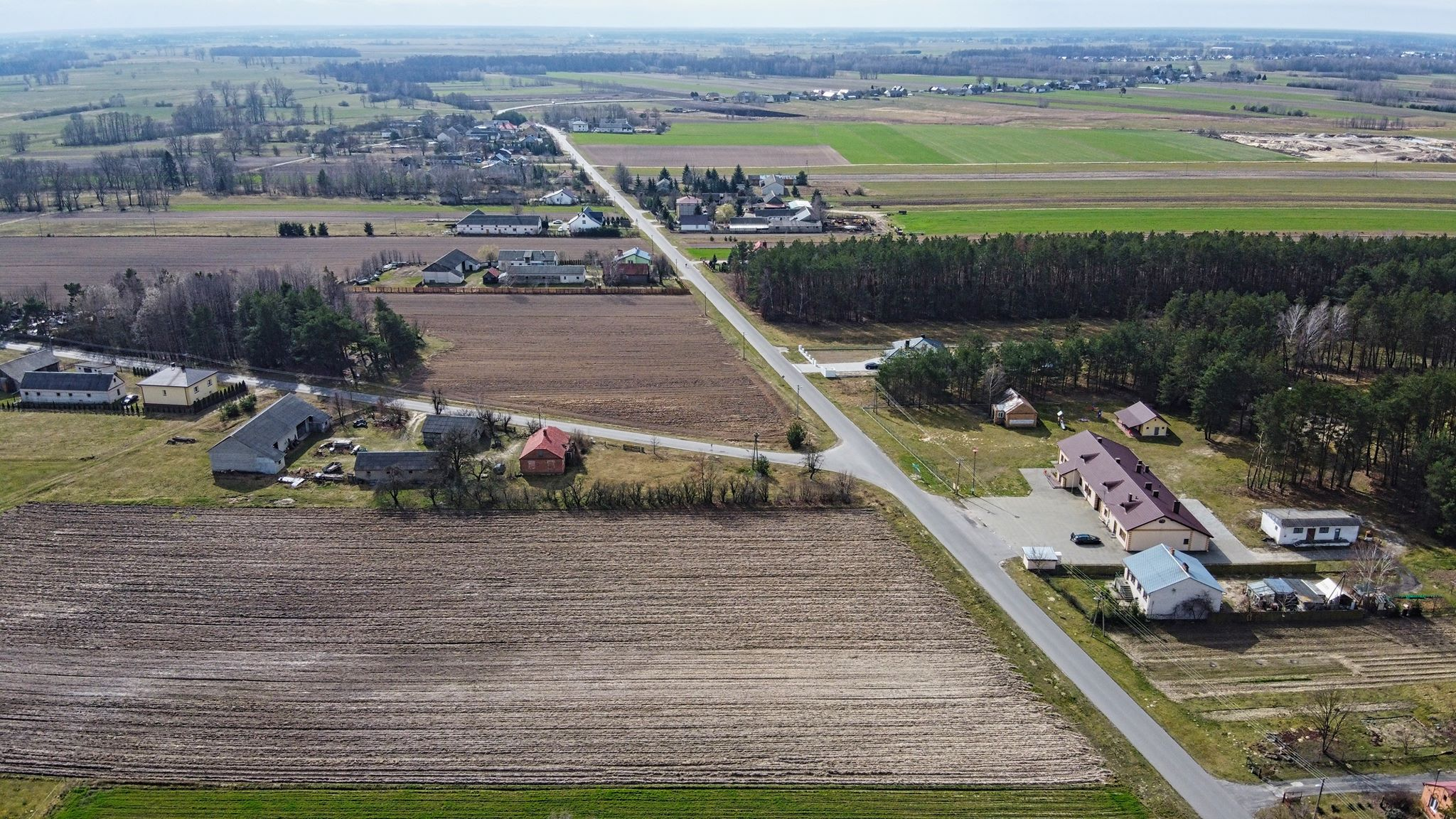

- Location within Poland
- Coordinates: 52°8′N 22°55′E
- Country: Poland
- Voivodeship: Masovian
- County: Łosice
- Gmina: Stara Kornica
- Population: 200

Wygnanki [vɨɡˈnaŋki] is a village in the administrative district of Gmina Stara Kornica, within Łosice County, Masovian Voivodeship, in east-central Poland.
