= Szańków-Kolonia =

- Village
- Location within Poland
- Coordinates: 52°10′42″N 22°44′5″E
- Country: Poland
- Voivodeship: Masovian
- County: Łosice
- Gmina: Łosice

Szańków-Kolonia [ˈʂaɲkuf kɔˈlɔɲa] is a village in the administrative district of Gmina Łosice, within Łosice County, Masovian Voivodeship, in east-central Poland.
