= Biernaty Średnie =

- Village
- Location within Poland
- Coordinates: 52°13′N 22°40′E
- Country: Poland
- Voivodeship: Masovian
- County: Łosice
- Gmina: Łosice

Biernaty Średnie [bjɛrˈnatɨ ˈɕrɛdɲɛ] is a village in the administrative district of Gmina Łosice, within Łosice County, Masovian Voivodeship, in east-central Poland.
