= Koszelówka, Łosice County =

Koszelówka
- Village
- Location within Poland
- Coordinates: 52°12′N 22°58′E
- Country: Poland
- Voivodeship: Masovian
- County: Łosice
- Gmina: Stara Kornica
- Population: 310
- Time zone: UTC+1 (CET)
  - Summer (DST): UTC+2 (CEST)
- Vehicle registration: WLS

Koszelówka [kɔʂɛˈlufka] is a village in the administrative district of Gmina Stara Kornica, within Łosice County, Masovian Voivodeship, in eastern Poland.
