= Szpaki-Kolonia =

- Village
- Location within Poland
- Coordinates: 52°13′55″N 22°52′25″E
- Country: Poland
- Voivodeship: Masovian
- County: Łosice
- Gmina: Stara Kornica
- Time zone: UTC+1 (CET)
  - Summer (DST): UTC+2 (CEST)

Szpaki-Kolonia [ˈʂpaki kɔˈlɔɲa] is a village in the administrative district of Gmina Stara Kornica, within Łosice County, Masovian Voivodeship, in eastern Poland.

Five Polish citizens were murdered by Nazi Germany in the village during World War II.
