= Niemojki-Stacja =

- Village
- Location within Poland
- Coordinates: 52°15′22″N 22°42′0″E
- Country: Poland
- Voivodeship: Masovian
- County: Łosice
- Gmina: Łosice

Niemojki-Stacja [ɲɛˈmɔi̯ki ˈstat͡sja] is a village in the administrative district of Gmina Łosice, within Łosice County, Masovian Voivodeship, in east-central Poland.
