= Niemojki =

- Village
- Location within Poland
- Coordinates: 52°16′N 22°42′E
- Country: Poland
- Voivodeship: Masovian
- County: Łosice
- Gmina: Łosice
- Population: 1,000

Niemojki [ɲɛˈmɔi̯ki] is a village in the administrative district of Gmina Łosice, within Łosice County, Masovian Voivodeship, in east-central Poland.
