= Czuchleby =

- Village
- Location within Poland
- Coordinates: 52°15′N 22°48′E
- Country: Poland
- Voivodeship: Masovian
- County: Łosice
- Gmina: Łosice

Czuchleby [t͡ʂuˈxlɛbɨ] is a village in the administrative district of Gmina Łosice, within Łosice County, Masovian Voivodeship, in east-central Poland.
