= Kornica Kolonia =

- Village
- Location within Poland
- Coordinates: 52°9′32″N 22°57′58″E
- Country: Poland
- Voivodeship: Masovian
- County: Łosice
- Gmina: Stara Kornica
- Population: 130

Kornica Kolonia [kɔrˈnit͡sa kɔˈlɔɲa] is a village in the administrative district of Gmina Stara Kornica, within Łosice County, Masovian Voivodeship, in east-central Poland.
