= Popławy, Masovian Voivodeship =

Popławy
- Village
- Location within Poland
- Coordinates: 52°11′46″N 22°51′3″E
- Country: Poland
- Voivodeship: Masovian
- County: Łosice
- Gmina: Stara Kornica

Popławy [pɔˈpwavɨ] is a village in the administrative district of Gmina Stara Kornica, within Łosice County, Masovian Voivodeship, in east-central Poland.
