= Jeziory, Masovian Voivodeship =

Jeziory
- Village
- Location within Poland
- Coordinates: 52°10′13″N 22°47′02″E
- Country: Poland
- Voivodeship: Masovian
- County: Łosice
- Gmina: Łosice

Jeziory [jɛˈʑɔrɨ] is a village in the administrative district of Gmina Łosice, within Łosice County, Masovian Voivodeship, in east-central Poland.
