= Kiełbaski =

- Village
- Location within Poland
- Coordinates: 52°09′19″N 22°55′15″E
- Country: Poland
- Voivodeship: Masovian
- County: Łosice
- Gmina: Stara Kornica

Kiełbaski [kʲɛu̯ˈbaski] is a village in the administrative district of Gmina Stara Kornica, within Łosice County, Masovian Voivodeship, in east-central Poland.
