= Kobylany, Łosice County =

Kobylany
- Village
- Location within Poland
- Coordinates: 52°10′N 22°54′E
- Country: Poland
- Voivodeship: Masovian
- County: Łosice
- Gmina: Stara Kornica

Kobylany [kɔbɨˈlanɨ] is a village in the administrative district of Gmina Stara Kornica, within Łosice County, Masovian Voivodeship, in east-central Poland.
