= Toporów, Masovian Voivodeship =

Toporów
- Village
- Location within Poland
- Coordinates: 52°12′8″N 22°47′15″E
- Country: Poland
- Voivodeship: Masovian
- County: Łosice
- Gmina: Łosice

Toporów [tɔˈpɔruf] is a village in the administrative district of Gmina Łosice, within Łosice County, Masovian Voivodeship, in east-central Poland.
