= Prusy, Łosice County =

Prusy
- Village
- Location within Poland
- Coordinates: 52°16′0″N 22°46′1″E
- Country: Poland
- Voivodeship: Masovian
- County: Łosice
- Gmina: Łosice
- Time zone: UTC+1 (CET)
  - Summer (DST): UTC+2 (CEST)

Prusy [ˈprusɨ] is a village in the administrative district of Gmina Łosice, within Łosice County, Masovian Voivodeship, in eastern Poland.

Nine Polish citizens were murdered by Nazi Germany in the village during World War II.
