= Wólka Nosowska =

- Village
- Location within Poland
- Coordinates: 52°11′N 23°0′E
- Country: Poland
- Voivodeship: Masovian
- County: Łosice
- Gmina: Stara Kornica
- Time zone: UTC+1 (CET)
  - Summer (DST): UTC+2 (CEST)

Wólka Nosowska [ˈvulka nɔˈsɔfska] is a village in the administrative district of Gmina Stara Kornica, within Łosice County, Masovian Voivodeship, in eastern Poland.

Eight Polish citizens were murdered by Nazi Germany in the village during World War II.
