= Chotycze-Kolonia =

- Village
- Location within Poland
- Coordinates: 52°11′34″N 22°46′41″E
- Country: Poland
- Voivodeship: Masovian
- County: Łosice
- Gmina: Łosice

Chotycze-Kolonia [xɔˈtɨt͡ʂɛ kɔˈlɔɲa] is a village in the administrative district of Gmina Łosice, within Łosice County, Masovian Voivodeship, in east-central Poland.
