= Zalesie, Łosice County =

Zalesie
- Village
- Location within Poland
- Coordinates: 52°14′N 23°0′E
- Country: Poland
- Voivodeship: Masovian
- County: Łosice
- Gmina: Stara Kornica
- Postal code: 08-205

Zalesie [zaˈlɛɕɛ] is a village in the administrative district of Gmina Stara Kornica, within Łosice County, Masovian Voivodeship, in east-central Poland.
