= Stare Szpaki =

- Village
- Location within Poland
- Coordinates: 52°14′08″N 22°53′13″E
- Country: Poland
- Voivodeship: Masovian
- County: Łosice
- Gmina: Stara Kornica
- Population: 200

Stare Szpaki [ˈstarɛ ˈʂpaki] is a village in the administrative district of Gmina Stara Kornica, within Łosice County, Masovian Voivodeship, in east-central Poland.
