= Rudka (Brno-Country District) =

- Municipality
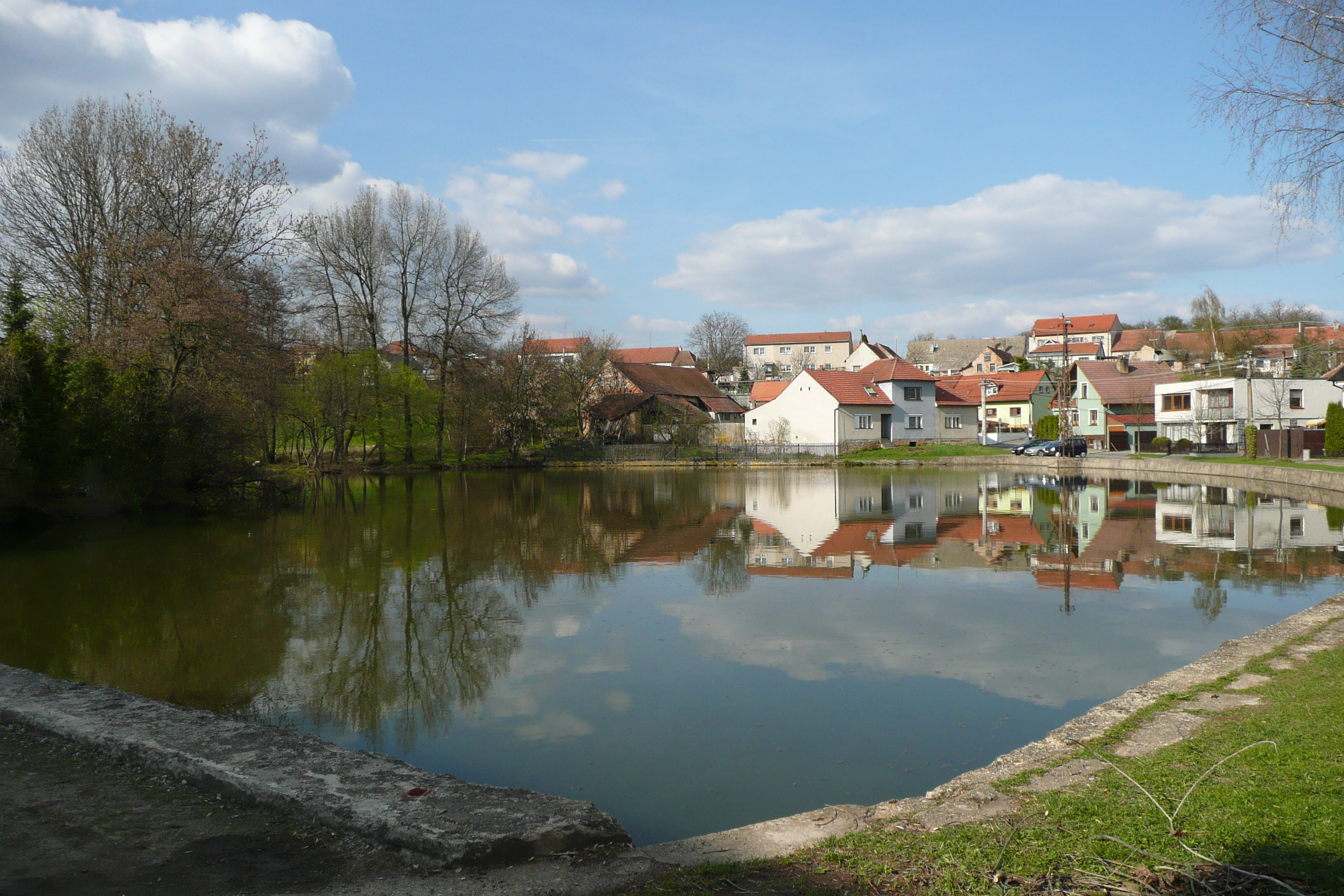
- Centre of Rudka

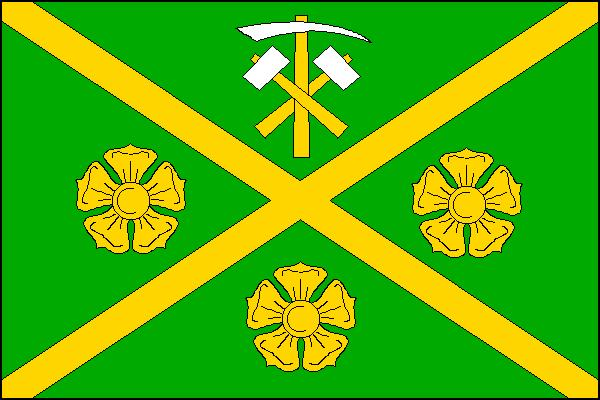
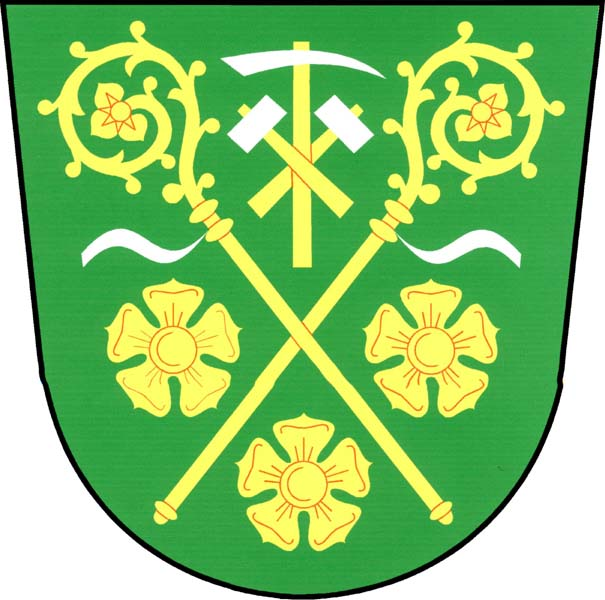
- Flag Coat of arms

- Location in the Czech Republic
- Coordinates: 49°14′33″N 16°19′52″E
- Country: Czech Republic
- Region: South Moravian
- District: Brno-Country
- First mentioned: 1330

Area
  - Total: 4.13 km^{2} (1.59 sq mi)
- Elevation: 445 m (1,460 ft)

Population (2026-01-01)
  - Total: 408
  - Density: 98.8/km^{2} (256/sq mi)
- Time zone: UTC+1 (CET)
  - Summer (DST): UTC+2 (CEST)
- Postal code: 664 83
- Website: www.obecrudka.cz

Rudka is a municipality and village in Brno-Country District in the South Moravian Region of the Czech Republic. It has about 400 inhabitants.

Rudka lies approximately 22 kilometres (14 mi) west of Brno and 167 km (104 mi) south-east of Prague.

== Demographics ==
Historical population
Year	Pop.	±%
1869	461	—
1880	446	−3.3%
1890	457	+2.5%
1900	474	+3.7%
1910	459	−3.2%
1921	464	+1.1%
1930	443	−4.5%
1950	419	−5.4%
1961	441	+5.3%
1970	397	−10.0%
1980	381	−4.0%
1991	353	−7.3%
2001	336	−4.8%
2011	374	+11.3%
2021	401	+7.2%
Source: Censuses
