= Woźniki, Łosice County =

Woźniki
- Village
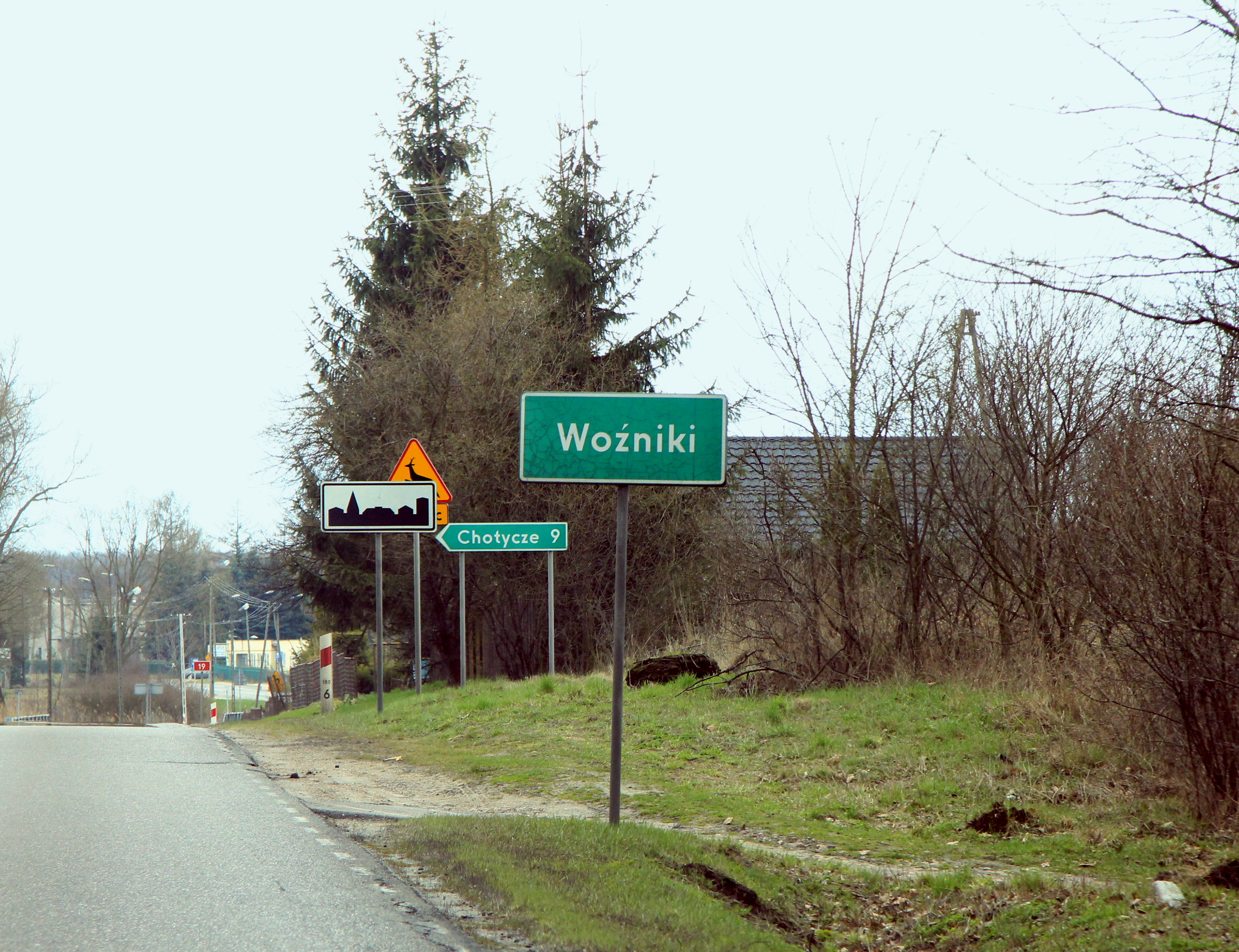

- Location within Poland
- Coordinates: 52°14′04″N 22°46′18″E
- Country: Poland
- Voivodeship: Masovian
- County: Łosice
- Gmina: Łosice

Woźniki [vɔʑˈniki] is a village in the administrative district of Gmina Łosice, within Łosice County, Masovian Voivodeship, in east-central Poland.
