= Mordy =

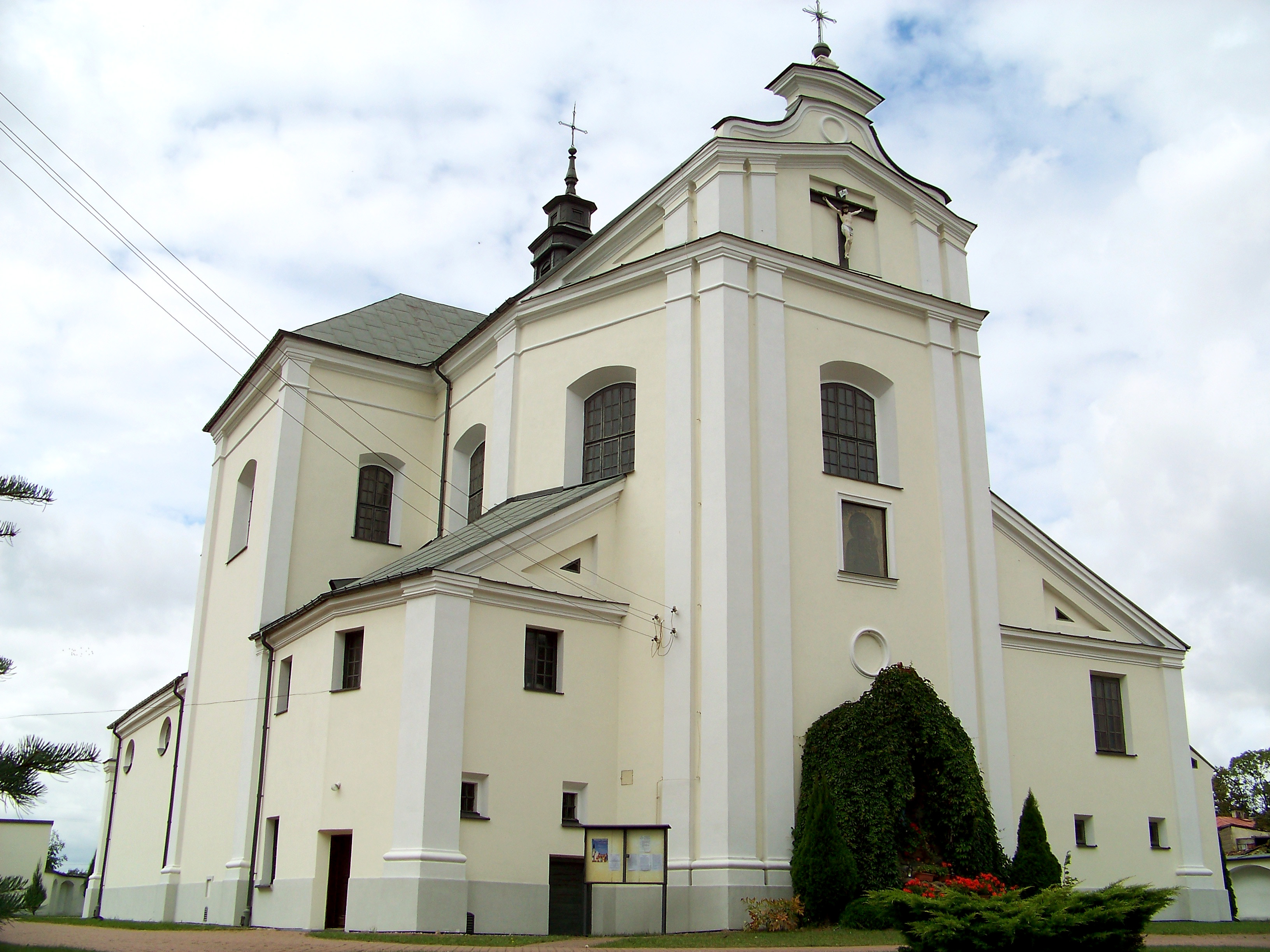
- Church of Saint Archangel Michael

- Coat of arms

- Location within Poland
- Coordinates: 52°12′29″N 22°30′43″E
- Country: Poland
- Voivodeship: Masovian
- County: Siedlce
- Gmina: Mordy
- Established: 15th century
- Town rights: 1488

Government
  - Mayor: Łukasz Albin Wawryniuk

Area
  - Total: 4.54 km^{2} (1.75 sq mi)

Population (2006)
  - Total: 1,840
  - Density: 405/km^{2} (1,050/sq mi)
- Time zone: UTC+1 (CET)
  - Summer (DST): UTC+2 (CEST)
- Postal code: 08-140
- Area code: +48 25
- Car plates: WSI
- Website: http://www.mordy.pl

Mordy [ˈmɔrdɨ] is a town in Siedlce County, Masovian Voivodeship, Poland, with 1,831 inhabitants (2004).

== History ==
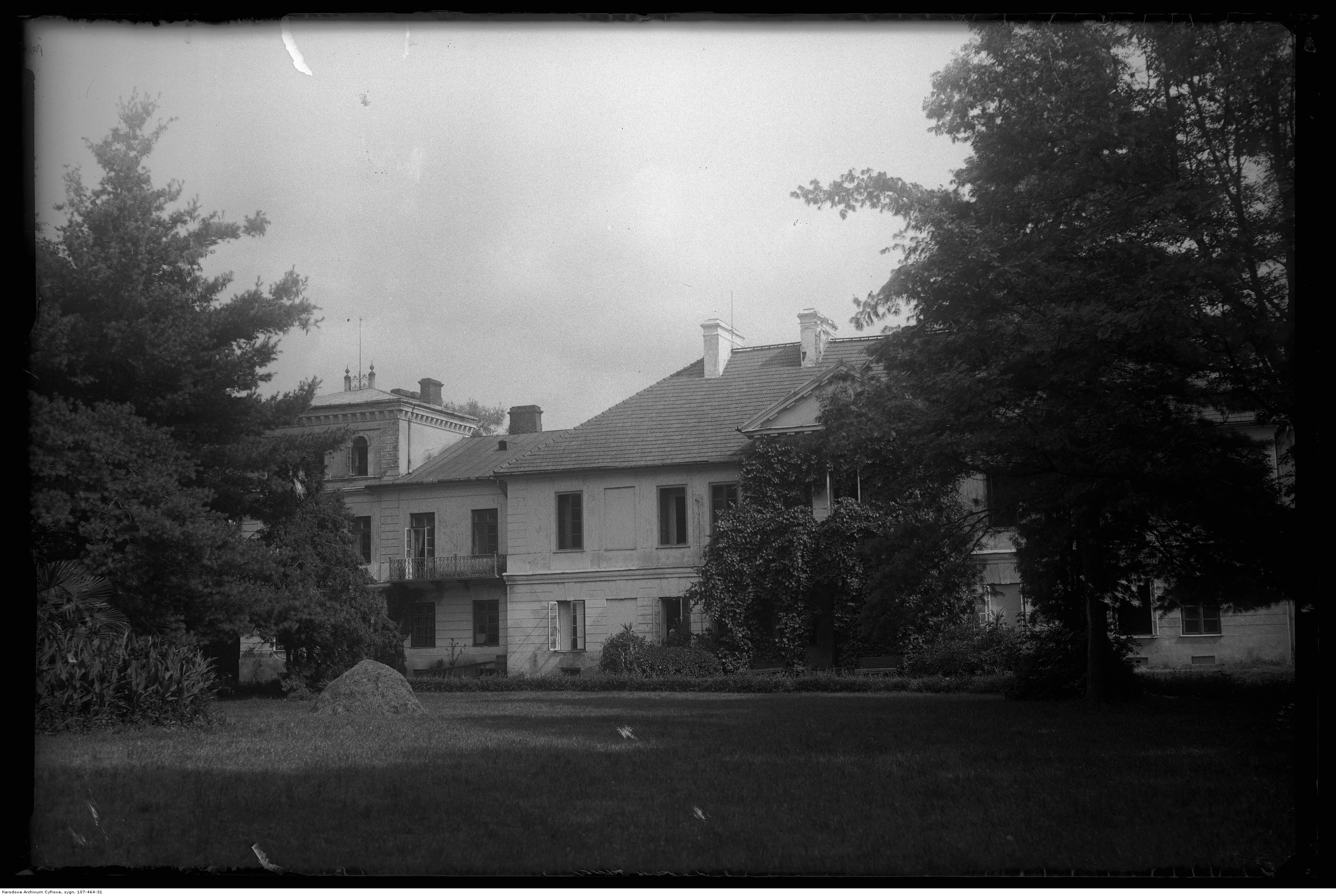
Mordy Palace in 1932

In the early 15th century, Mordy was a possession of Koszycki family. In 1408 Jan Koszycki founded a parish church in Mordy. Mordy was granted town rights in 1488. It was a private town of the Korczewski family and then the Hlebowicz family. In 1528, Mordy was purchased by Polish King Sigismund I the Old. In 1552, King Sigismund I sold it to Mikołaj Radziwiłł the Black, who then removed the local Catholic parish priest and replaced him with a Calvinist preacher. In 1563, a synod of the Polish Brethren was held in Mordy, and then the Calvinist preacher was replaced by a preacher of the Polish Brethren. In 1571, Mordy passed to Paweł Ciecierski and the church reverted to the Catholics. Afterwards Mordy remained a private town of the Ciecierski family of Rawicz coat of arms, administratively located in the Drohiczyn County in the Podlaskie Voivodeship in the Lesser Poland Province of the Kingdom of Poland.

The town was annexed by Austria in the Third Partition of Poland in 1795. After the Polish victory in the Austro-Polish War of 1809, it became part of the short-lived Duchy of Warsaw, and after the duchy's dissolution in 1815, it fell to the Russian Partition of Poland. The town saw an influx of Jews as a result of Russian discriminatory policies (see Pale of Settlement). After World War I, in 1918, Poland regained independence and control of Mordy.

=== Jewish community ===
After the First World War there were approximately 1,800 Jews in Mordy - more than half of its population. They were mostly employed in trade and peddling, while a few were tradesmen - mainly tailors and cobblers. The community ran a fund for loans underwritten by The Joint. There were several Hasidic Shtiebels in town, as well as Zionist parties such as the Bund and Agudat Yisrael. There was a Jewish public library and a Jewish culture club.

In 1920 Polish troops killed several leaders of the Bund, accused of supporting the Bolsheviks during the Polish-Soviet War.

The German army invaded Mordy in September 1939, but left after two days. The Red Army replaced the Germans only to retreat after some two weeks, and Germans re-occupied the town. In the following months Mordy, being close to the Bug River, served as a transit point for thousands of Jews who tried to move into the area controlled by the Soviets. Moshe Gershon Levenberg, a former chairman of the community, served as the head of the Judenrat, which was established in autumn of 1939. Many Jews were recruited as forced labor in a camp near Mordy, to drain swamps, together with Jews from other nearby towns. During 1940 an influx of Jewish refugees into the town began, and at the year's end, the number of Jews rose to about 2,000. In the spring of 1941, five-hundred Jews were brought to the camp from Warsaw.

In November 1941, a Jewish ghetto was established with 3,360 residents. At the end of 1941, Jewish refugees were brought into the ghetto, and by May 1942 the number of inhabitants rose to 3,817. At the beginning of 1942 the SS executed some Jews who smuggled food. During May and June 1942, some 450 Jewish refugees arrived from Łódź, Kraków and other places. The Mordy ghetto was liquidated on August 22, 1942. All residents, about 4,500 people were transferred to Siedlce, then deported to Treblinka extermination camp together with Jews from other places in the area.

== Transport ==
Mordy lies on voivodeship road 698 which connects it to Siedlce to the west and to Łosice to the east.

Mordy has a station on the Siedlce-Białystok railway line.
