= Stok Ruski =

- Village
- Location within Poland
- Coordinates: 52°13′N 22°27′E
- Country: Poland
- Voivodeship: Masovian
- County: Siedlce
- Gmina: Mordy
- Time zone: UTC+1 (CET)
  - Summer (DST): UTC+2 (CEST)

Stok Ruski [ˈstɔk ˈruski] is a village in the administrative district of Gmina Mordy, within Siedlce County, Masovian Voivodeship, in eastern Poland.

Nine Polish citizens were murdered by Nazi Germany in the village during World War II.
