= Stara Kornica =

- Village
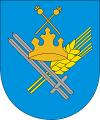
- Coat of arms

- Location within Poland
- Coordinates: 52°10′N 22°51′E
- Country: Poland
- Voivodeship: Masovian
- County: Łosice
- Gmina: Stara Kornica
- Population: 1,088

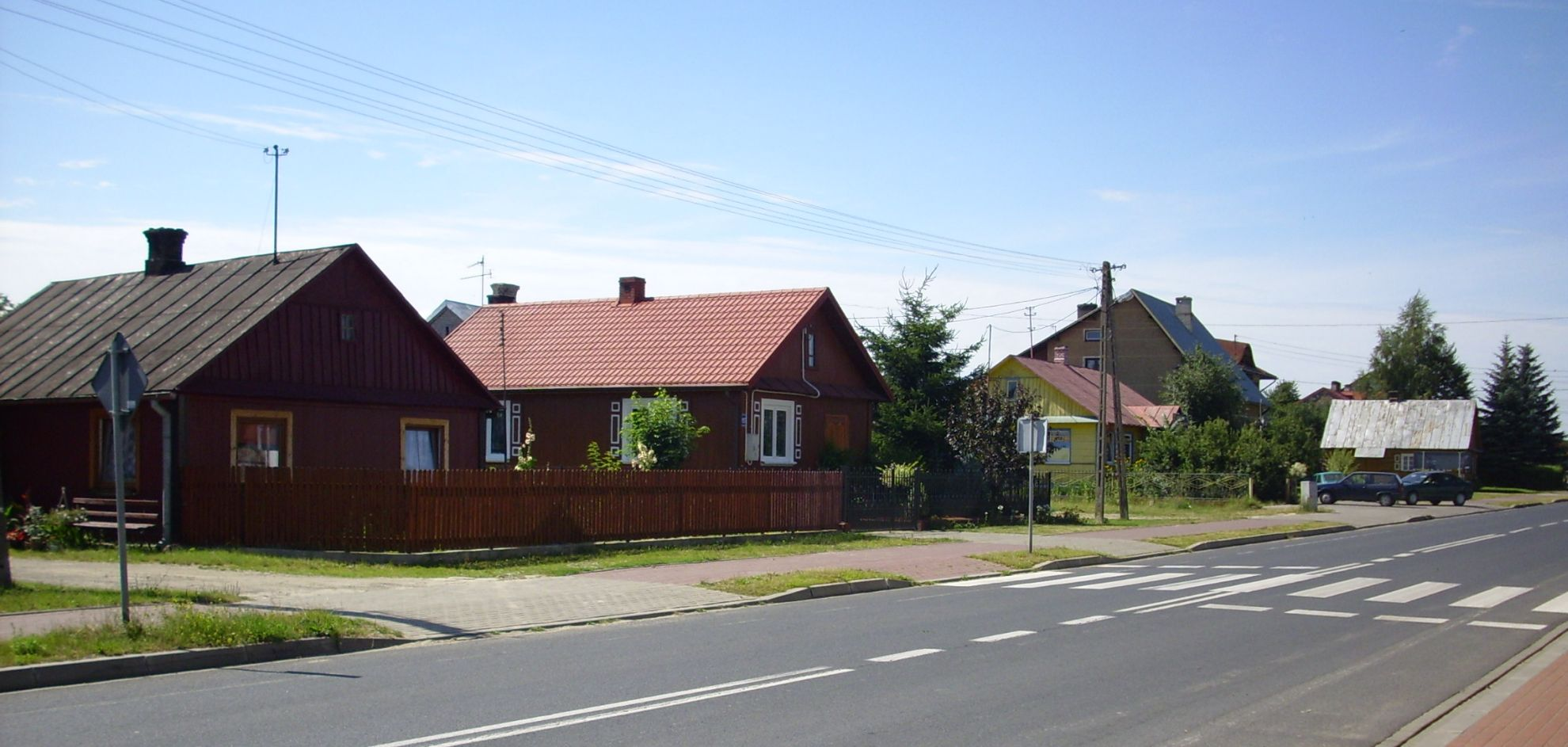
Stara Kornica (łosicki district, Mazowieckie Voivodeship, Poland)

Stara Kornica [ˈstara kɔrˈnit͡sa] is a village in Łosice County, Masovian Voivodeship, in east-central Poland. It is the seat of the gmina (administrative district) called Gmina Stara Kornica.
