= Górki, Łosice County =

Górki
- Village
- Location within Poland
- Coordinates: 52°15′N 22°50′E
- Country: Poland
- Voivodeship: Masovian
- County: Łosice
- Gmina: Platerów

Górki [ˈɡurki] is a village in the administrative district of Gmina Platerów, within Łosice County, Masovian Voivodeship, in east-central Poland.
