= Krzesk-Królowa Niwa =

- Village
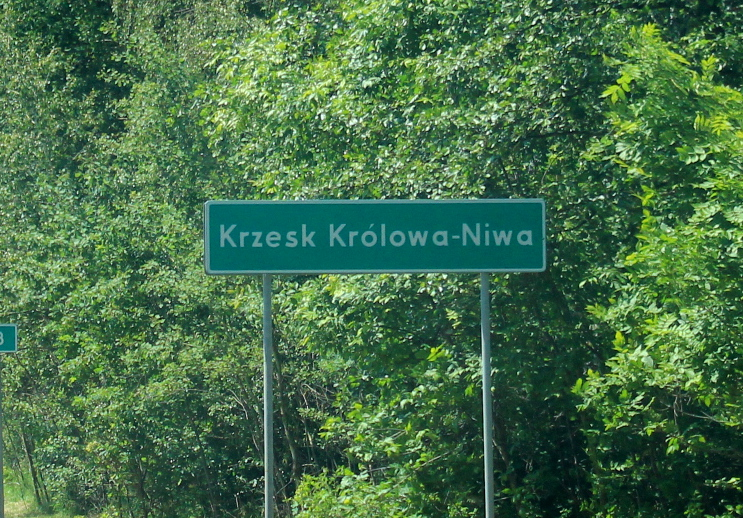

- Location within Poland
- Coordinates: 52°03′58″N 22°36′49″E
- Country: Poland
- Voivodeship: Masovian
- County: Siedlce
- Gmina: Zbuczyn

Population
  - Total: 630

Krzesk-Królowa Niwa [ˈkʂɛsk kruˈlɔva ˈniva] is a village in the administrative district of Gmina Zbuczyn, within Siedlce County, Masovian Voivodeship, in east-central Poland.
