= Łosice =

Town in Poland

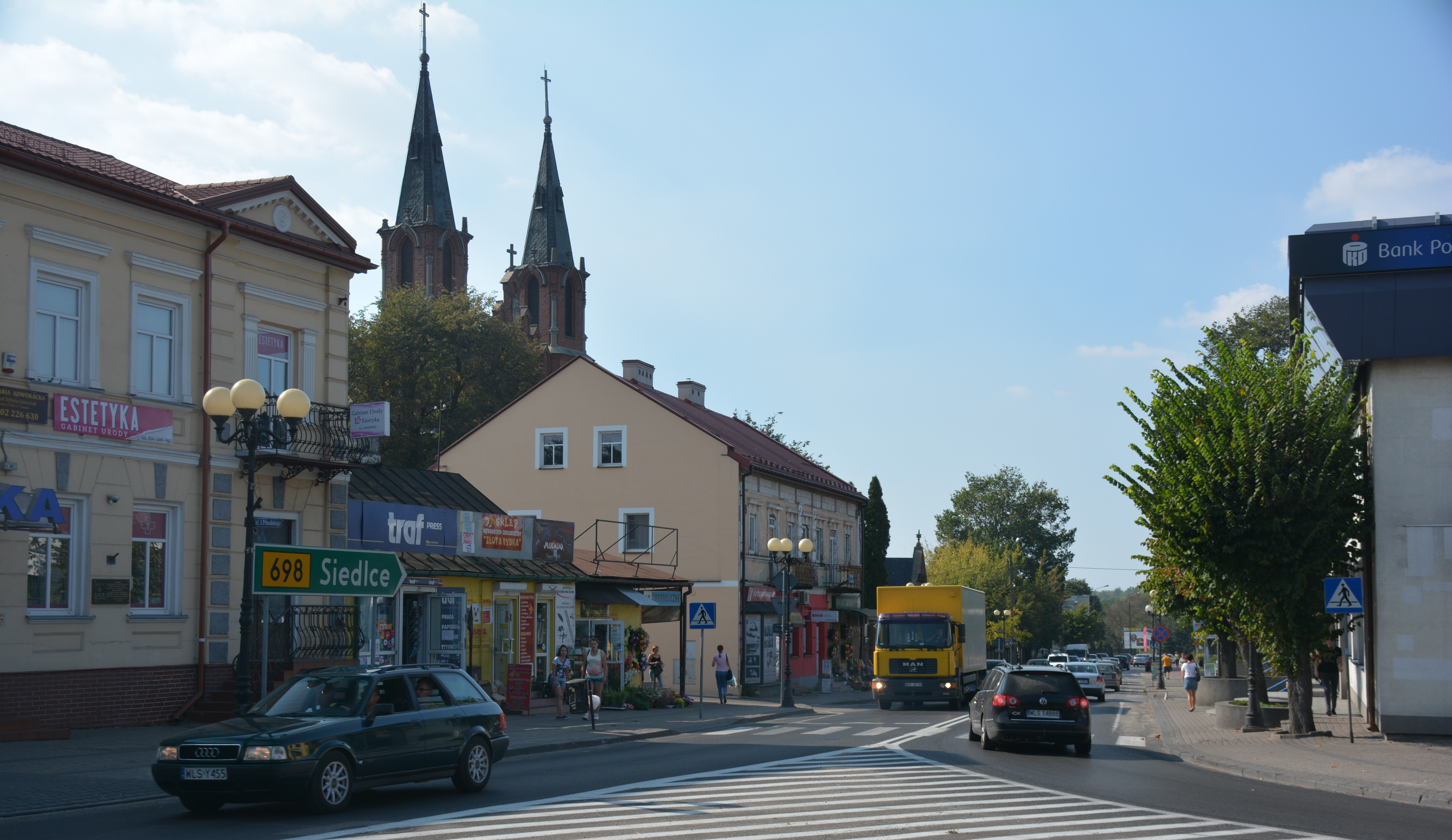
- Main road

- Coat of arms

- Location within Poland
- Coordinates: 52°13′N 22°43′E
- Country: Poland
- Voivodeship: Masovian
- County: Łosice
- Gmina: Łosice
- Established: 13th century
- Town rights: before 1505

Government
  - Mayor: Mariusz Kucewicz

Area
  - Total: 23.75 km^{2} (9.17 sq mi)

Population (2020)
  - Total: 7,028
  - Density: 295.9/km^{2} (766.4/sq mi)
- Time zone: UTC+1 (CET)
  - Summer (DST): UTC+2 (CEST)
- Postal code: 08-200
- Area code: +48 83
- Car plates: WLS
- Website: www.losice.pl

Łosice ([wɔˈɕit͡sɛ]; Yiddish: לאָשיץ Loshitz) is a town in eastern Poland, seat of the Łosice County and Gmina Łosice (commune) in the Masovian Voivodeship.

== History ==
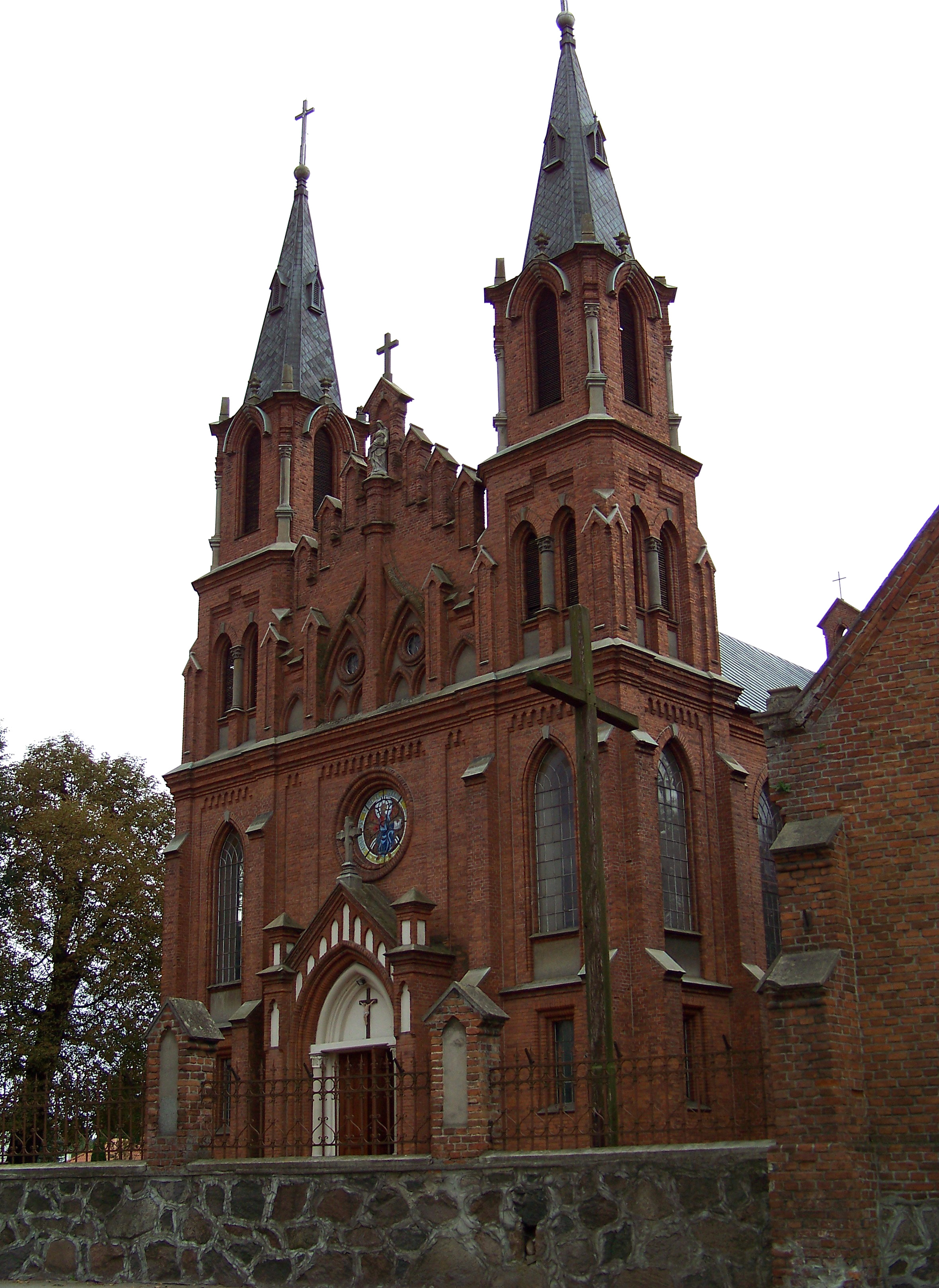
Saint Sigismund church

Łosice was first mentioned in 1264, as a medieval settlement from around the 11th–13th centuries; situated near the village of Dzięcioły. However, the location prevented the town's further development and in the late 15th and early 16th century, the community was moved to Łosice's present location. The first documented history of the town is preserved in the privileges issued by King Alexander Jagiellon in Radom on May 10, 1505; thus releasing Łosice from under the Ruthenian and Lithuanian city laws, and giving it more progressive Magdeburg rights. Private judiciary was revoked enabling the inhabitants to form a municipal government with a mayor and city council. The privileges allowed also for weekly markets and four fairs a year at a more convenient location; and, proposed the establishment of a town hall.

By 1551, there were two Eastern Orthodox churches, and two Roman Catholic churches in Łosice founded and endowed by King Sigismund I the Old. Throughout the 16th century the town enjoyed a period of economic development, with most inhabitants living off trade in leather, furs, and salt; as well as crafts, and a variety of services. According to a 1580 registry, there were 47 carpenters, 32 tailors, 20 bakers, 10 butchers, 7 stove fitters, and 4 blacksmiths in the town, not to mention millers, a locksmith, a goldsmith and a weaver. Łosice was a royal town, administratively located in the Mielnik County in the Podlaskie Voivodeship in the Lesser Poland Province of the Kingdom of Poland. A nearly complete destruction of Łosice came about during the Swedish Deluge of 1655–1660. Only in the second half of the 18th century, the town began to gradually recover.

In 1795, after the Third Partition of Poland Łosice fell under Austrian rule. It was regained by Poles following the Austro–Polish War of 1809, and included within the short-lived Duchy of Warsaw. As a result of the Treaty of Vienna in 1815, the duchy ceased to exist, and the town came under Russian rule. During the November Uprising a Polish battalion under Colonel Raczyński formed in the town with many local residents. Before and during the January Uprising against the Russian rulership, local doctor Władysław Czarkowski led a unit of several hundred conspirators in an attack against the garrisons. After the Uprising's defeat, the Russians brought reprisals against the Polish population. Łosice had been deprived of its Roman Catholic parish, and in 1867 lost its municipal rights. The process of Russification policies intensified right until the liberation of Poland. After World War I, in 1918, Poland regained independence and control of Łosice. In 1919, town rights were restored.

On September 12, 1939, during the German-Soviet invasion of Poland which started World War II, the town was taken over by the Germans, but shortly thereafter it was transferred to the Soviet Union. In the wake of the Molotov–Ribbentrop Pact, the town returned under German occupation. In 1944, it was restored to Poland, although with a Soviet-installed communist regime, which remained in power until the Fall of Communism in the end of the 1980s.

The Polish anti-communist resistance was active in Łosice. In 1945–1947, it carried out four raids of the local communist police station, and on 2 July 1946, the Home Army Resistance Movement and Freedom and Independence Association fought a battle against the communist police and Soviet NKVD and took control of the town.

In 1975–1998, it was administratively located in the Biała Podlaska Voivodeship.

=== History of the Jewish community ===
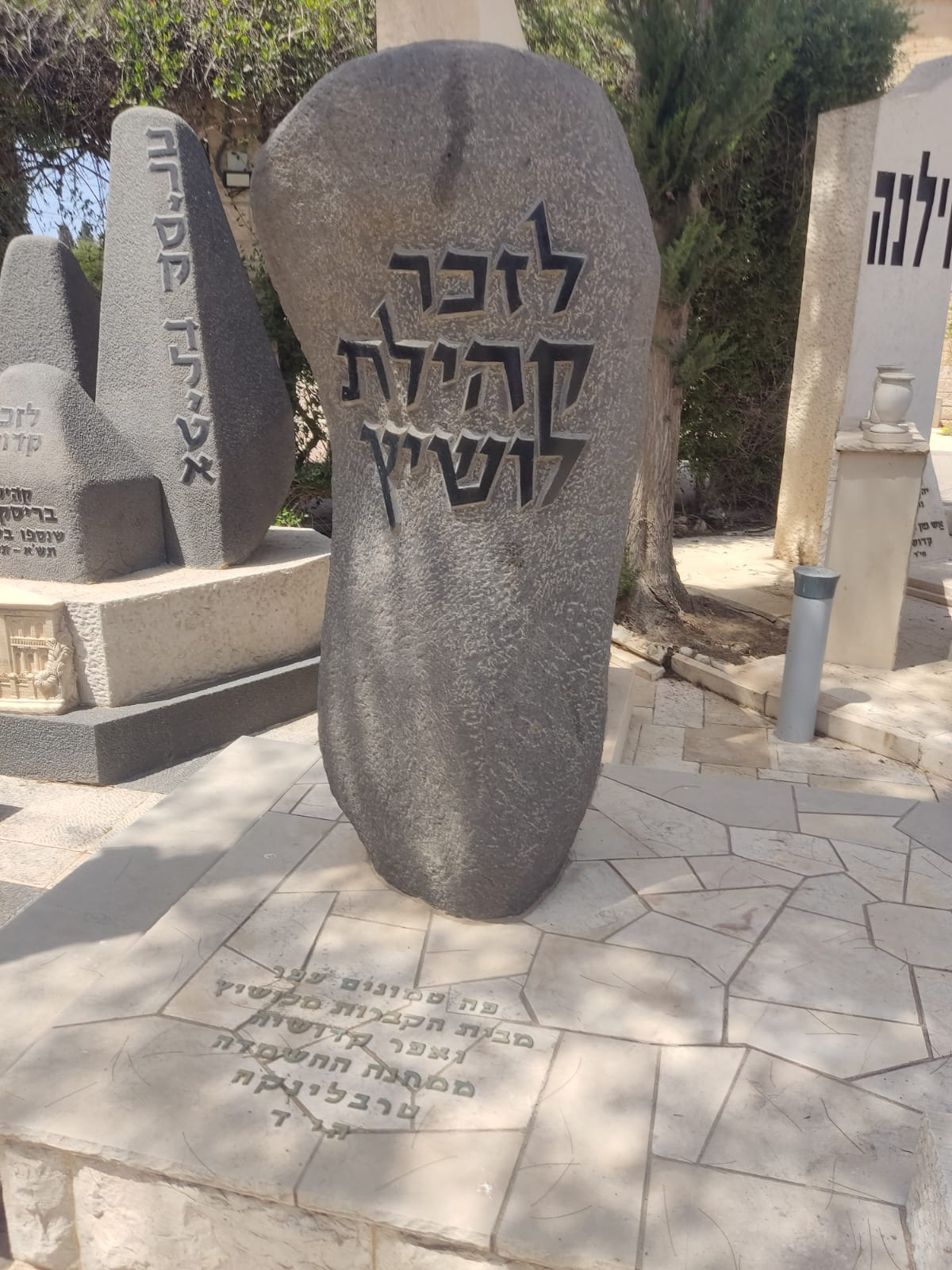
Monument to Jews of Łosice who were murdered in the Holocaust. In Kiryat Shaul cemetery in Tel Aviv

Between the world wars, there were approximately 2,900 Jews in Łosice, about 70% of its inhabitants. They were living a full life there, handling with politics, religion, economic, youth groups and everyday life. In 1920, a pogrom took place against the town's Jewish by the local Polish citizens.

On September 12, 1939, during the joint German-Soviet invasion of Poland which started World War II, the town was taken over by the Germans, but shortly thereafter it was transferred to the Soviet Union. In the wake of the Molotov–Ribbentrop Pact, the town returned under German occupation, and they began to rob and murder Jews. The Judenrat that has been established in the town in early 1940, headed by Gershon Levin, ordered hundreds of Jewish workers to be sent to forced labor in German labor camps. Later, many Jews from the surrounding settlements were brought into the town. In December 1940, the Jews of Łosice were assembled in the ghetto where other Jews were brought. Jews were executed from time to time. Payments were demanded from the Jews. In May 1942, the number of inhabitants of the Łosice ghetto reached 6,800.

On August 22, 1942, SS men and Ukrainian policemen raided the ghetto in the town and marched its Jewish inhabitants to Siedlce, killing about 1,000 people on the way, and the remaining 5,500 Jews were loaded onto freight cars and sent to the Treblinka extermination camp. The 300 Jews who remained in Łosice were sent off to be murdered on November 27, 1942. Just a few Jews survived the Nazi extermination camps and returned to Łosice in 1945, but they were violently expelled by the Polish citizens of the town, who took over the Jewish property.

== Points of interest ==
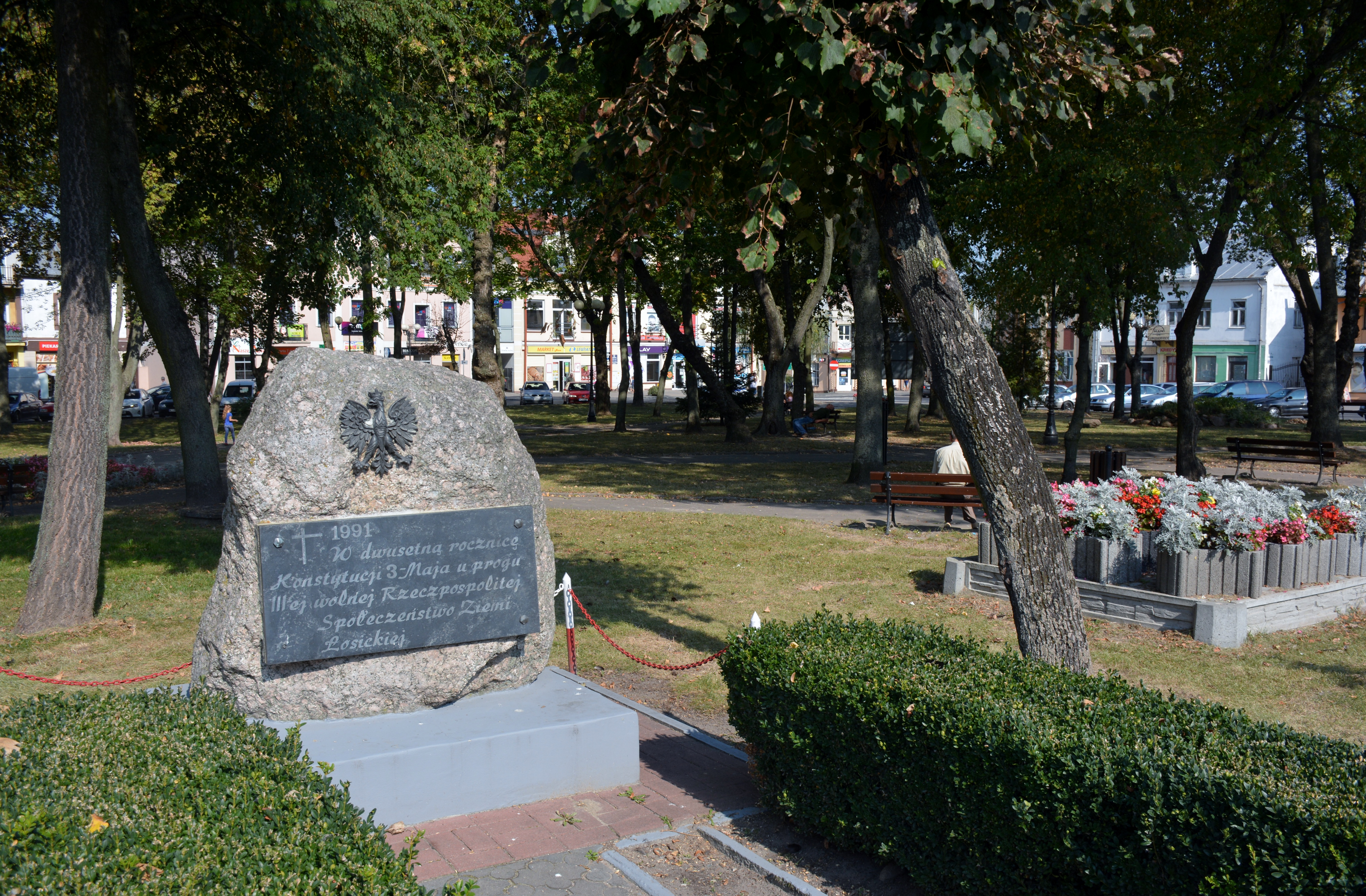
Monument to the Constitution of 3 May 1791 in the town center

- Neo-Gothic parish church of St. Zygmunt, built between 1906 and 1909.
- Former convent of Communion priests, rebuilt as hospital.
- Neo-Gothic cemetery chapel of St. Stanisław from 1845.
- Baroque roadside statue erected in 1775.
- Monument to Children of Zamojszczyzna who died in Łosice during the Nazi German kidnapping raid of 1943, located at the local cemetery.
- Parish church in Niemojki of 1783.

The biggest attraction in Łosice is a recreational reservoir, situated near the city center and the train station. In summer, there is a concession there as well as, kayak-and-water-bike rentals. The complex is located near the municipal park, built at the site of the former Jewish cemetery which was destroyed by Nazi Germany during World War II. The cemetery was established in 1690 under the privilege granted by King John III Sobieski. The collection of tombstones put on display, is the largest collection of Jewish sacral art in southern Podlasie region. The oldest stonework dates back to the first half of the 19th century.

== Notes and references ==
- Jewish Community in Łosice on Virtual Shtetl
- JewishGen Communities Database - Łosice
