= Town sign =

Type of road sign

A town sign or city limit sign is a road sign placed at the side of the road or street at the boundary of the territory of a city, town, or village. Town signs may be placed for reading both by drivers entering the town and, in a different format, by those exiting it. Signs give the name of the town in the local official languages, and sometimes in other languages. In some countries, town signs are also an essential part of the traffic law, for example by defining (explicitly or implicitly) the speed limit within the town's territory.

== By country ==
In some countries, such as Germany and Austria, town signs aren't placed exactly at the city/town boundary, but rather where the continuous urban area begins and ends.

=== Austria ===
==== Bilingual sign issue ====
On September 6, 1994, Austrian lawyer Rudi Vouk (of Slovenian ancestry) drove faster than the speed limit of 50 kilometers per hour while driving through St. Kanzian, also known as Škocjan. In the court case that followed, Vouk refused to pay the speeding ticket, arguing that the monolingual sign was unconstitutional.

In December 2006, the Constitutional Court of Austria found that city limit signs had to be bilingual. The facts of the case were that the district authority of Völkermarkt District had ordered signs for the city limits of Bleiburg, Eberndorf, and Schwabegg to be put up only in German. After this was found to be unconstitutional, the signs were also put up in Slovenian, but smaller; the court found that this too was unconstitutional.

As of 2010, the issue of bilingual city signs in Austria has not been resolved.

=== United Kingdom ===
In the United Kingdom, town sign may refer to a prominent, decorative, often carved sign, commemorating the values and history of the town. Synonymous with Village sign; Commonly in the centre of the town.

=== United States ===
In much of the United States, there is a similar county sign at the boundary between each county (or independent city not part of one), indicating the county being entered and often the one being left. Even if not done within a given U.S. state, there is also nearly always a welcome sign at the state line on every major highway, and most other roads. The welcome signs on Interstate highways are usually very large and have graphics, and may have an attached text-only sign directing motorists to the welcome center at a rest area. On smaller roads, they are usually more similar to town signs, showing the state and county, often with other signs indicating speed limit, a state law (such as "burn headlights during rain"), and/or a change in time zone.

== Gallery ==
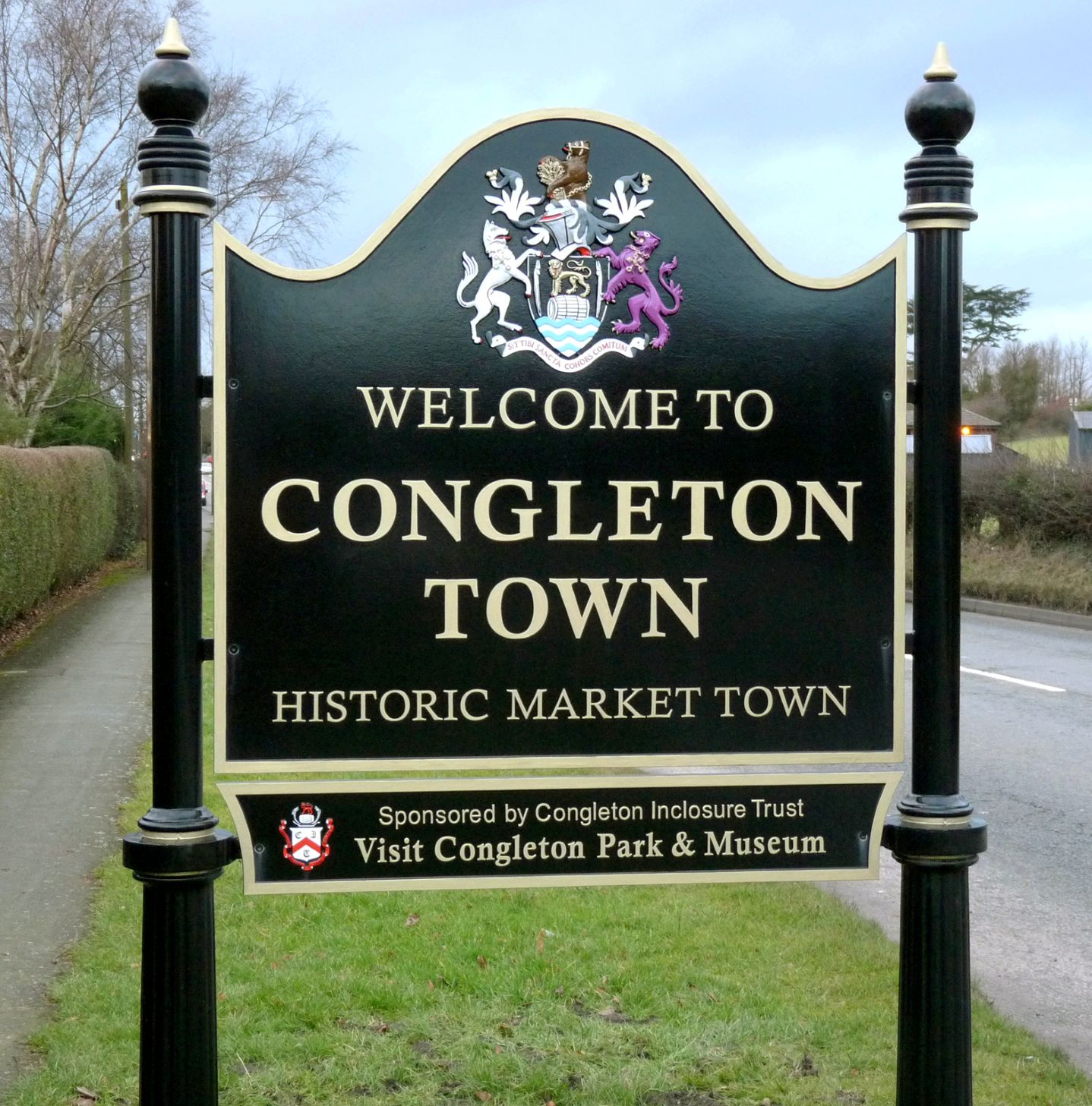
Cast aluminium welcome sign for Congleton, United Kingdom

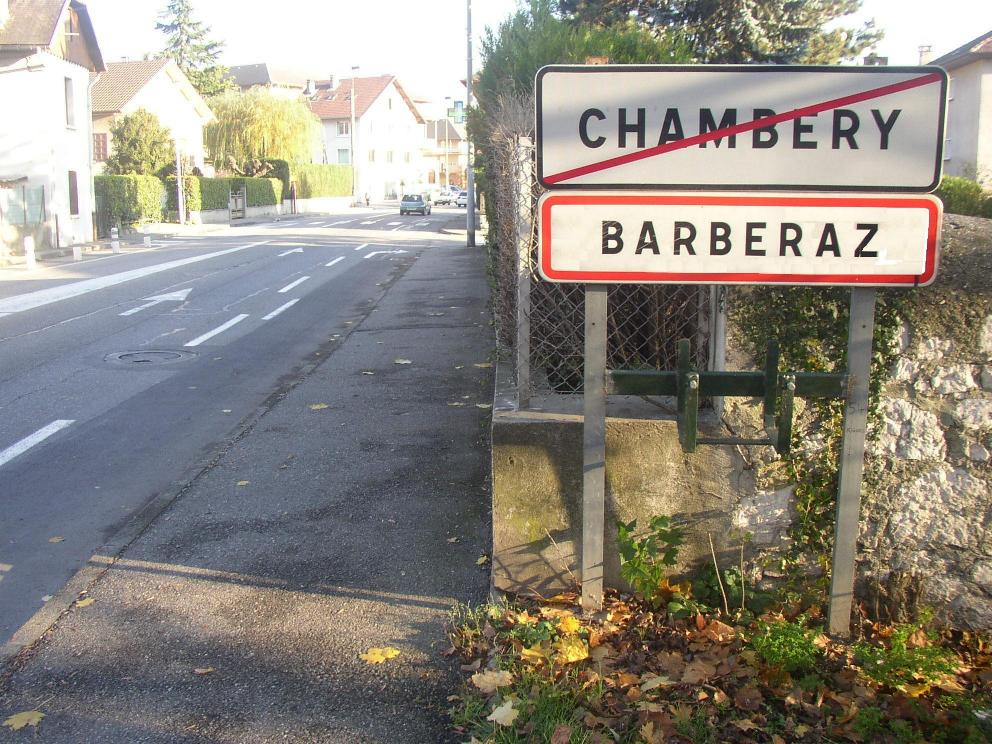
The border between the French communes of Chambéry and Barberaz

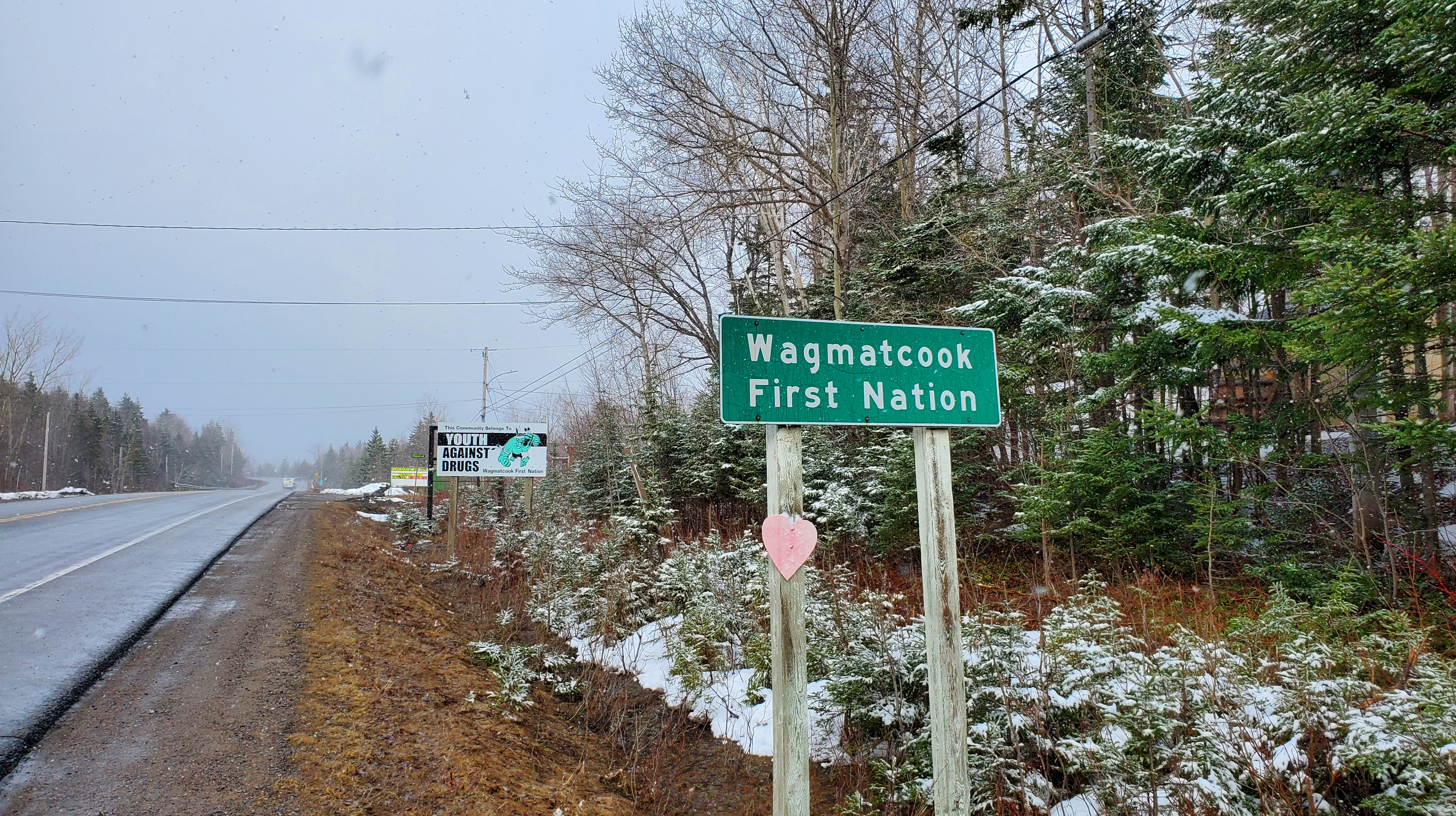
Mi'kmaq community of Wagmatcook in Nova Scotia, Canada

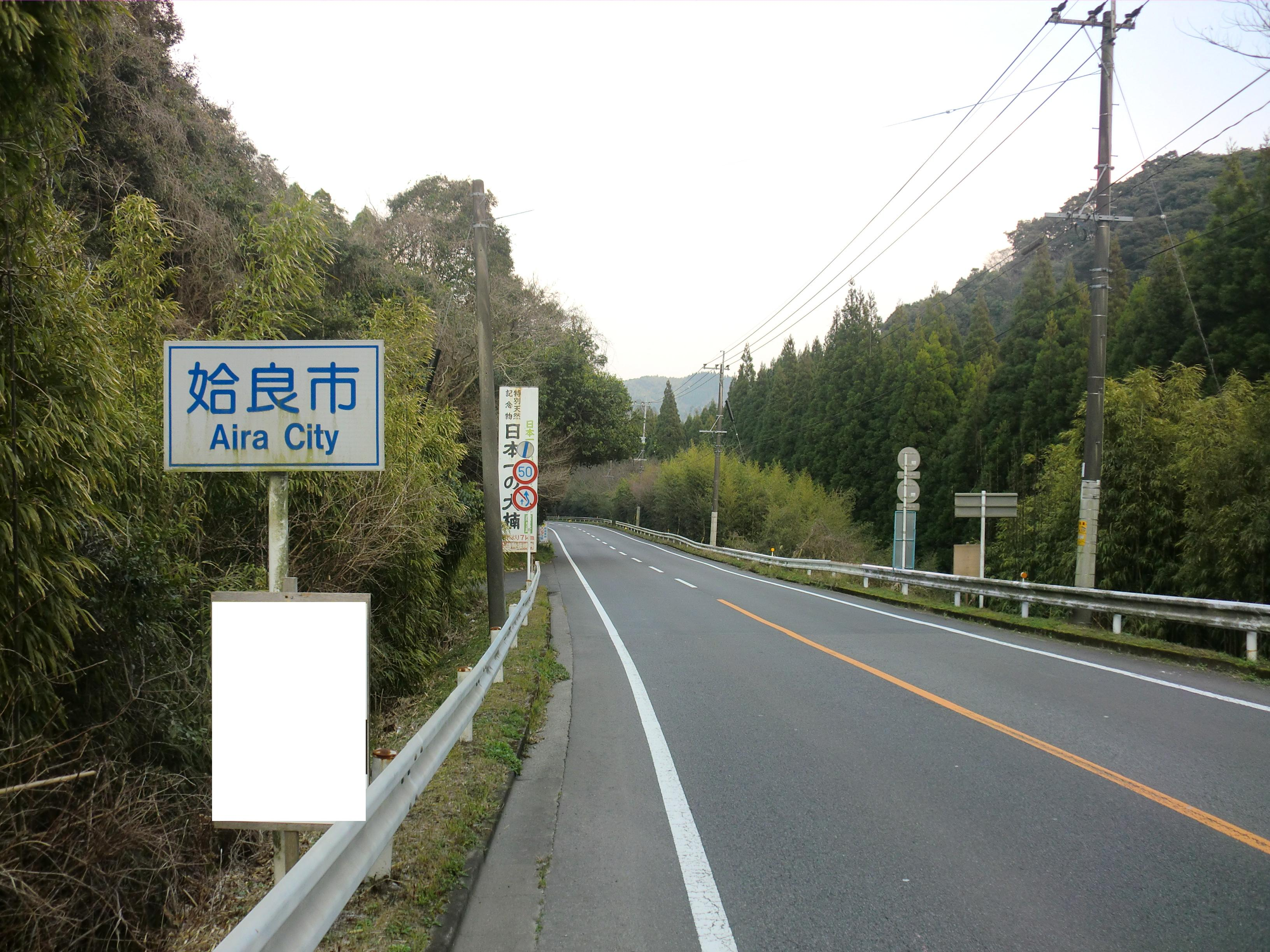
Sign in Japan

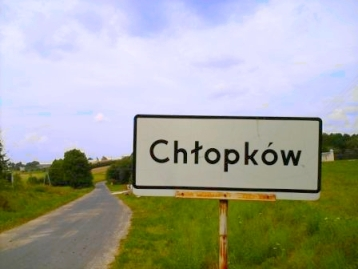
Entry sign, Chłopków, Poland

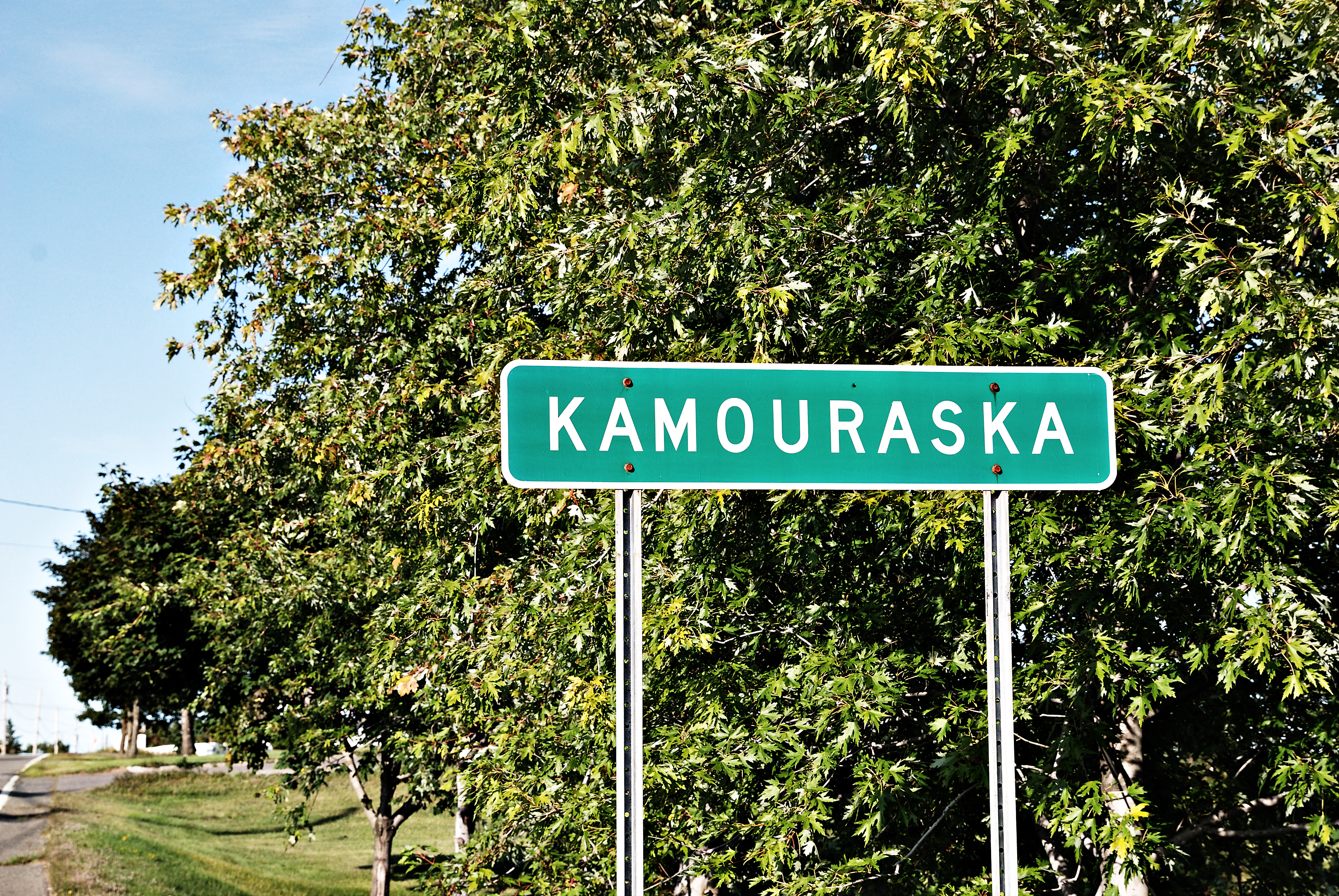
Sign in the Canadian province of Québec

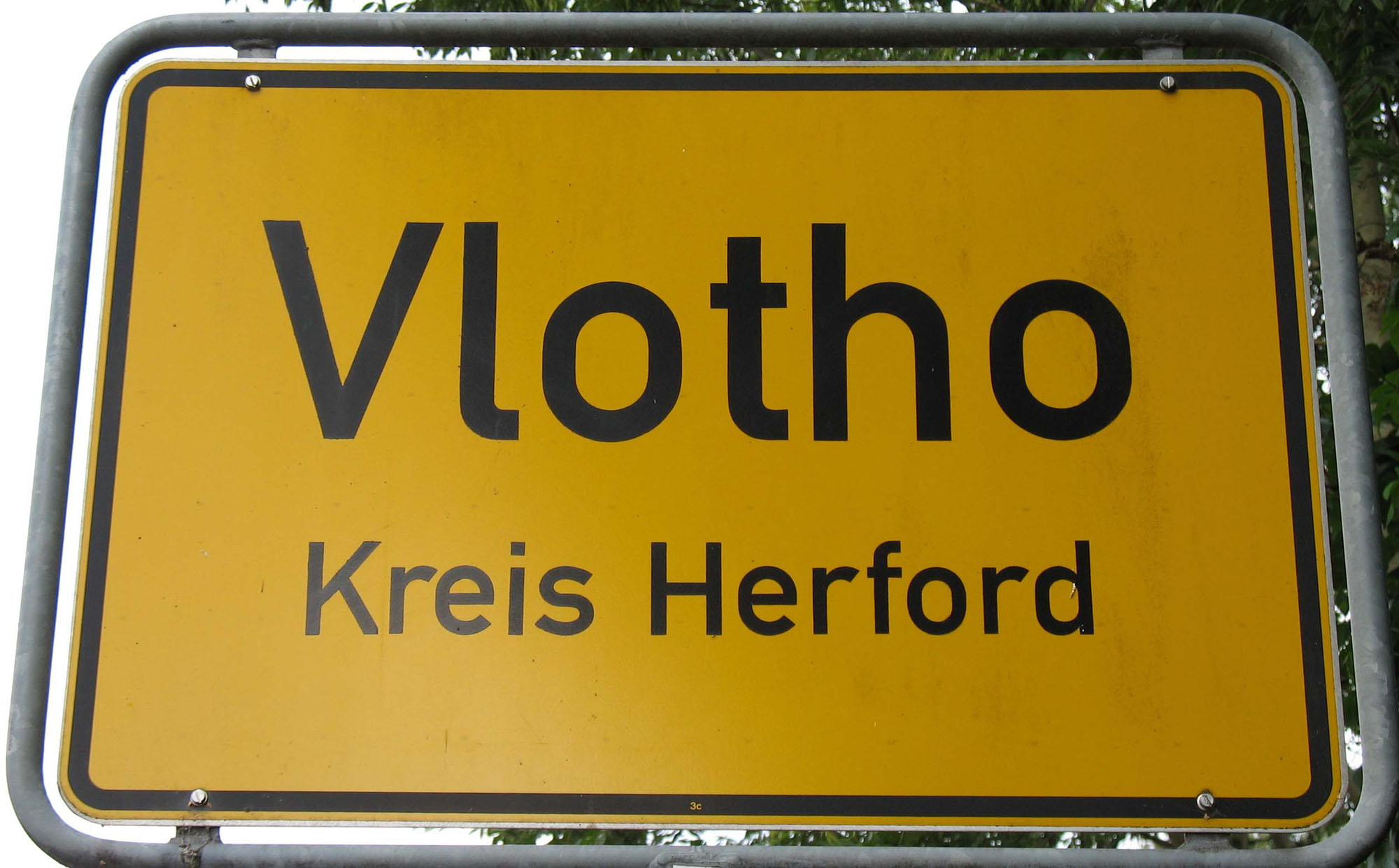
Vlotho in the district of Herford, Germany

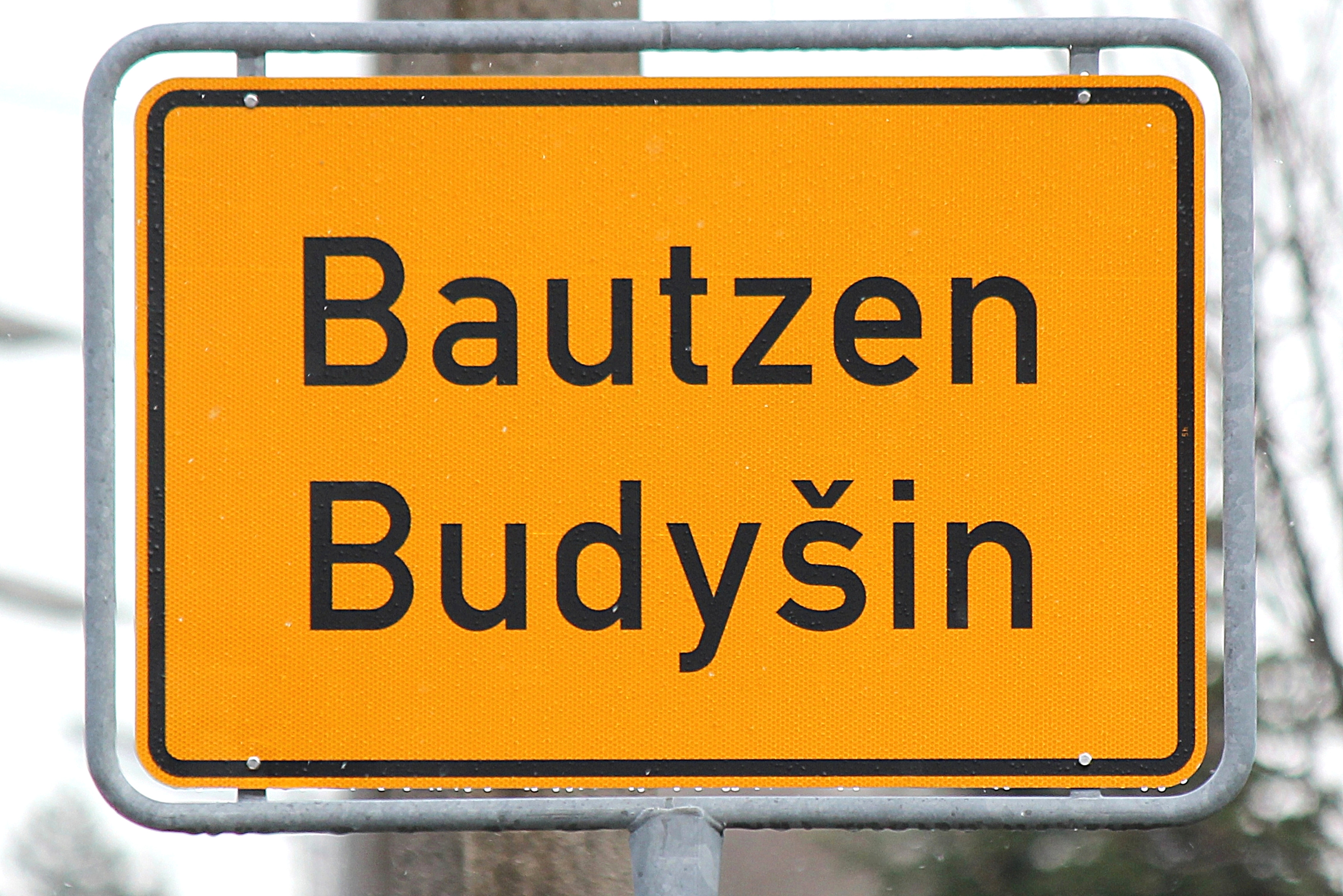
Bilingual entry signs in German and Upper Sorbian in Upper Lusatia, Germany

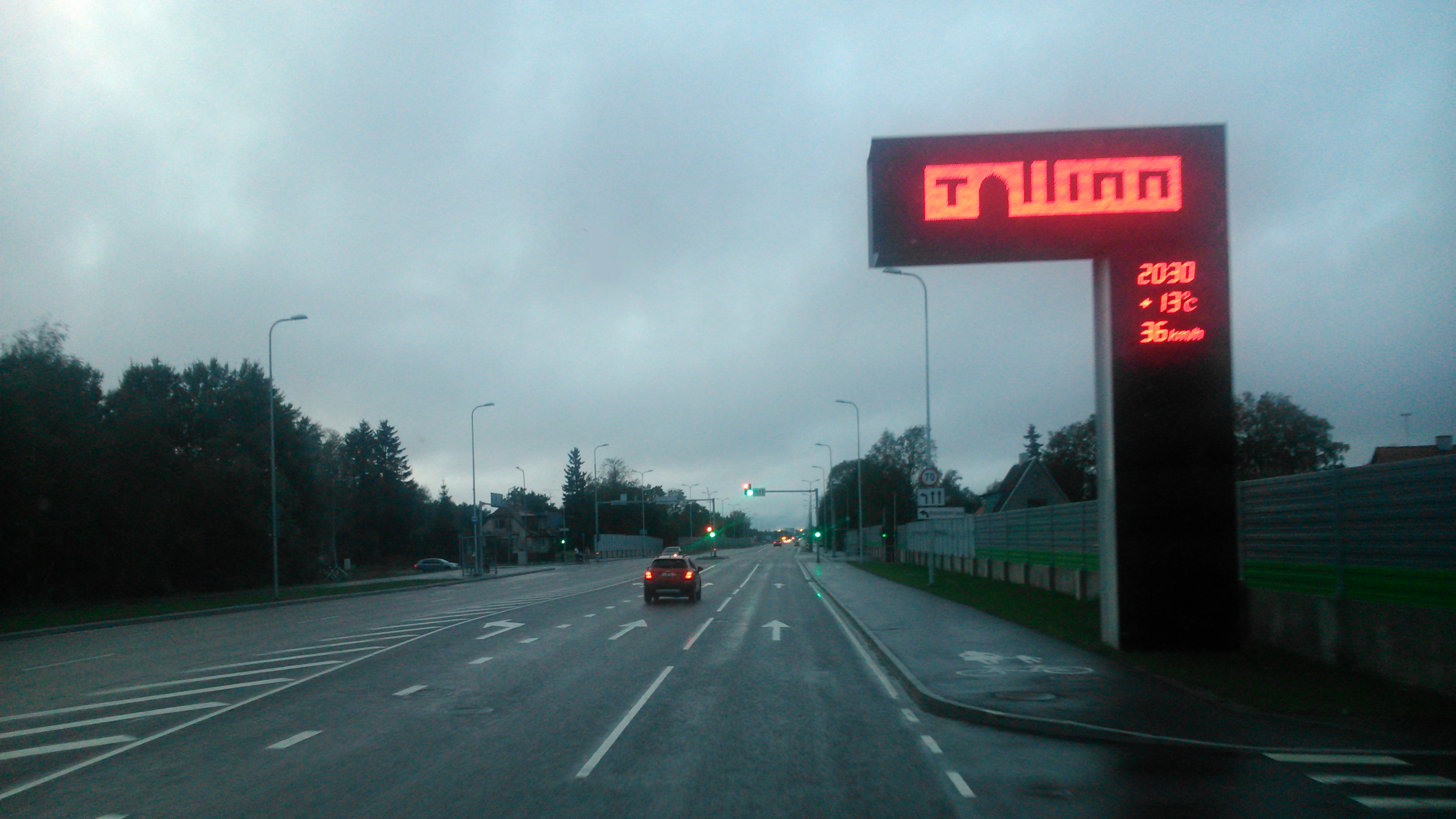
Entrance to Tallinn along the highway 2 (E263) in Estonia

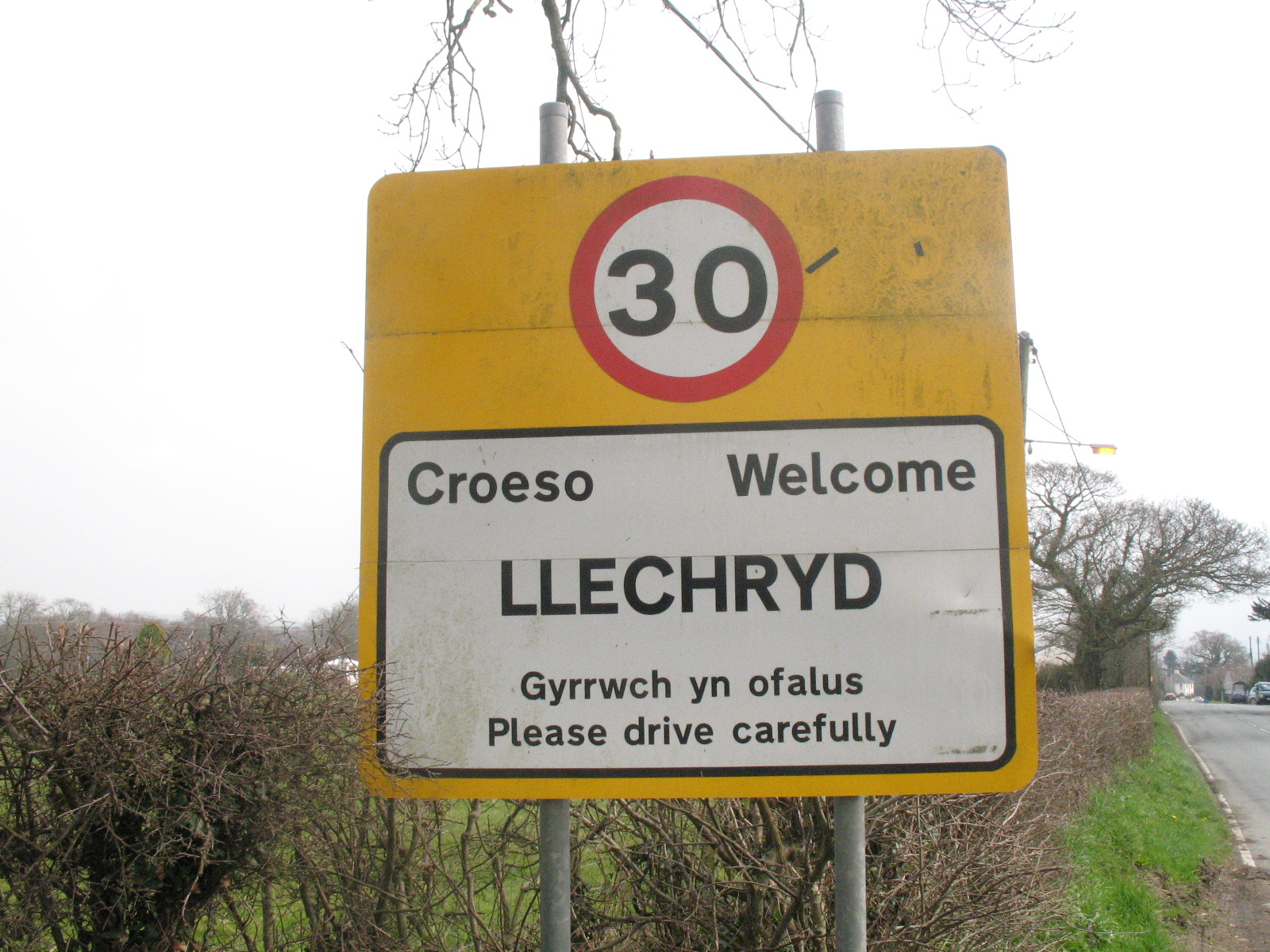
Bilingual English-Welsh sign with speed limit, Llechryd

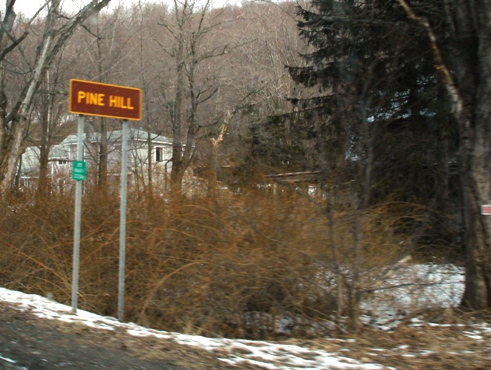
One of Catskill Park's brown and yellow town signs, showing the hamlet of Pine Hill, New York, United States

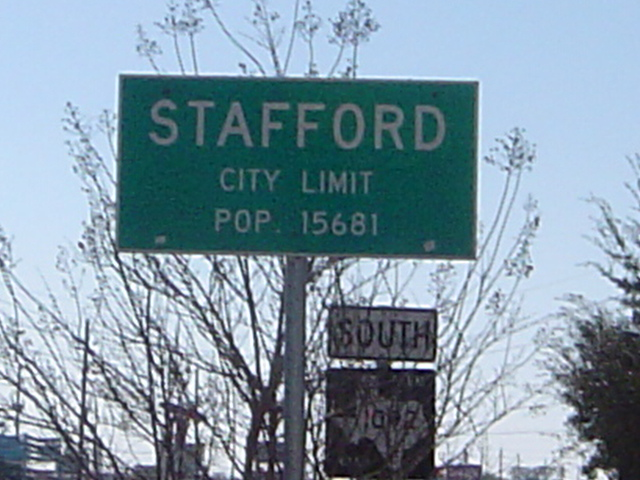
Entry sign for Stafford, Texas on FM 1092

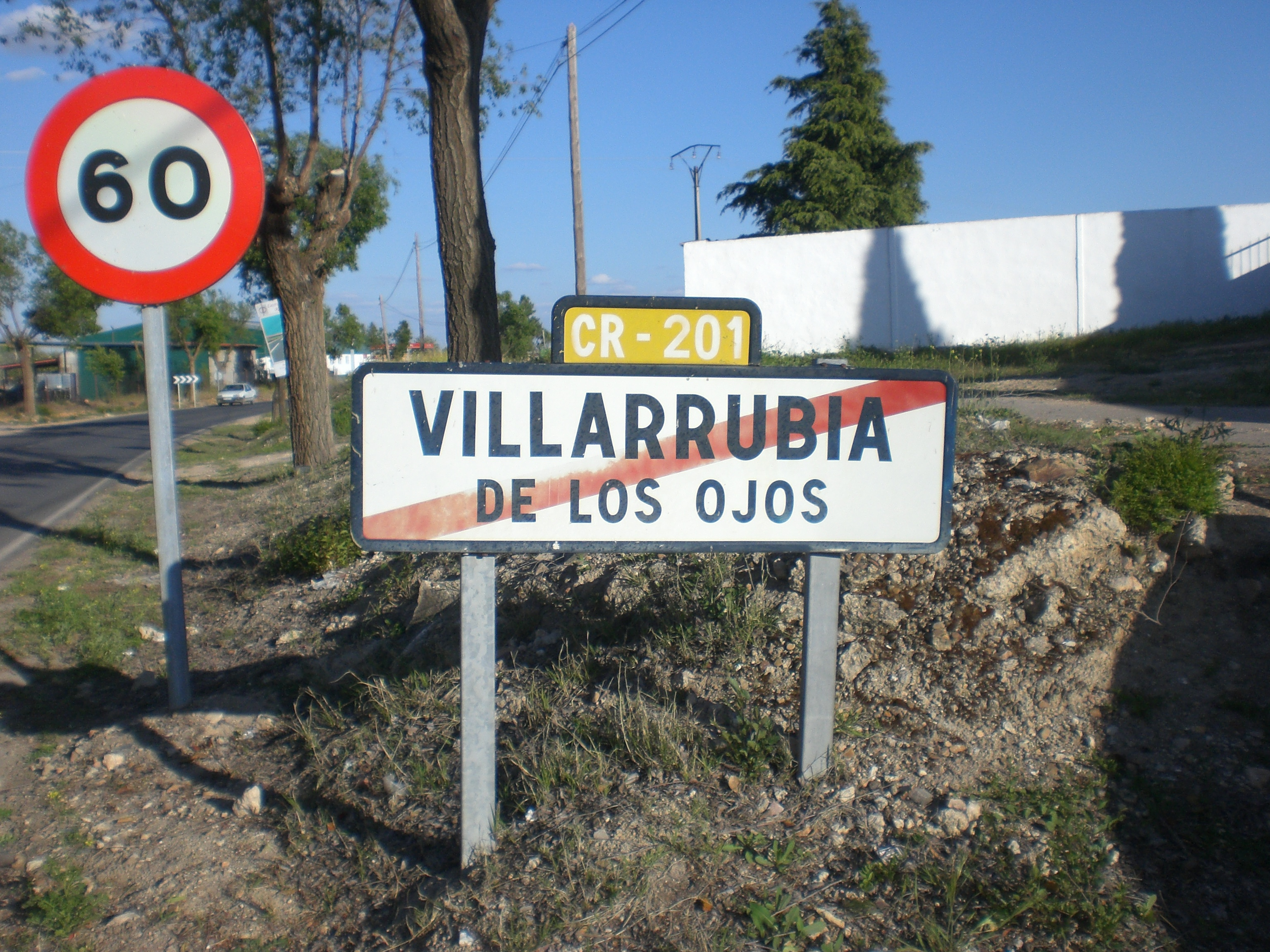
Town exit sign in Villarrubia de los Ojos, Ciudad Real, with a reassurance marker

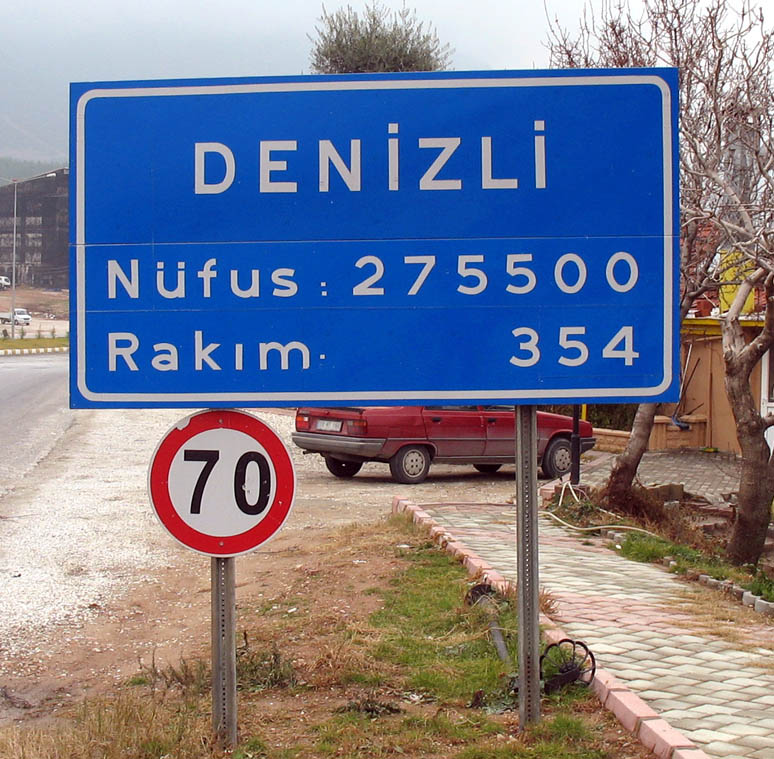
Sign in Turkey

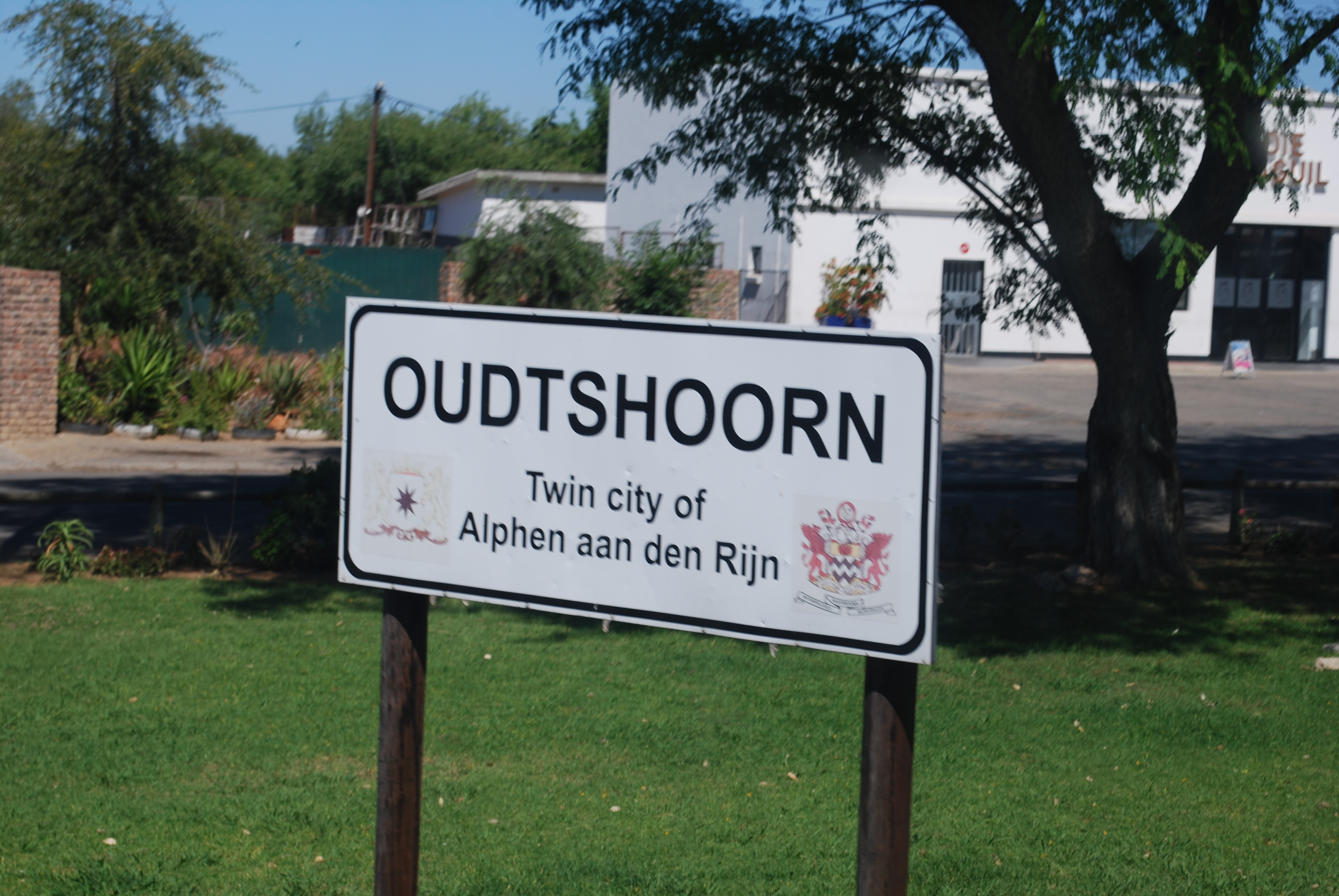
Sign in South Africa

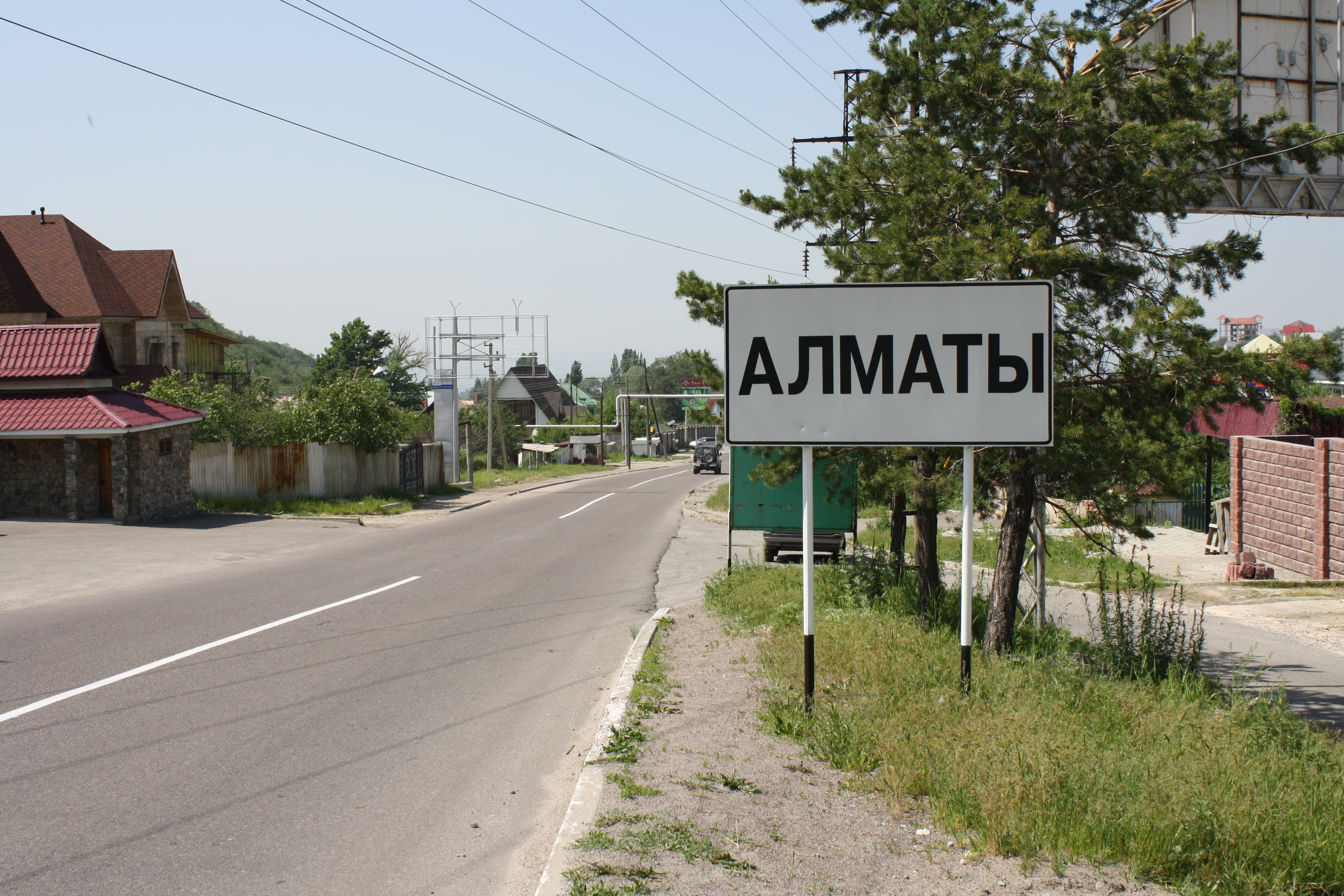
Sign in Kazakhstan

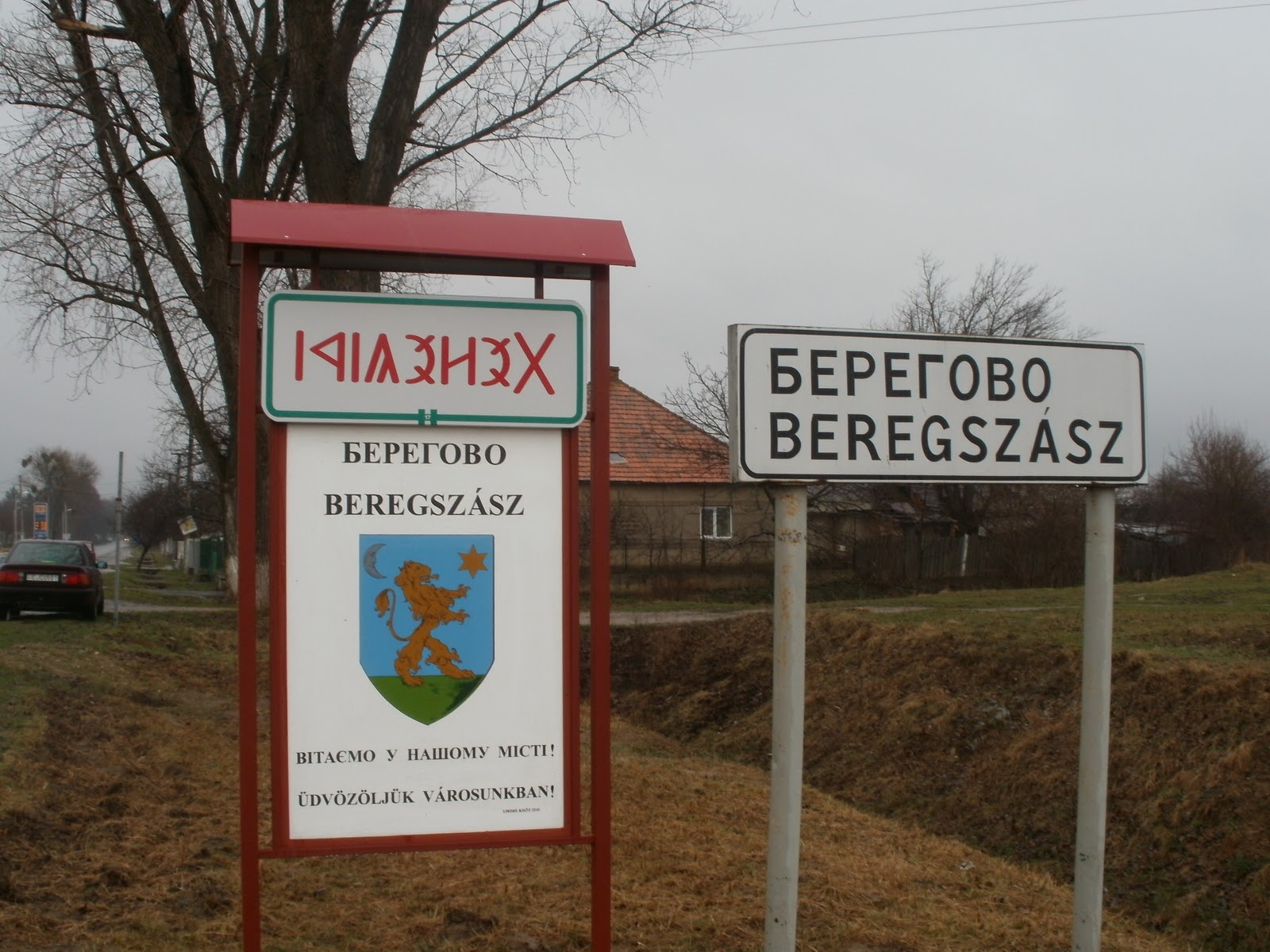
Bilingual entry signs in Beregszász / Berehove / Берегово (Ukraine) - with Cyrillic letters (for Ukrainian), Hungarian letters (for Hungarians) and rovas letters (for 12th-century Magyars)

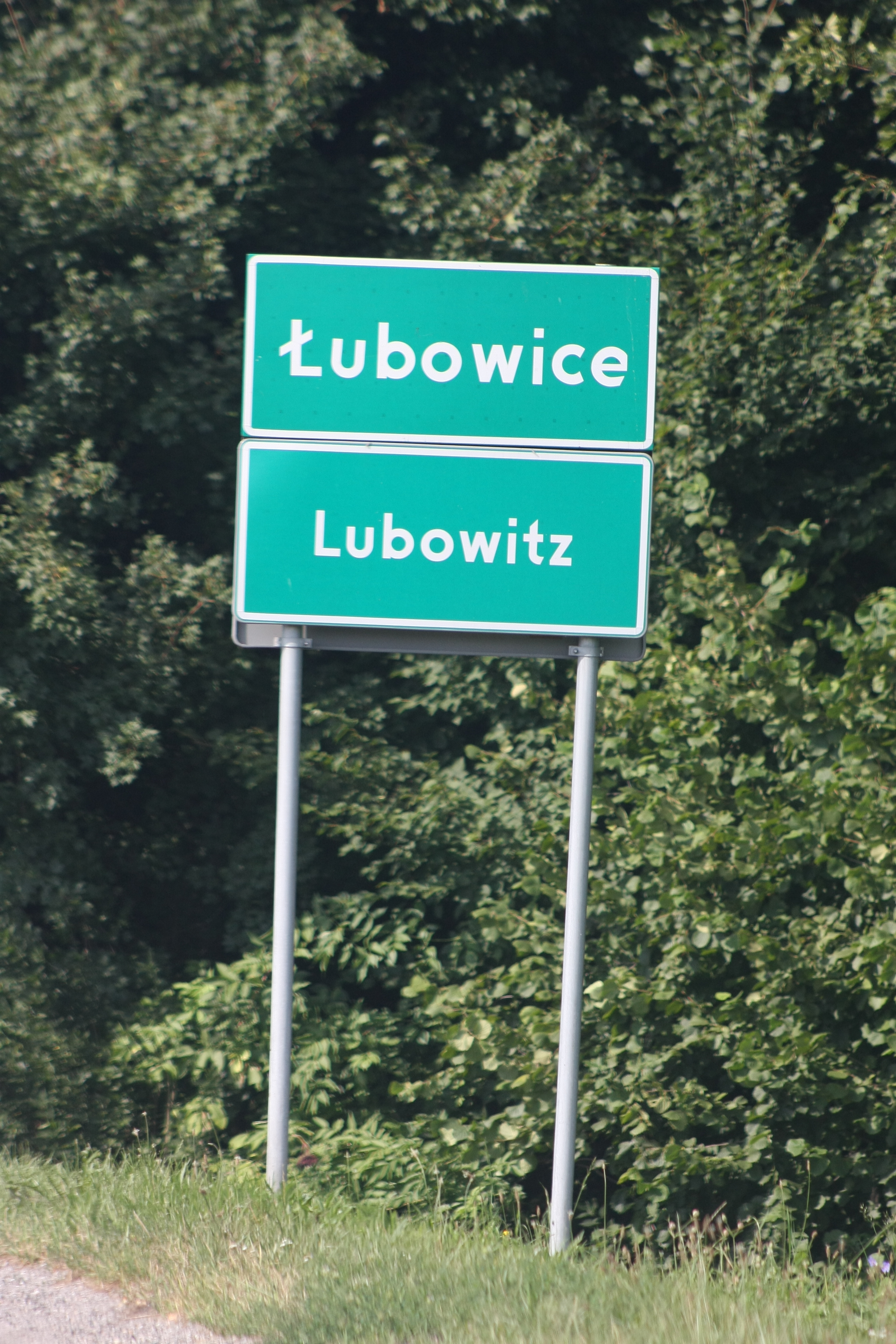
Bilingual entry sign in Polish and German in Łubowice, Poland

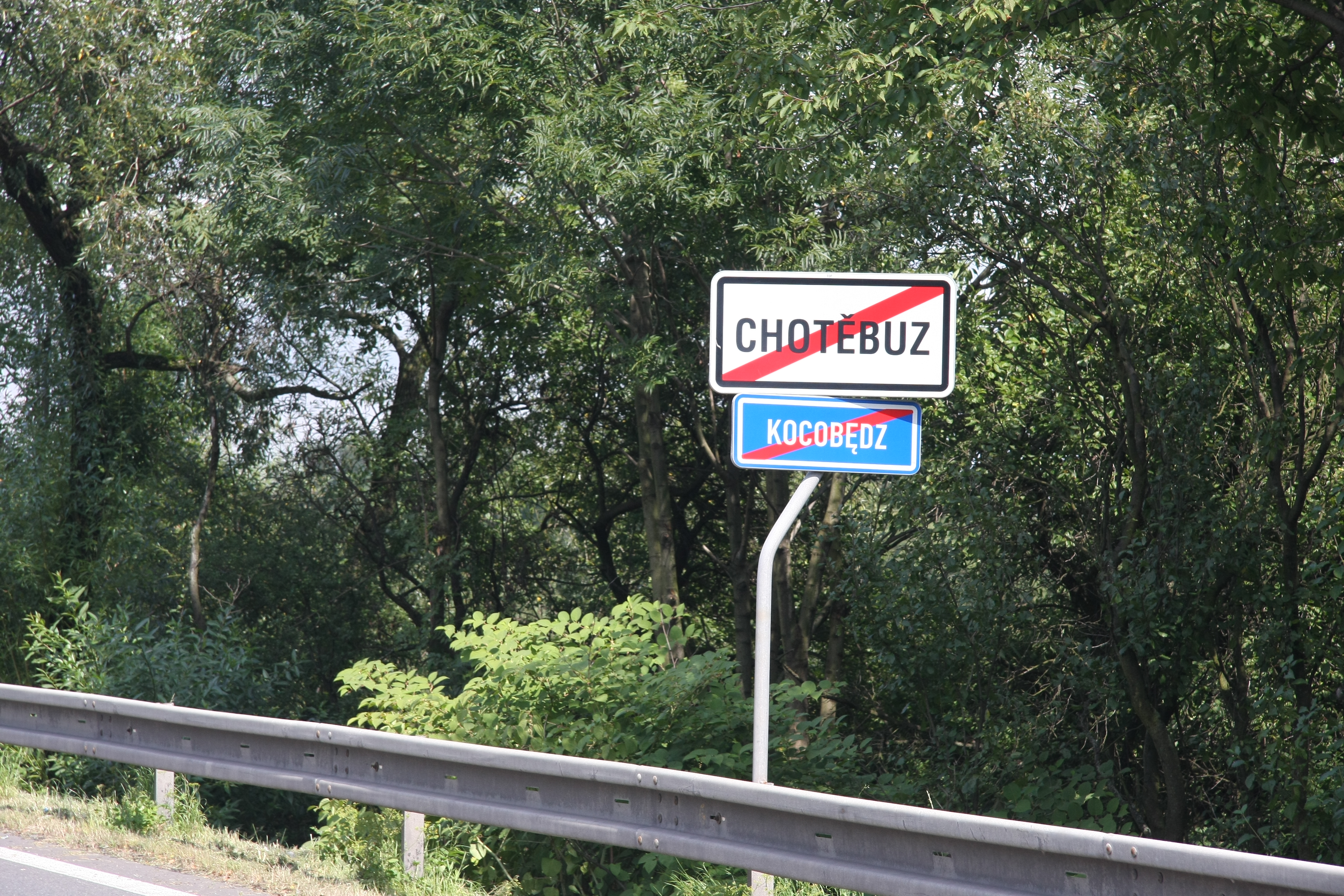
Bilingual exit sign in Czech and Polish in Trans-Olza, Czech Republic

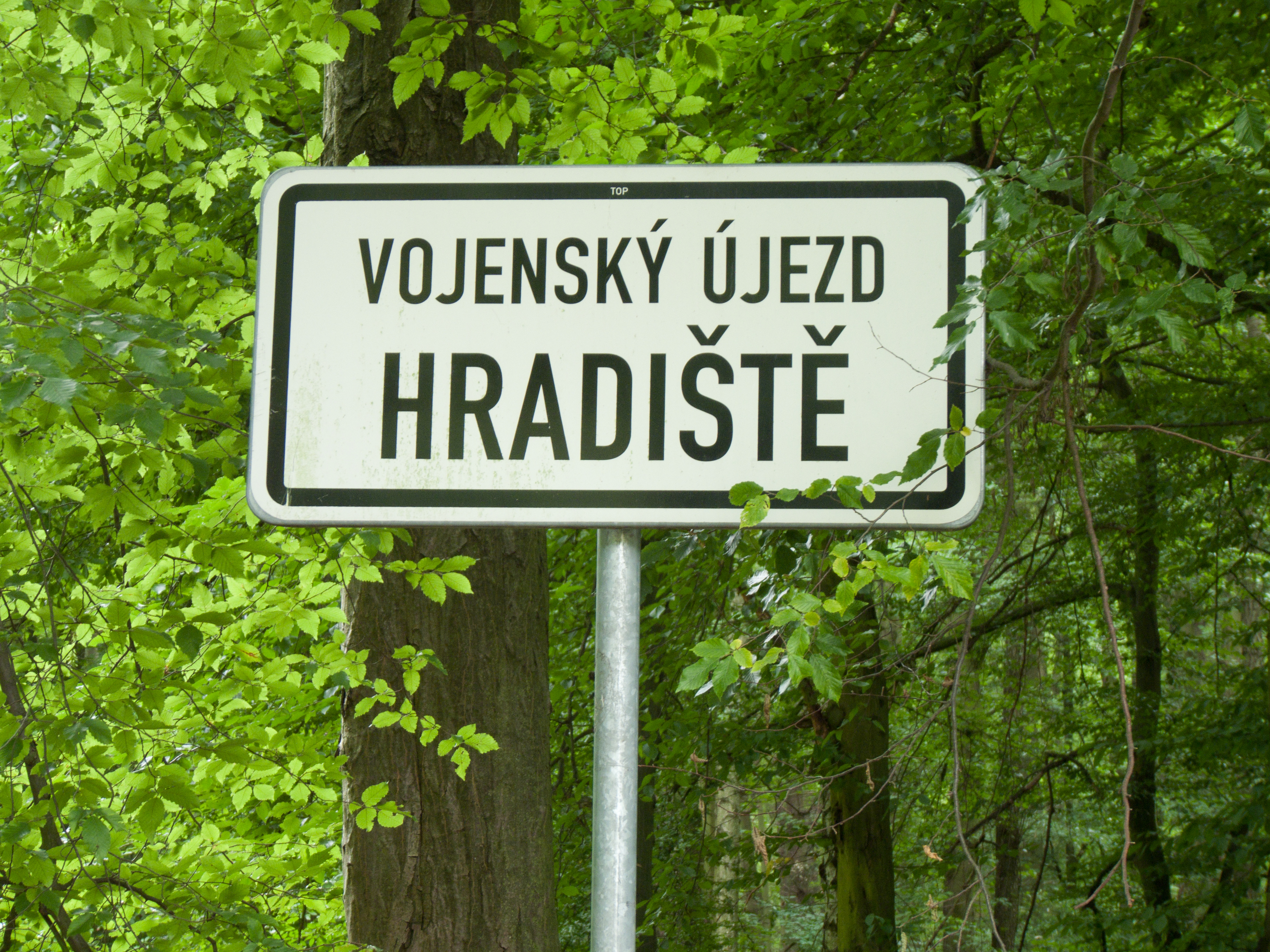
Entry sign in Hradiště Military Training Area, Karlovy Vary Region, Czech Republic

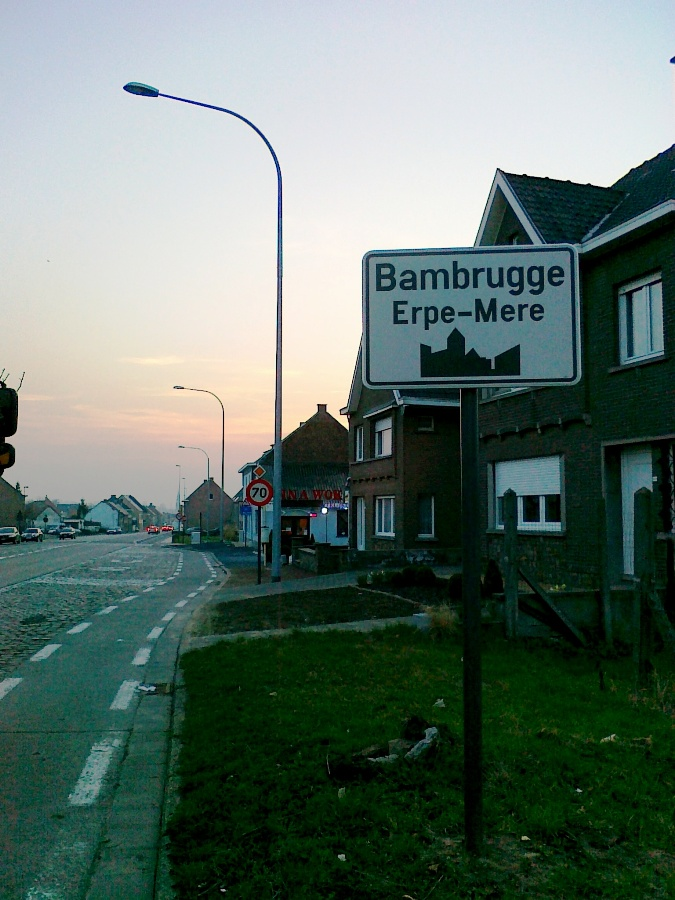
The speed limit of 50 km/h in Bambrugge

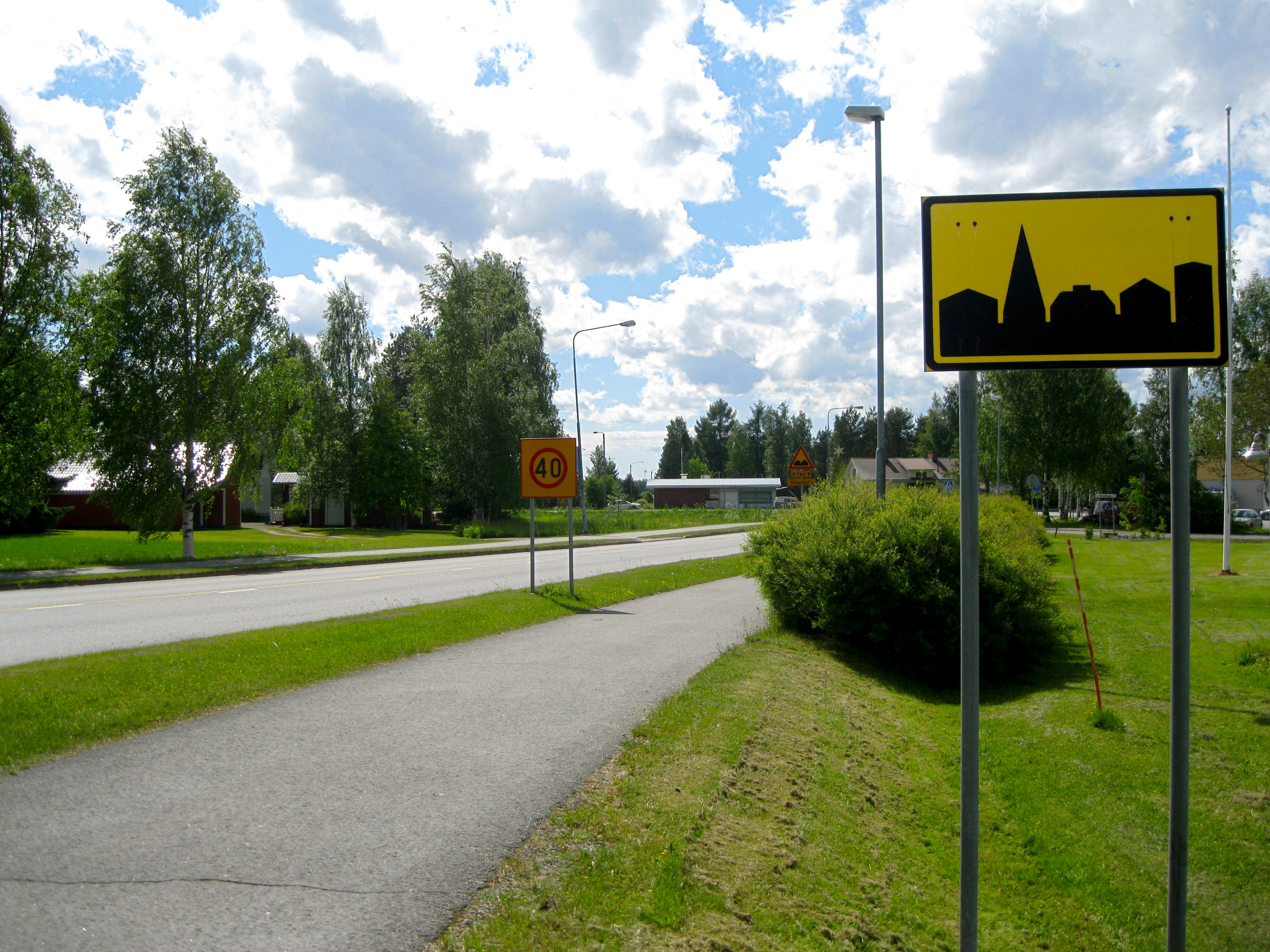
A town area sign (with the speed limit of 40 km/h) in Vimpeli, Finland

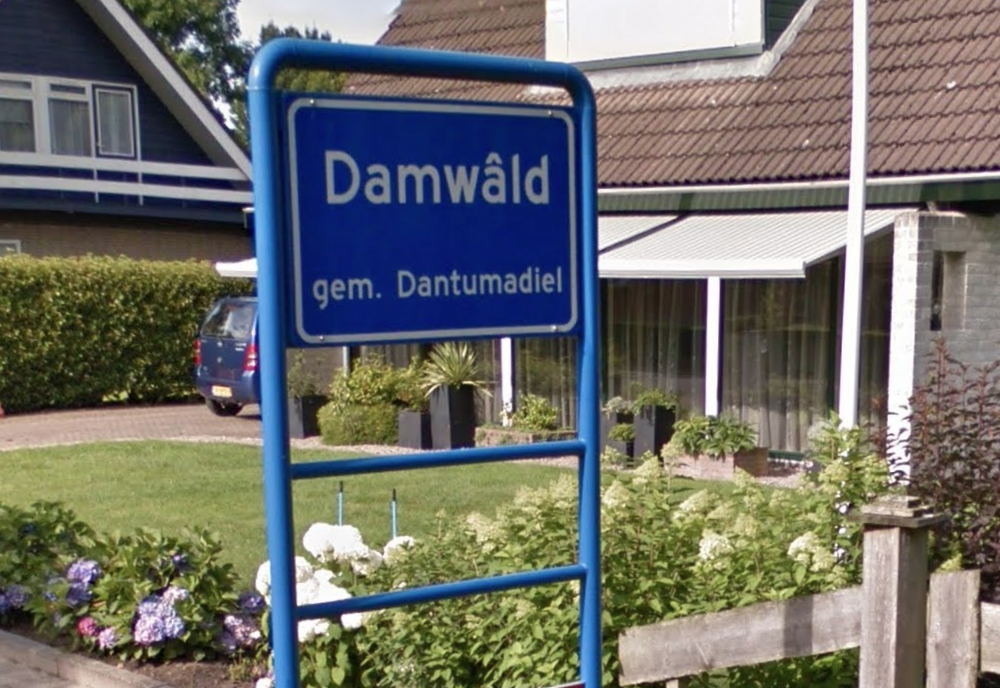
Entry sign in Damwâld, Netherlands
