= Adam Szymański =

Polish writer and lawyer (1852–1916)

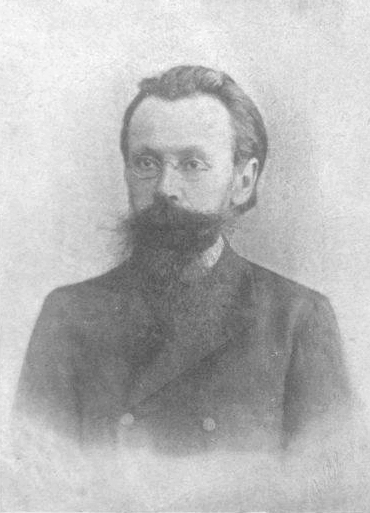

Adam Szymański (15 July 1852 – 6 April 1916) was a Polish writer and lawyer, remembered for his Siberian Sketches, detailed depictions of the life of Poles in exile. Pieces translated into English include "Srul from Lubartów", "A Pinch of Salt", and "Maciej the Mazur".

== Life ==
He was born in Hruszniew. During the years 1872–1877, he attended high school in Siedlce. He studied law at the University of Warsaw in 1877. For his involvement with Adam Stanisław Sapieha's "National Government" of 1877, and for helping Jan Ludwik Popławski to found the "Sons of the Fatherland", a socialist group presented as a patriotic version of Ludwik Waryński's network, he was imprisoned in the Tenth Pavilion of the Warsaw Citadel in the years 1878–1879.

He was exiled to Siberia, where he conducted geographical studies and ethnographic research into the Yakuts. At first he lived in Yakutsk and, from 1882, in Kirensk and Balagansk. After 1885, he was able to move to the European part of Russia beyond the borders of Poland. In the same year he became a member of the Imperial Russian Geographical Society. He returned to Warsaw in 1895 and, from 1902, lived in Kraków. During the years 1904–1913, he edited the magazine "School Reform". He died in Moscow in 1916.

His wife was Nadezhda, with whom he had one son, Jan (1913–1953), who inherited his father's library.

== Works ==
- Srul z Lubartowa ("Srul from Lubartów", short story, 1885) later included in Szkice
- Szkice ("Sketches", short stories, 1887)
- Unter Ansiedlern und Verschickten ("With settlers and deportees", 1894)
- Maciej Mazur: szkic z Syberyi ("Maciej the Mazur", memoirs, 1904)
- Wśród Słoweńców: szkice z życia uspolecznionych pobratymców ("Among the Slovenes", non-fiction, 1907)
- Z jakuckiego Olimpu: baśń ("From the Yakutian Olympia", fairy tale, 1910)
- Aksinja: Opowiadanie z życia moskiewskiej Lechii ("Aksinya", short stories, 1911)
- Lew Tołstoj: Istota jego działalności ("Leo Tolstoy", pamphlet, 1911)

== Bibliography ==
- Hanna Maria Małgowska: Adam Szymański a rosyjscy epicy wygnania: analogie i różnice. Olsztyn: Wyższa Szkoła Pedagogiczna w Olsztynie, 1989.
- Bogdan Burdziej: Inny świat ludzkiej nadziei: "Szkice" Adama Szymańskiego na tle literatury zsyłkowej. 1991.
- Joanna Arvaniti: "Adam Szymański" in Polscy badacze Syberii. Warsaw: Archiwum Polskiej Akademii Nauk, 2008, pp. 40–41. OCLC 316444042 ISBN 978-83-922103-8-2.
