= Czuchów, Masovian Voivodeship =

Czuchów
- Village
- Location within Poland
- Coordinates: 52°17′N 22°48′E
- Country: Poland
- Voivodeship: Masovian
- County: Łosice
- Gmina: Platerów

Czuchów [ˈt͡ʂuxuf] is a village in the administrative district of Gmina Platerów, within Łosice County, Masovian Voivodeship, in east-central Poland.
