= Platerów =

- Village
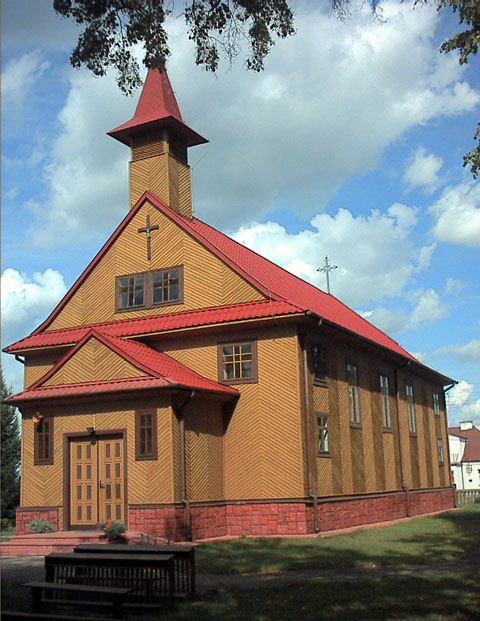
- Exaltation of the Holly Cross church

- Coat of arms

- Location within Poland
- Coordinates: 52°18′N 22°49′E
- Country: Poland
- Voivodeship: Masovian
- County: Łosice
- Gmina: Platerów
- Population: 812

Platerów [plaˈtɛruf] is a village in Łosice County, Masovian Voivodeship, in east-central Poland. It is the seat of the gmina (administrative district) called Gmina Platerów.
