= Hruszniew-Kolonia =

- Village
- Location within Poland
- Coordinates: 52°14′16″N 22°49′55″E
- Country: Poland
- Voivodeship: Masovian
- County: Łosice
- Gmina: Platerów

Hruszniew-Kolonia [ˈxruʂɲɛf kɔˈlɔɲa] is a village in the administrative district of Gmina Platerów, within Łosice County, Masovian Voivodeship, in east-central Poland.
