= Myszkowice, Masovian Voivodeship =

Myszkowice
- Village
- Location within Poland
- Coordinates: 52°17′6″N 22°44′22″E
- Country: Poland
- Voivodeship: Masovian
- County: Łosice
- Gmina: Platerów

Myszkowice [mɨʂkɔˈvit͡sɛ] is a village in the administrative district of Gmina Platerów, within Łosice County, Masovian Voivodeship, in east-central Poland.
