= Nowodomki =

- Village
- Location within Poland
- Coordinates: 52°18′29″N 22°48′47″E
- Country: Poland
- Voivodeship: Masovian
- County: Łosice
- Gmina: Platerów

Nowodomki [nɔvɔˈdɔmki] is a village in the administrative district of Gmina Platerów, within Łosice County, Masovian Voivodeship, in east-central Poland.
