= Mężenin-Kolonia =

Village in Gmina Platerów, Poland

- Village
- Location within Poland
- Coordinates: 52°21′51″N 22°45′51″E
- Country: Poland
- Voivodeship: Masovian
- County: Łosice
- Gmina: Platerów
- Population: 154

Mężenin-Kolonia [mɛ̃ˈʐɛnin kɔˈlɔɲa] is a village in the administrative district of Gmina Platerów, within Łosice County, Masovian Voivodeship, in east-central Poland.
