= Michałów, Łosice County =

Michałów
- Village
- Location within Poland
- Coordinates: 52°21′N 22°47′E
- Country: Poland
- Voivodeship: Masovian
- County: Łosice
- Gmina: Platerów

Michałów [miˈxawuf] is a village in the administrative district of Gmina Platerów, within Łosice County, Masovian Voivodeship, in east-central Poland.
