= Zaborze, Łosice County =

Zaborze
- Village
- Location within Poland
- Coordinates: 52°17′8″N 22°45′14″E
- Country: Poland
- Voivodeship: Masovian
- County: Łosice
- Gmina: Platerów

Zaborze [zaˈbɔʐɛ] is a village in the administrative district of Gmina Platerów, within Łosice County, Masovian Voivodeship, in east-central Poland.
