= Mężenin, Masovian Voivodeship =

Mężenin
- Village
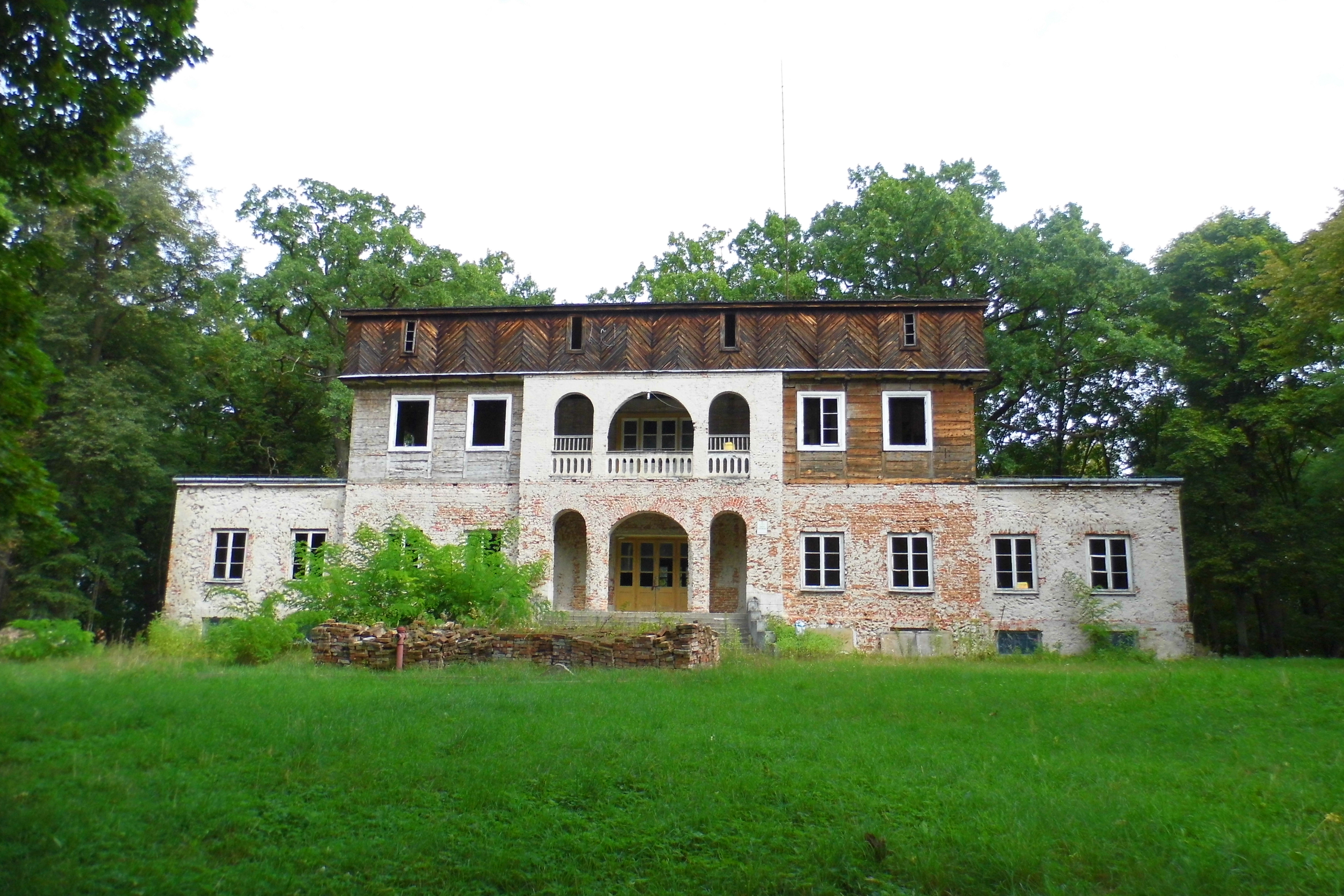

- Location within Poland
- Coordinates: 52°22′10″N 22°46′57″E
- Country: Poland
- Voivodeship: Masovian
- County: Łosice
- Gmina: Platerów

Population
  - Total: 228

Mężenin [mɛ̃ˈʐɛnin] is a village in the administrative district of Gmina Platerów, within Łosice County, Masovian Voivodeship, in east-central Poland.
