= Czuchów-Pieńki =

- Village
- Location within Poland
- Coordinates: 52°17′N 22°46′E
- Country: Poland
- Voivodeship: Masovian
- County: Łosice
- Gmina: Platerów

Czuchów-Pieńki [ˈt͡ʂuxuf ˈpjɛɲki] is a village in the administrative district of Gmina Platerów, within Łosice County, Masovian Voivodeship, in east-central Poland.
