= Gmina Platerów =

Gmina Platerów Platerów Commune
- Gmina
- Coat of arms
- Interactive map of Gmina Platerów
- Coordinates (Platerów): 52°18′N 22°49′E
- Country: Poland
- Voivodeship: Masovian
- County: Łosice
- Seat: Platerów

Area
  - Total: 128.97 km^{2} (49.80 sq mi)

Population (2014)
  - Total: 5,035
  - Density: 39.04/km^{2} (101.1/sq mi)
- Website: http://www.platerow.ug.gov.pl

Gmina Platerów is a rural gmina (administrative district) in Łosice County, Masovian Voivodeship, in east-central Poland. Its seat is the village of Platerów, which lies approximately 12 kilometres (7 mi) north-east of Łosice and 125 km (78 mi) east of Warsaw.

The gmina covers an area of 128.97 square kilometres (49.8 sq mi), and as of 2006 its total population is 5,163 (5,035 in 2014).

The gmina contains part of the protected area called Podlasie Bug Gorge Landscape Park.

== Villages ==
Gmina Platerów contains the villages and settlements of Chłopków, Chłopków-Kolonia, Czuchów, Czuchów-Pieńki, Falatycze, Górki, Hruszew, Hruszniew, Hruszniew-Kolonia, Kamianka, Kisielew, Lipno, Mężenin, Mężenin-Kolonia, Michałów, Myszkowice, Nowodomki, Ostromęczyn, Ostromęczyn-Kolonia, Platerów, Puczyce, Rusków and Zaborze.

== Neighbouring gminas ==
Gmina Platerów is bordered by the gminas of Drohiczyn, Korczew, Łosice, Przesmyki, Sarnaki, Siemiatycze and Stara Kornica.
