= Ostromęczyn-Kolonia =

Village in Gmina Platerów, Poland

- Village
- Location within Poland
- Coordinates: 52°16′35″N 22°49′36″E
- Country: Poland
- Voivodeship: Masovian
- County: Łosice
- Gmina: Platerów

Ostromęczyn-Kolonia [ɔstrɔˈmɛnt͡ʂɨn kɔˈlɔɲa] is a village in the administrative district of Gmina Platerów, within Łosice County, Masovian Voivodeship, in east-central Poland.
