= Kisielew =

- Village
- Location within Poland
- Coordinates: 52°19′N 22°48′E
- Country: Poland
- Voivodeship: Masovian
- County: Łosice
- Gmina: Platerów
- Website: http://www.kisielew.pl

Kisielew [kiˈɕɛlɛf] is a village in the administrative district of Gmina Platerów, within Łosice County, Masovian Voivodeship, in east-central Poland.
