= Chłopków, Masovian Voivodeship =

Chłopków
- Village
- Location within Poland
- Coordinates: 52°15′57″N 22°51′57″E
- Country: Poland
- Voivodeship: Masovian
- County: Łosice
- Gmina: Platerów
- Population (approx.): 270

Chłopków [ˈxwɔpkuf] is a village in the administrative district of Gmina Platerów, within Łosice County, Masovian Voivodeship, in east-central Poland.
