= Hruszniew =

- Village
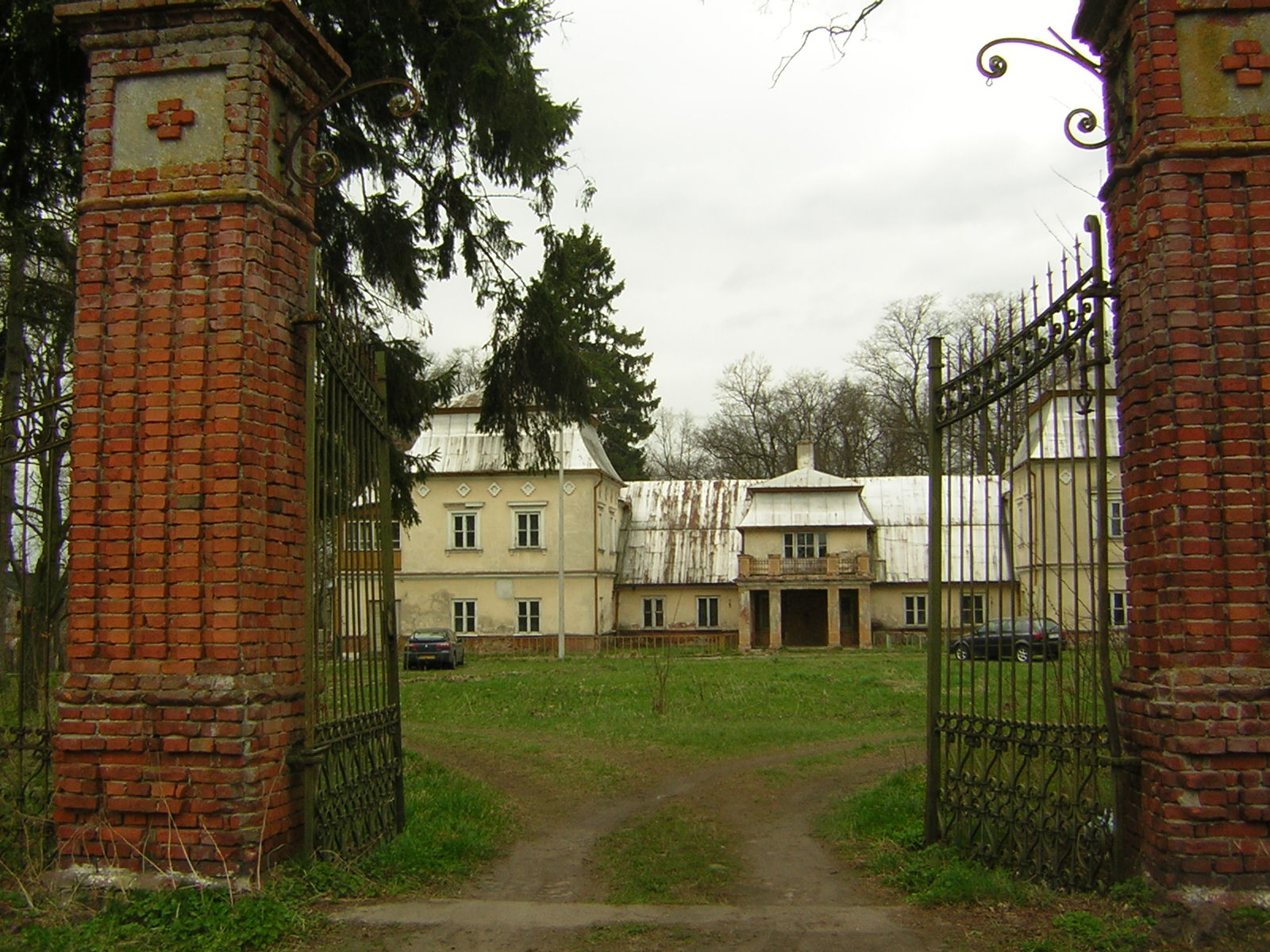
- Manor in Hruszniew

- Location within Poland
- Coordinates: 52°15′N 22°51′E
- Country: Poland
- Voivodeship: Masovian
- County: Łosice
- Gmina: Platerów

Hruszniew [ˈxruʂɲɛf] is a village in the administrative district of Gmina Platerów, within Łosice County, Masovian Voivodeship, in east-central Poland.
