= 1410 in Poland =

Events of the year 1410 in Poland.

== Incumbents ==
- Monarch: Władysław II Jagiełło

== Events ==
Polish-Lithuanian-Teutonic War:

- 9 July: The Polish-Lithuanian army enters the territory of the Teutonic order

- 12 July: Emperor Sigismund of Luxemburg declares war on Poland; Działdowo conquered by the allied army

- 13 July: Dąbrówno (with its important Teutonic fortress) is conquered; the Teutonic order moves its army towards the village of Grunwald

- 15 July: Battle of Grunwald: In one of the biggest battle of the Middle Ages the Polish-Lithuanian army defeats the Teutonic order; One of the battle's victims is the order's Grand master Ulrich von Jungingen

- 25 July: Beginning of the unsuccessful Siege of Malbork, quasi capital of the Teutonic state, to which the entire order fled after the lost battle

- 7 August: The town of Toruń is handed over to king Jagiełło after a three-week siege

- 31 August: The town of Grudziądz with its important Teutonic fortress is conquered by the Polish army

- 19 September: Jagiełło withdraws from Malbork

- September: The army of Sigismund of Luxemburg invades Poland

- 29 September: Jagiełło passes through Toruń

- 31 October: Grudziądz reconquered by the Teutonic order; the same happens to the other fortresses won earlier by the Polish army

== Deaths ==
- Matthew of Cracov; Polish bishop and religious writer
