= Our Grunwald Festival =

Medieval festival

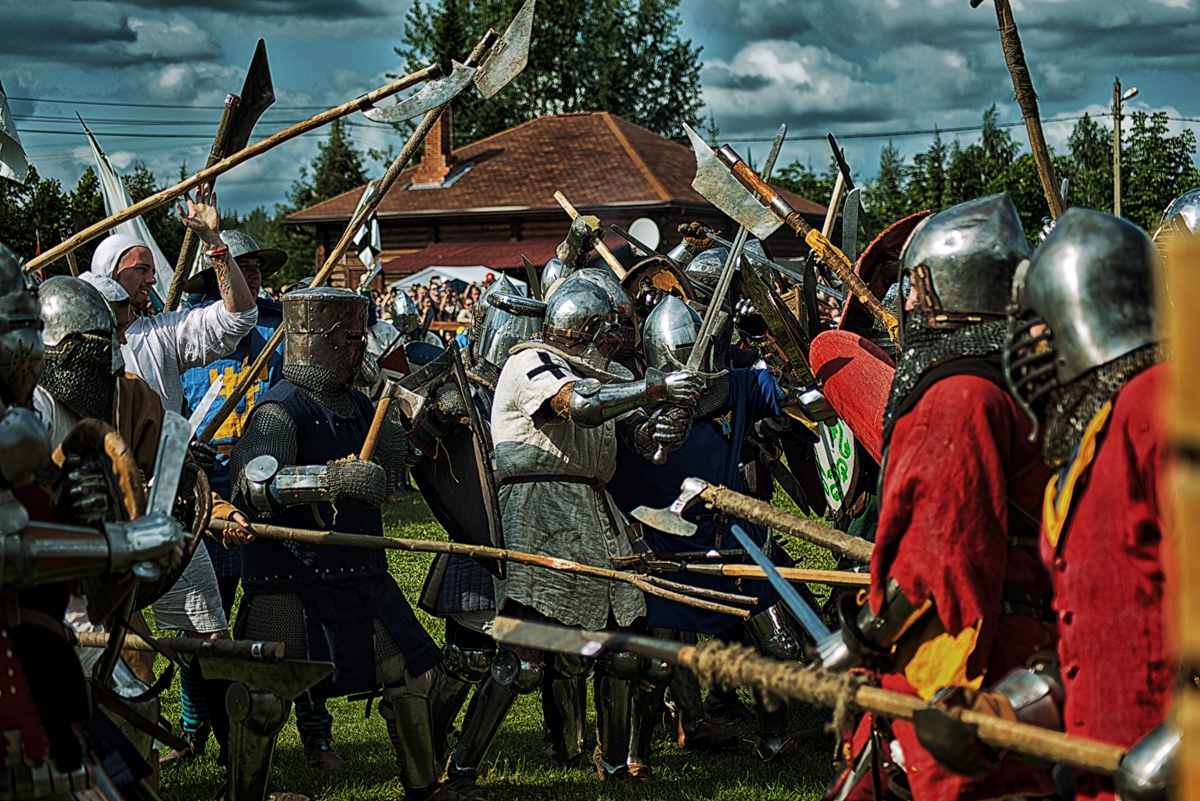
- Genre: Historical/medieval festival
- Date(s): July
- Frequency: Yearly
- Venue: Dudutki Museum of Ancient Crafts and Technologies
- Country: Belarus
- Established: 2008
- Founders: Alexander Rak, Andrei Zakharenko
- Participants: 500
- Attendance: 8,000 (2019)
- Website: http://nashgrunwald.by/

Our Grunwald (Belarusian: Наш Грунвальд, Russian: Наш Грюнвальд) is an annual festival of medieval culture and music held by the Dudutki Museum of Ancient Crafts and Technologies in Belarus. It celebrates the military and secular culture and traditions of Belarus. It is dedicated to the reconstruction of the Battle of Grunwald between the forces of the Teutonic Order and allies the Grand Duchy of Lithuania (including modern Belarus) and the Kingdom of Poland.

The festival has been taking place since 2008 and brings together the country's best knight clubs in Minsk, who then take part in the theatrical reconstruction of the battle. In addition, the festival features medieval tournaments, performances by folk, rock, and metal bands, medieval food, crafts, and costumes.

Among the festival's organizers are the Berserk Extreme Theater and Alexander Rak. On average, about 500 representatives of the military-historical reenactment clubs from Belarus, Russia and other European countries take part in the festival.

== Festival details ==
Our Grunwald combines three festivals in one: a military-historical re-enactment, a music festival and a festival of medieval costume.

The time frame that has to be respected for the re-enactment, is 1170 - 1520. The festival reconstructs the corresponding time period for large parts of Western Europe, the Grand Duchy of Lithuania, the Kingdom of Poland and the Baltics, and each participant is judged by a special commission to see if they comply with the era. For example, they have to send a photograph of the costumes to the commission.

During two festival days, there are knightly tournaments on foot, battles between archers, halberdiers and spearmen, full-contact mass battles (buhurts), a "Battle of the Yards" tournament, equestrian tournaments and fight demonstrations. The central event is the reconstruction of the Battle of Grunwald, that took place on July 15, 1410, at the Prussian town of Grunwald (modern territory of Poland).

Our Grunwald is the largest festival in Belarus by the number of participants/re-enactors. In 2019, about 8,000 people attended the festival. In 2015, a so-called “festival within the festival” was added to "Our Grunwald": a large-scale open-air concert, called “Feast after the Battle”, in which famous folk and rock bands of Belarus and foreign countries take part. It's been held annually ever since.
