= Ludwigsdorf =

Ludwigsdorf may refer to:

- Ludwigsdorf, Lower Austria
- Ludwigsdorf (Görlitz)
- Ludwikowice Klodzkie, part of the Gross-Rosen concentration camp
- the German name of Łodwigowo in Poland
- the German name of Cârlibaba, in Suceava County, Bukovina, northeastern Romania.
- the German name of Giulești and of Logig in Romania
- the German name of Padina in Vojvodina, Serbia and Montenegro
- a suburb of Windhoek
