= Battle of Grunwald =

1410 battle of the Polish–Lithuanian–Teutonic War

Coordinates: 53°29′10″N 20°07′29″E

- Part of the Polish–Lithuanian–Teutonic War and the Lithuanian Crusade
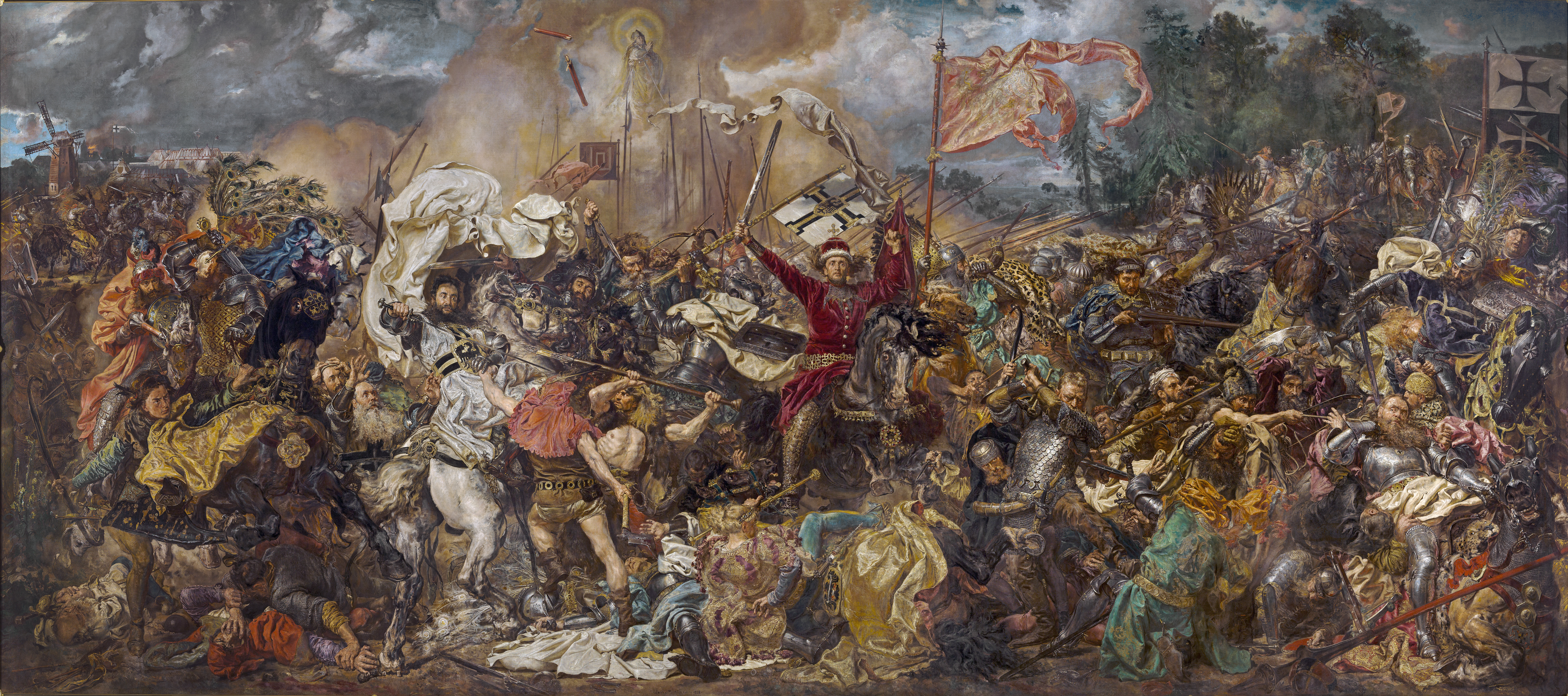
- Battle of Grunwald (1878)
Date	15 July 1410
Location	Between villages of Grünfelde (Grunwald) and Ludwigsdorf (Łodwigowo), State of the Teutonic Order
Result	Polish–Lithuanian victory

Belligerents
Kingdom of Poland; Grand Duchy of Lithuania; Vassals, allies and mercenaries: Masovia-Warsaw; Masovia-Płock; Pomerania-Stolp; Belz; Moldavia; Smolensk; Tatars from Golden Horde; Bohemians; Moravians; Silesians; Wallachians	Teutonic State; Vassals, allies and mercenaries: Guest crusaders; Pomerania-Stettin; Duchy of Oels; Prince-Bishopric of Warmia; Bishopric of Pomesania; Bishopric of Sambia; Mercenaries from Western Europe

Commanders and leaders
King Władysław II Jagiełło, supreme commander; Grand Duke Vytautas the Great, Lithuanian commander; Khan Jalal al-Din, Tatar commander	Grand Master Ulrich von Jungingen †; Grand Marshal Friedrich von Wallenrode †; Kuno von Lichtenstein †

Strength
16,000–39,000 men	11,000–27,000 men

Casualties and losses
Unknown; see Casualties and captives	203–211 out of 270 brothers killed See Casualties and captives
- Battle site on a map of modern Poland

The Battle of Grunwald, also known as the (First) Battle of Tannenberg or the Battle of Žalgiris, was fought on 15 July 1410 during the Polish–Lithuanian–Teutonic War. The alliance of the Crown of the Kingdom of Poland and the Grand Duchy of Lithuania, led respectively by King Władysław II Jagiełło (Jogaila), and Grand Duke Vytautas, decisively defeated the Teutonic Order, led by Grand Master Ulrich von Jungingen. Most of the Teutonic Order's leadership was killed or taken prisoner.

Although defeated, the Teutonic Order withstood the subsequent siege of the Malbork Castle and suffered minimal territorial losses at the Peace of Thorn (1411), with other territorial disputes continuing until the Treaty of Melno in 1422. The order, however, never recovered their former power, and the financial burden of war reparations caused internal conflicts and an economic downturn in the lands controlled by them. The battle shifted the balance of power in Central and Eastern Europe and marked the rise of the Polish–Lithuanian union as the dominant regional political and military force.

The battle was one of the largest in medieval Europe, and is viewed as one of the most important victories in the histories of Poland and Lithuania. It is also commemorated in Ukraine and Belarus. For centuries, it has been reinterpreted in that part of Europe as an inspiration of romanticism (to advance legends or mythology) and national pride, becoming a larger symbol of struggle against foreign invaders. During the 20th century, the battle was used in Nazi German and Soviet propaganda campaigns before and during World War II. Only in postwar decades have historians moved towards a dispassionate, scholarly assessment of the battle, reconciling the previous narratives, which differed widely by nation.

== Names and sources ==
=== Names ===
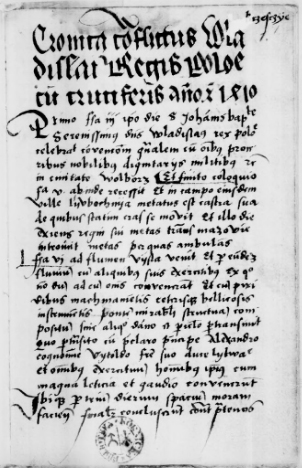
The most important source about the battle is Cronica conflictus Wladislai Regis Poloniae cum cruciferis anno Christi 1410

Traditionally, the battle's location was thought to be in the territory of the monastic state of the Teutonic Order, on the plains between three villages: Grünfelde (Grunwald) to the west, Tannenberg (Stębark) to the northeast and Ludwigsdorf (Łodwigowo, Ludwikowice) to the south. However, research by Swedish historian Sven Ekdahl and archaeological excavations in 2014–2017 proved that the actual site was south of Grünfelde (Grunwald). Władysław II Jagiełło referred to the site in Latin as in loco conflictus nostri, quem cum Cruciferis de Prusia habuimus, dicto Grunenvelt. Later, Polish chroniclers interpreted the word Grunenvelt ('green field' in Low German) as Grünwald ('green forest' in German. The Lithuanians followed suit by translating the name as Žalgiris, first used by Maironis in 1891. The Germans named the battle after Tannenberg ('fir hill' or 'pine hill' in German). Thus, there are three commonly used names for the battle: German: Schlacht bei Tannenberg, Polish: bitwa pod Grunwaldem, Lithuanian: Žalgirio mūšis. Its names in the languages of other involved peoples include Belarusian: Бітва пад Грунвальдам, Ukrainian: Грюнвальдська битва, Russian: Грюнвальдская битва, Czech: Bitva u Grunvaldu, Romanian: Bătălia de la Grünwald.

=== Sources ===
There are few contemporary, reliable sources about the battle, and most were produced by the Polish. The most important and trustworthy source is Cronica conflictus Wladislai regis Poloniae cum Cruciferis anno Christi 1410, which was written within a year of the battle by an eyewitness. Its authorship is uncertain, but several candidates have been proposed: Polish deputy chancellor Mikołaj Trąba and Władysław II Jagiełło's secretary Zbigniew Oleśnicki. While the original Cronica conflictus has not survived, a short summary from the 16th century has been preserved. Historiae Polonicae by Polish historian Jan Długosz (1415–1480). is a comprehensive and detailed account written several decades after the battle. The reliability of this source suffers not only from the long gap since the events, but also from Długosz's alleged biases against Lithuanians. Banderia Prutenorum is a mid-15th-century manuscript with images and Latin descriptions of the Teutonic battle flags captured during the battle and displayed in Wawel and Vilnius Cathedrals. Other Polish sources include two letters written by Władysław II Jagiełło to his wife Anne of Cilli and Bishop of Poznań Wojciech Jastrzębiec and letters sent by Jastrzębiec to Poles in the Holy See. German sources include a concise account in the chronicle of Johann von Posilge. An anonymous letter, discovered in 1963 and written between 1411 and 1413, provided important details on Lithuanian maneuvers.

== Historical context ==
=== Lithuanian Crusade and Polish–Lithuanian Union ===
The Kingdom of Poland and Grand Duchy of Lithuania within their vassals between 1386 and 1434

In 1230, the Teutonic Order, a crusading military order, moved to Chełmno Land (Kulmerland) and launched the Prussian Crusade against the pagan Prussian clans. With support from the pope and Holy Roman Emperor, the Teutons conquered and converted the Prussians by the 1280s and shifted their attention to the pagan Grand Duchy of Lithuania. For about 100 years, the order raided Lithuanian lands, particularly Samogitia, as it separated the order in Prussia from their branch in Livonia. While the border regions became an uninhabited wilderness, the order gained very little territory. The Lithuanians first gave up Samogitia during the Lithuanian Civil War (1381–1384) in the Treaty of Dubysa.

In 1385, Grand Duke Jogaila of Lithuania agreed to marry Queen Jadwiga of Poland in the Union of Kreva. Jogaila converted to Christianity and was crowned King of Poland and became known as Władysław II Jagiełło, thus creating a personal union between the Kingdom of Poland and the Grand Duchy of Lithuania. The official Lithuanian conversion to Christianity removed the religious rationale for the order's activities in the area. Its grand master, Conrad Zöllner von Rothenstein, supported by Hungarian King Sigismund of Luxemburg, responded by publicly contesting the sincerity of Jogaila's conversion, bringing the charge to a papal court. The territorial disputes continued over Samogitia, which had been in Teutonic hands since the Peace of Raciąż in 1404. Poland also had territorial claims against the order in Dobrzyń Land and Gdańsk (Danzig), but the two states had been largely at peace since the Treaty of Kalisz (1343). The conflict was also motivated by trade considerations: the order controlled the lower reaches of the three largest rivers (the Neman, Vistula and Daugava) in Poland and Lithuania.

=== War, truce and preparations ===
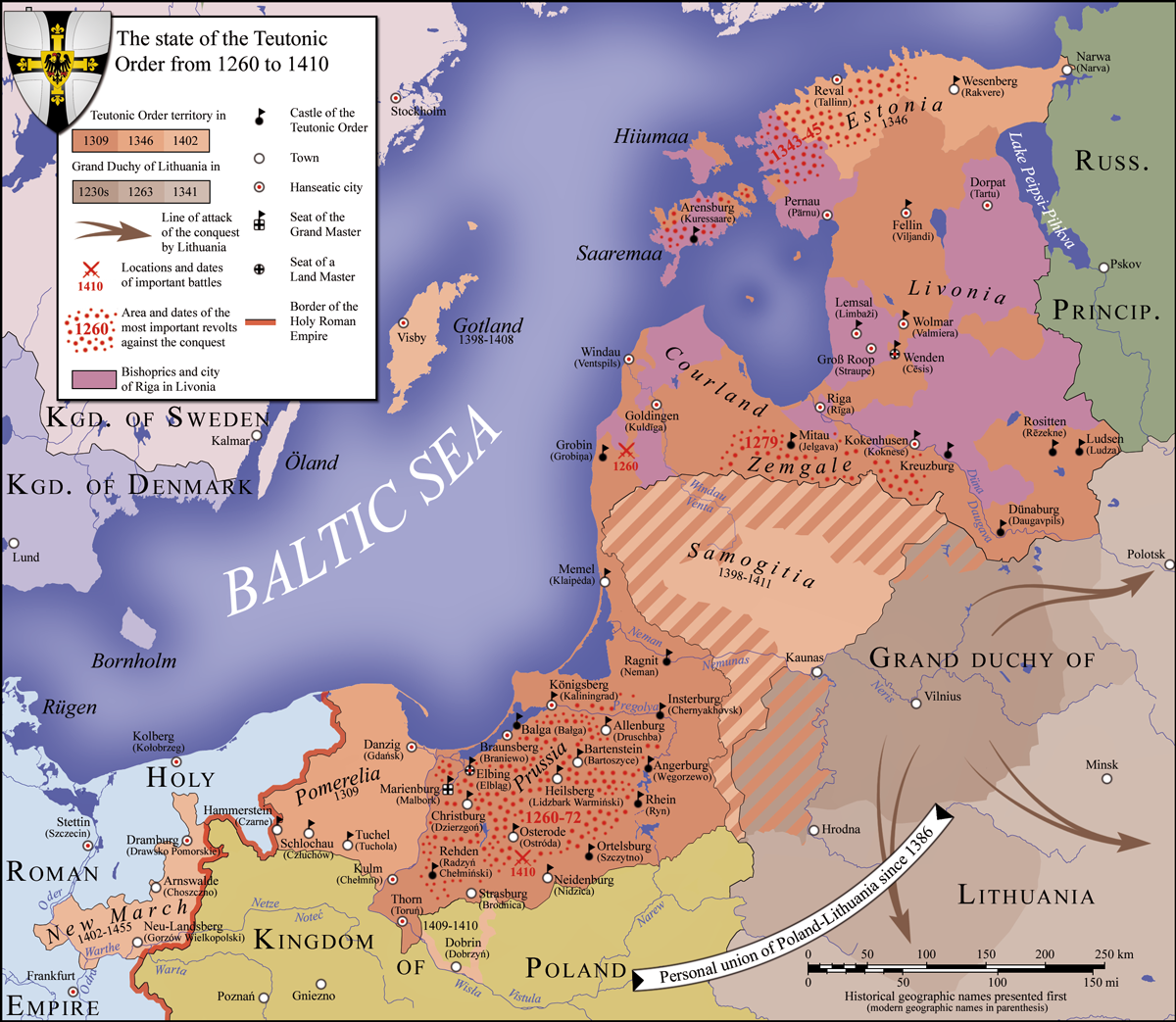
Territory of the State of the Teutonic Order between 1260 and 1410; the locations and dates of major battles, including the Battle of Grunwald, are indicated by crossed red swords.

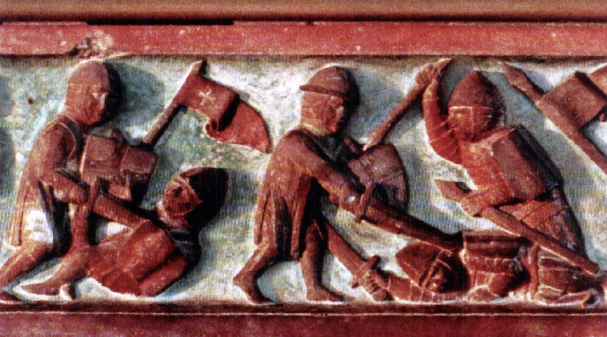
Lithuanians fighting with Teutonic knights (14th-century bas-relief from the Malbork Castle)

In May 1409, an uprising in Teutonic-held Samogitia started. Lithuania supported it and the order threatened to invade. Poland announced its support for the Lithuanian cause and threatened to invade Prussia in return. As Prussian troops evacuated Samogitia, Teutonic Grand Master Ulrich von Jungingen declared war on the Kingdom of Poland and the Grand Duchy of Lithuania on 6 August 1409. The order hoped to defeat Poland and Lithuania separately, and began by invading Greater Poland and Kuyavia, catching the Poles by surprise. The order burned the castle at Dobrin (Dobrzyń nad Wisłą), captured Bobrowniki after a 14-day siege, conquered Bydgoszcz (Bromberg) and sacked several towns. The Poles organized counterattacks and recaptured Bydgoszcz. The Samogitians attacked Memel (Klaipėda). However, neither side was ready for a full-scale war.

Wenceslaus, King of the Romans, agreed to mediate the dispute. A truce was signed on 8 October 1409 and was set to expire on 24 June 1410. Both sides used this time to prepare for war, gathering troops and engaging in diplomatic maneuvering. Both sides sent letters and envoys accusing each other of various wrongdoings and threats to Christendom. Wenceslaus, who received a gift of 60,000 florins from the order, declared that Samogitia rightfully belonged to the order and only Dobrzyń Land should be returned to Poland. The order also paid 300,000 ducats to Sigismund of Hungary, who had ambitions regarding the Principality of Moldavia, for mutual military assistance. Sigismund attempted to break the Polish–Lithuanian alliance by offering Vytautas a king's crown; Vytautas' acceptance would have violated the terms of the Ostrów Agreement and created Polish-Lithuanian discord. At the same time, Vytautas managed to obtain a truce from the Livonian Order.

By December 1409, Władysław II Jagiełło and Vytautas had agreed on a common strategy: their armies would unite into a single massive force and march together towards Marienburg (Malbork), capital of the Teutonic Order. The order, who took a defensive position, did not expect a joint attack and were preparing for a dual invasion—by the Poles along the Vistula River towards Danzig (Gdańsk) and the Lithuanians along the Neman River towards Ragnit (Neman). To counter this perceived threat, Ulrich von Jungingen concentrated his forces in Schwetz (Świecie), a central location from where troops could respond to an invasion from any direction rather quickly. Sizable garrisons were left in the eastern castles of Ragnit, Rhein (Ryn) near Lötzen (Giżycko) and Memel (Klaipėda). To keep their plans secret and mislead the order, Władysław II Jagiełło and Vytautas organized several raids into border territories, thus forcing the order to keep their troops in place.

== Opposing forces ==
Various estimates of opposing forces
Historian	Polish	Lithuanian	Teutonic
Karl Heveker and Hans Delbrück	10,500	6,000	11,000
Eugene Razin	16,000–17,000		11,000
Max Oehler	23,000		15,000
Jerzy Ochmański	22,000–27,000		12,000
Sven Ekdahl	20,000–25,000		12,000–15,000
Andrzej Nadolski	20,000	10,000	15,000
Jan Dąbrowski	15,000–18,000	8,000–11,000	19,000
Zigmantas Kiaupa	18,000	11,000	15,000–21,000
Marian Biskup	19,000–20,000	10,000–11,000	21,000
Daniel Stone	27,000	11,000	21,000
Stefan Kuczyński	39,000		27,000
James Westfall Thompson and Edgar Nathaniel Johnson	100,000		35,000
Alfred Nicolas Rambaud	163,000		86,000
Average	43,000		23,000

The precise number of soldiers involved has proven difficult to establish. None of the contemporary sources provided reliable troop counts. Jan Długosz provided the number of banners, the principal unit of each cavalry: 51 for the Teutons, 50 for the Poles and 40 for the Lithuanians. However, it is unclear how many men were under each banner. The structure and number of infantry units (pikemen, archers, crossbowmen) and artillery units is unknown. Estimates, often biased by political and nationalistic considerations, were produced by various historians. German historians tend to present lower numbers, while Polish historians tend to use higher estimates. The high-end estimates by Polish historian Stefan Kuczyński of 39,000 Polish–Lithuanian and 27,000 Teutonic men have been cited in Western literature as "commonly accepted".

While outnumbered, the Teutonic army had advantages in discipline, military training and equipment. They were particularly noted for their heavy cavalry, although only a small percentage of the Order's army at Grunwald were heavily armoured knights. The Teutonic army was also equipped with bombards that could shoot lead and stone projectiles.

Both armies were composed of troops from several states and lands, including numerous mercenaries, primarily from Silesia and Bohemia. Bohemian mercenaries fought on both sides. The Silesian mercenaries were led in battle by Duke Konrad VII the White, of Oels, who was supported by knights from the Silesian nobility including Dietrich von Kottulin and Hans von Motschelnitz.

Soldiers from twenty-two different states and regions, mostly Germanic, joined the Order's army. Teutonic recruits known as guest crusaders included soldiers from Westphalia, Frisia, Austria, Swabia, Bavaria, and Stettin (Szczecin). Two Hungarian nobles, Nicholas II Garai and Stibor of Stiboricz, brought 200 men for the Order, but support from Sigismund of Hungary was disappointing.

Poland brought mercenaries from Moravia and Bohemia. The Czechs produced two full banners, under the command of John Sokol of Lamberg. Serving among the Czechs was possibly Jan Žižka, future commander of the Hussites. Alexander I of Moldavia commanded an expeditionary corps and the Moldavian king was so brave that the Polish troops and their king honoured him with a royal sword, the Szczerbiec. Vytautas gathered troops from Lithuanian and Ruthenian lands (present-day Belarus and Ukraine). Among them were three banners from Smolensk led by Władysław II Jagiełło's brother Lengvenis, the Tatar contingent of the Golden Horde under the command of the future Khan Jalal al-Din, and Armenian cavalry troops from Podolia. The overall commander of the joint Polish–Lithuanian force was King Władysław II Jagiełło; however, he did not directly participate in the battle. The Lithuanian units were commanded directly by Grand Duke Vytautas, who was second in command, and helped design the grand strategy of the campaign. Vytautas actively participated in the battle, managing both Lithuanian and Polish units. Jan Długosz stated that the low-ranking swordbearer of the Crown, Zyndram of Maszkowice, commanded the Polish army, but that is highly doubtful. More likely, marshal of the Crown Zbigniew of Brzezia commanded the Polish troops in the field.

== Course of the battle ==
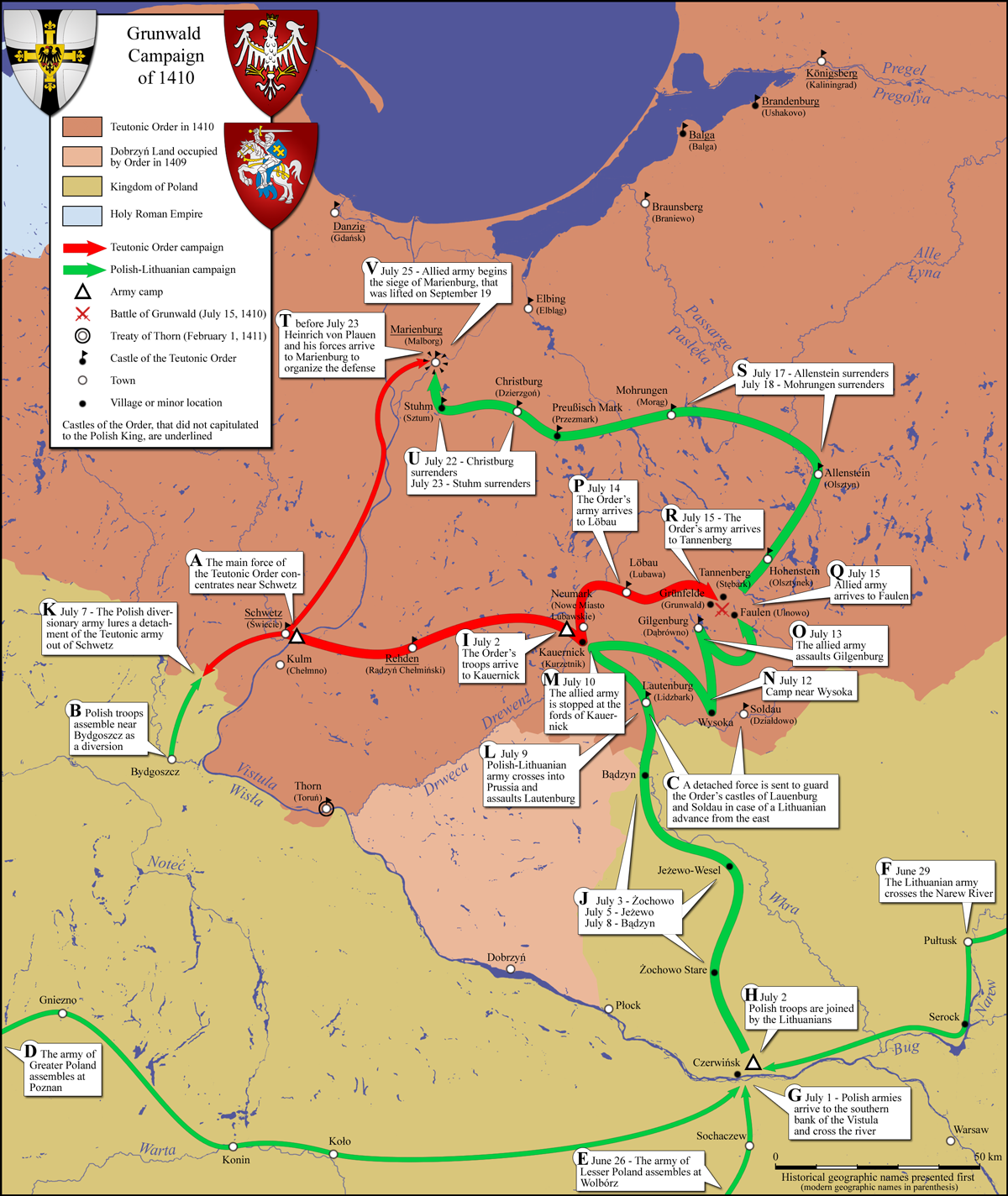
Map of army movements in the Grunwald campaign

=== March into Prussia ===
The first stage of the Grunwald campaign was the gathering of all Polish–Lithuanian troops at Czerwińsk, a designated meeting point about 80 km (50 mi) from the Prussian border, where the joint army crossed the Vistula over a pontoon bridge. This maneuver, which required precision and intense coordination among multi-ethnic forces, was accomplished in about a week, from 24 to 30 June. Polish soldiers from Greater Poland gathered in Poznań, and those from Lesser Poland, in Wolbórz. On 24 June 1410, Władysław II Jagiełło and Czech mercenaries arrived in Wolbórz. Three days later, the Polish army was already at the meeting place. The Lithuanian army marched out from Vilnius on 3 June and joined the Ruthenian regiments in Hrodna. They arrived in Czerwińsk on the same day the Poles crossed the river. After the crossing, Masovian troops under Siemowit IV and Janusz I joined the Polish–Lithuanian army. The massive force began its march north towards Marienburg (Malbork), capital of Prussia, on 3 July. The Prussian border was crossed on 9 July.

The river crossing remained secret until Hungarian envoys, who were attempting to negotiate a peace, informed the Grand Master. As soon as Ulrich von Jungingen grasped the Polish–Lithuanian intentions, he left 3,000 men at Schwetz (Świecie) under Heinrich von Plauen and marched the main force to organize a line of defense on the Drewenz River (Drwęca) near Kauernik (Kurzętnik). The river crossing was fortified with stockades. On 11 July 1410, after meeting with his eight-member war council, Władysław II Jagiełło decided against crossing the river at such a strong, defensible position. The army would instead bypass the river crossing by turning east, towards its sources, where no other major rivers separated his army from Marienburg. The march continued east towards Soldau (Działdowo), although no attempt was made to capture the town. The Teutonic army followed the Drewenz River north, crossed it near Löbau (Lubawa) and then moved east in parallel with the Polish–Lithuanian army. According to the Order's propaganda, the latter ravaged the village of Gilgenburg (Dąbrówno). Later, in the self-serving testimonies of the survivors before the Pope, the order claimed that Von Jungingen was so enraged by the alleged atrocities that he swore to defeat the invaders in battle.

=== Battle preparations ===
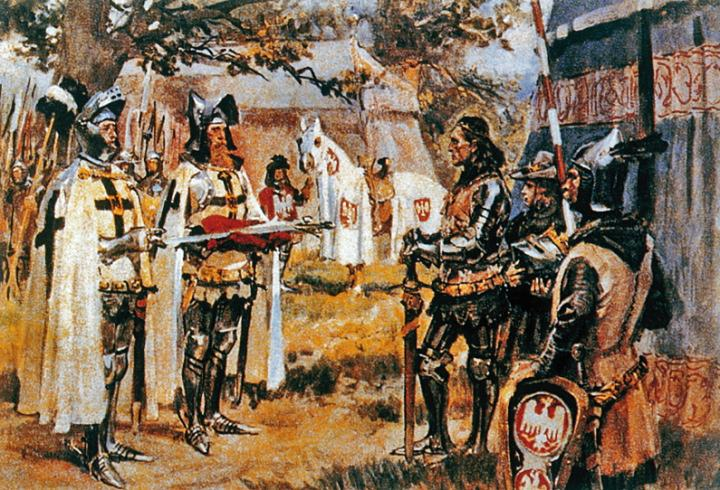
The Teutonic Order presents the Grunwald Swords as a gift to King Władysław II Jagiełło (painting by Wojciech Kossak).

In the early morning of 15 July 1410, both armies met in an area covering approximately 4 km^{2} (1.5 sq mi) between the villages of Grünfelde (Grunwald), Tannenberg (Stębark) and Ludwigsdorf (Łodwigowo). The armies formed opposing lines along a northeast–southwest axis. The Polish–Lithuanian army was positioned in front and east of Ludwigsdorf and Tannenberg. Polish heavy cavalry formed the left flank, Lithuanian light cavalry the right flank and various mercenary troops made up the center. Their men were organized in three lines of wedge-shaped formations about 20 men deep. The Teutonic forces concentrated their elite heavy cavalry, commanded by Grand Marshal Frederic von Wallenrode, against the Lithuanians. The order, which was the first to organize their army for the battle, hoped to provoke the Poles or Lithuanians into attacking first. Their troops, wearing heavy armor, had to stand in the scorching sun for several hours waiting for an attack. One chronicle suggested that they had dug pits that an attacking army would fall into. They also attempted to use field artillery, but a light rain dampened their powder and only two cannon shots were fired. As Władysław II Jagiełło delayed, the Grand Master sent messengers with two swords to "assist Władysław II Jagiełło and Vytautas in battle". The swords were meant as an insult and a provocation. Known as the "Grunwald Swords", they became one of the national symbols of Poland.

=== Battle begins: Lithuanian attack and retreat maneuver ===
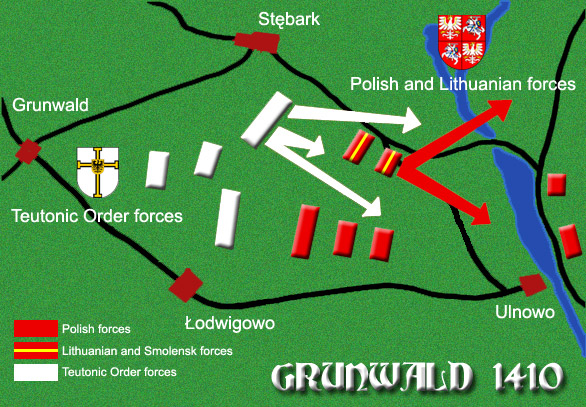
Retreat of Lithuanian light cavalry (battle location and initial army positions according to an 1836 map by Johannes Voigt and contradicted by archaeological excavations in 2014–2017).

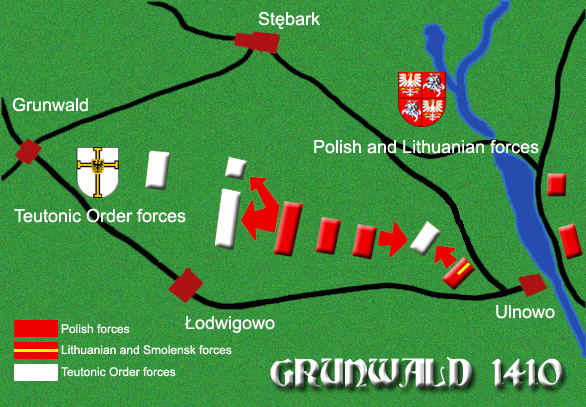
Right-flank Polish–Lithuanian assault

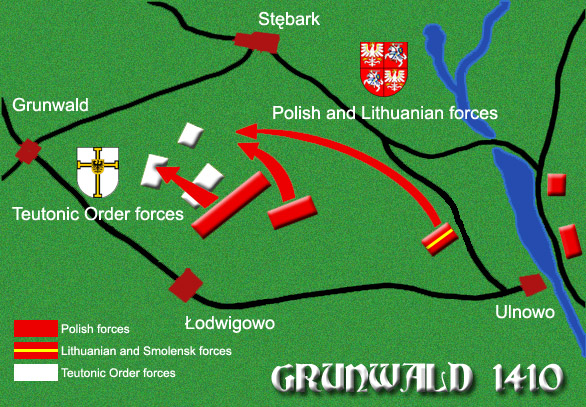
Polish heavy-cavalry breakthrough

Vytautas, supported by the Polish banners, started an assault on the left flank of the Teutonic forces. After more than an hour of heavy fighting, the Lithuanian light cavalry began a full retreat. Jan Długosz described this development as a complete annihilation of the entire Lithuanian army. According to Długosz, the Order assumed that victory was theirs, broke their formation for a disorganized pursuit of the retreating Lithuanians, and gathered much loot before returning to the battlefield to face the Polish troops. He made no mention of the Lithuanians, who later returned to the battlefield. Thus, Długosz portrayed the battle as a single-handed Polish victory. This view contradicted Cronica conflictus and has been challenged by modern historians.

Starting with an article by Vaclaw Lastowski in 1909, they proposed that the retreat had been a planned maneuver borrowed from the Golden Horde. A feigned retreat had been used in the Battle of the Vorskla River (1399), when the Lithuanian army had been dealt a crushing defeat and Vytautas himself had barely escaped alive. This theory gained wider acceptance after the discovery and publication, in 1963 by Swedish historian Sven Ekdahl, of a German letter. Written a few years after the battle, it cautioned the new Grand Master to look out for feigned retreats of the kind that had been used in the Great Battle. Stephen Turnbull asserts that the Lithuanian tactical retreat did not quite fit the formula of a feigned retreat; such a retreat was usually staged by one or two units (as opposed to almost an entire army) and was swiftly followed by a counterattack (whereas the Lithuanians had returned late in the battle).

=== Battle continues: Polish–Teutonic fight ===
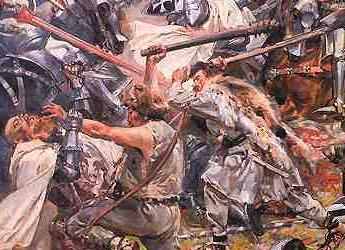
Muslim Tatar fights a Teutonic knight (detail from a painting by Wojciech Kossak)

While the Lithuanians were retreating, heavy fighting broke out between Polish and Teutonic forces. Commanded by Grand Komtur Kuno von Lichtenstein, the Teutonic forces concentrated on the Polish right flank. Six of von Walenrode's banners did not pursue the retreating Lithuanians, instead joining the attack on the right flank. A particularly valuable target was the royal banner of Kraków. It seemed that the order was gaining the upper hand, and at one point the royal standard-bearer, Marcin of Wrocimowice, lost the Kraków banner. However, it was soon recaptured and fighting continued. Władysław II Jagiełło deployed his reserves — the second line of his army. Grand Master Ulrich von Jungingen then personally led 16 banners, almost a third of the original Teutonic strength, to the right Polish flank, and Władysław II Jagiełło deployed his last reserves, the third line of his army. The melee reached the Polish command and one knight, identified as Lupold or Diepold of Kökeritz, charged directly against King Władysław II Jagiełło. Władysław's secretary, Zbigniew Oleśnicki, saved the king's life, gaining royal favor and becoming one of the most influential people in Poland.

=== Battle ends: Teutonic Order defeated ===
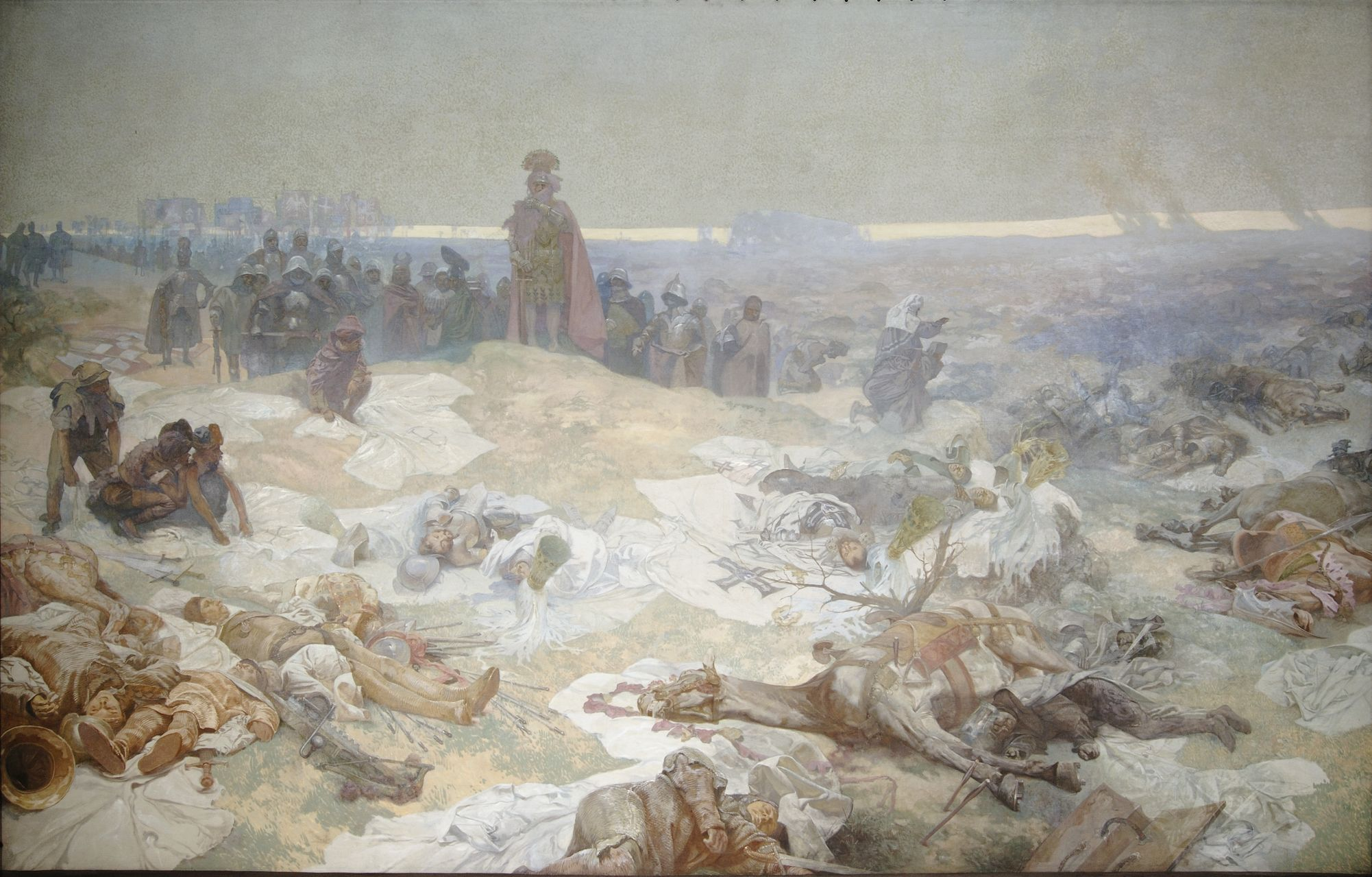
After the Battle of Grunwald: The Solidarity of the Northern Slavs (1924), by Alfons Mucha, The Slav Epic

At that time, the reorganised Lithuanians returned to the battle, attacking von Jungingen from the rear. The Teutonic forces were by then becoming outnumbered by the mass of Polish knights and advancing Lithuanian cavalry. As von Jungingen attempted to break through the Lithuanian lines, he was killed. According to Cronica conflictus, Dobiesław of Oleśnica thrust a lance through the Grand Master's neck, while Długosz presented Mszczuj of Skrzynno as the killer. Surrounded and leaderless, the Teutonic Order began to retreat. Part of the routed units retreated towards their camp. This move backfired when the camp followers turned against their masters and joined the manhunt. The knights attempted to build a wagon fort: the camp was surrounded by wagons serving as an improvised fortification. However, the defense was soon broken and the camp was ravaged. According to Cronica conflictus, more knights died there than on the battlefield. The battle lasted for about ten hours.

The Teutonic Order attributed the defeat to treason on the part of Nicholas von Renys (Mikołaj of Ryńsk), commander of the Culm (Chełmno) banner, and he was beheaded without a trial. He was the founder and leader of the Lizard Union, a group of knights sympathetic to Poland. According to the order, von Renys lowered his banner, which was taken as a signal of surrender and led to the panicked retreat. The legend that the order was "stabbed in the back" was echoed in the stab-in-the-back myth post-World War I and preoccupied German historiography of the battle until 1945.

== Aftermath ==
=== Casualties and captives ===
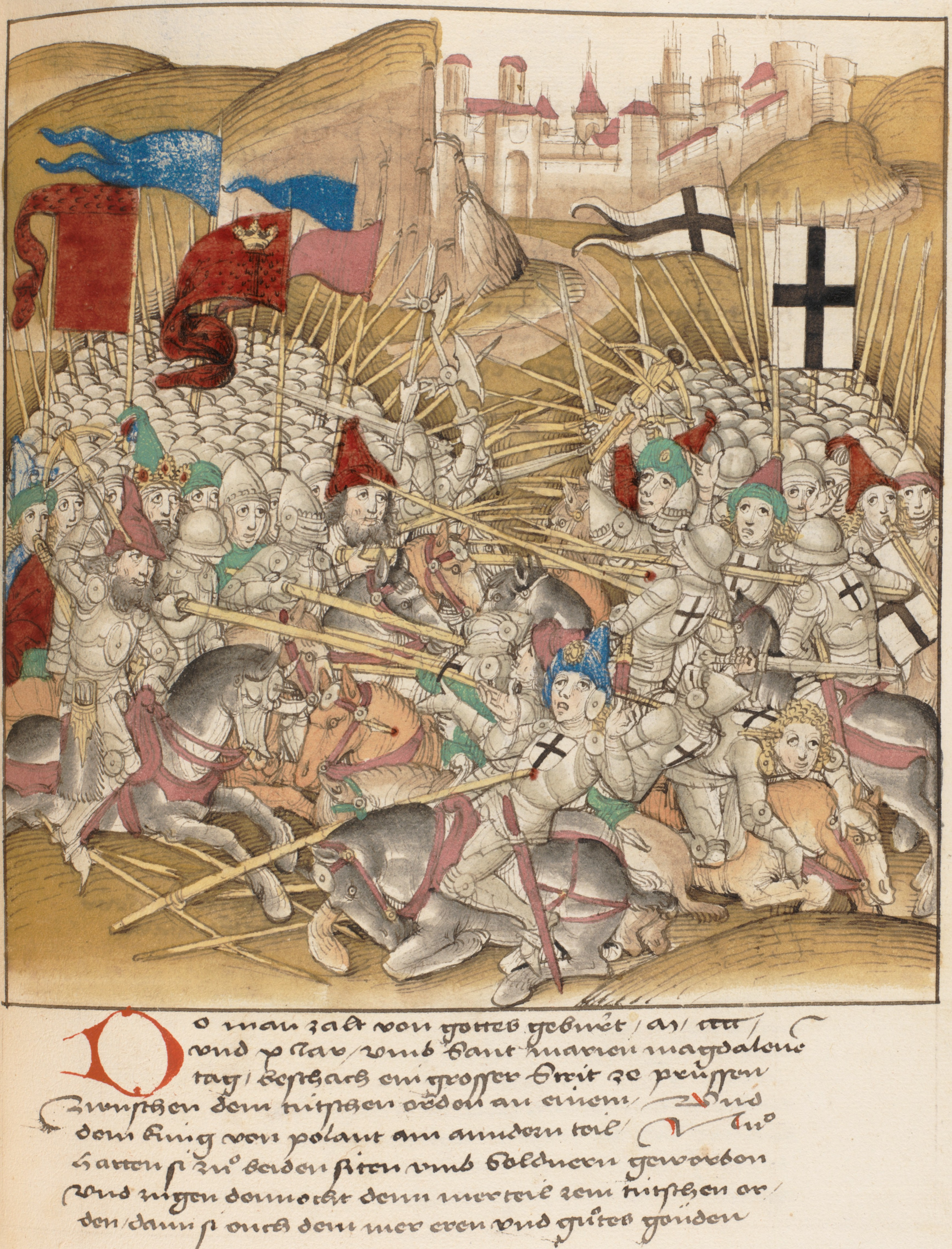
The battle as depicted in the Spiezer Chronik of Diebold Schilling

A note sent in August by envoys of King Sigismund of Hungary, Nicholas II Garai and Stibor of Stiboricz, put total casualties at 8,000 dead "on both sides". However, the wording is vague and it is unclear whether it meant a total of 8,000 or 16,000 dead. A papal bull from 1412 mentioned 18,000 dead Christians. In two letters written immediately after the battle, Władysław II Jagiełło mentioned that Polish casualties were small (paucis valde and modico) and Jan Długosz listed only 12 Polish knights who had been killed. A letter by a Teutonic official from Tapiau (Gvardeysk) mentioned that only half of the Lithuanians returned, but it is unclear how many of those casualties are attributable to the battle and how many to the later siege of Marienburg.

The defeat of the Teutonic Order was resounding. According to Teutonic payroll records, only 1,427 men reported back to Marienburg to claim their pay. Of 1,200 men sent from Danzig, only 300 returned. Between 203 and 211 brothers of the Order were killed, out of 270 that participated in battle, including much of the Teutonic leadership — Grand Master Ulrich von Jungingen, Grand Marshal Friedrich von Wallenrode, Grand Komtur Kuno von Lichtenstein, Grand Treasurer Thomas von Merheim, Marshal of Supply Forces Albrecht von Schwartzburg, and ten of the komturs. Marquard von Salzbach, Komtur of Brandenburg (Ushakovo) and Heinrich Schaumburg, voigt of Sambia, were executed by order of Vytautas after the battle. The bodies of von Jungingen and other high-ranking officials were transported to Marienburg Castle for burial on 19 July. The bodies of lower-ranking Teutonic officials and 12 Polish knights were buried at the church in Tannenberg. The rest of the dead were buried in several mass graves. The highest-ranking Teutonic official to escape the battle was Werner von Tettinger, Komtur of Elbing (Elbląg).

Polish and Lithuanian forces took several thousand captives. Among these were Dukes Konrad VII of Oels (Oleśnica) and Casimir V of Pomerania. Most of the commoners and mercenaries were released shortly after the battle on condition that they report to Kraków on 11 November 1410. Only those who were expected to pay ransom were kept. Considerable ransoms were recorded; for example, the mercenary Holbracht von Loym had to pay 150 kopas of Prague groschen, amounting to more than 30 kg (66 lb) of silver.

=== Further campaign and peace ===
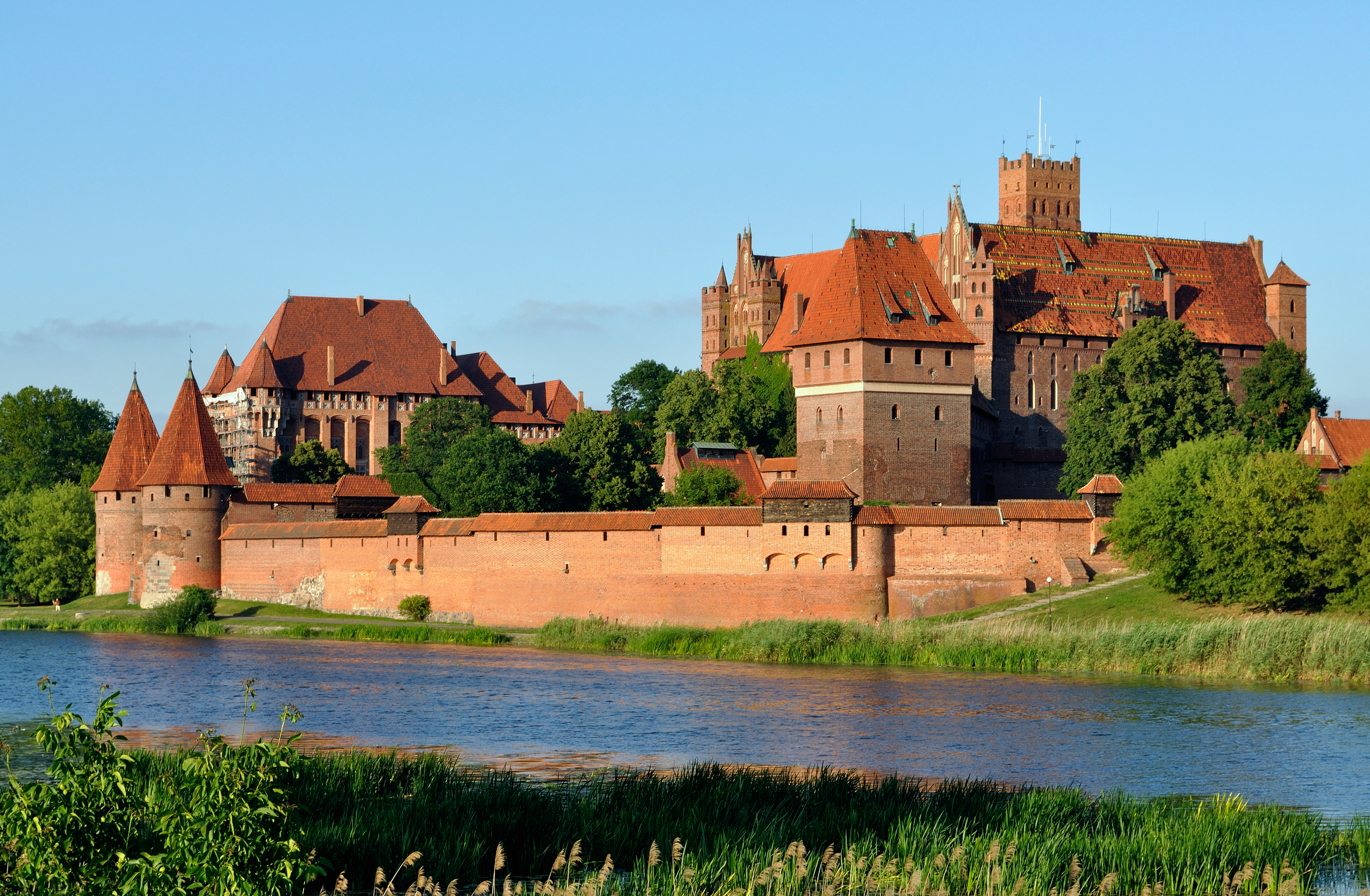
After the battle, the Malbork Castle, which served as the Teutonic capital, was unsuccessfully besieged for two months by the Polish–Lithuanian forces

After the battle, the Polish and Lithuanian forces delayed their attack on the Teutonic capital in Marienburg (Malbork), remaining on the battlefield for three days and then marching an average of only about 15 km (9.3 mi) per day. The main forces did not reach heavily fortified Marienburg until 26 July. This delay gave Heinrich von Plauen enough time to organize a defense. Władysław II Jagiełło also sent his troops to other Teutonic fortresses, which often surrendered without resistance, including the major cities of Danzig (Gdańsk), Thorn (Toruń), and Elbing (Elbląg). Only eight castles remained in Teutonic hands. The besiegers of Marienburg expected a speedy capitulation and were not prepared for a long siege, suffering from lack of ammunition, low morale, and an epidemic of dysentery. The order appealed to their allies for help, and Sigismund of Hungary, Wenceslaus, King of the Romans, and the Livonian Order promised financial aid and reinforcements.

The siege of Marienburg was lifted on 19 September. The Polish–Lithuanian forces left garrisons in the fortresses they had taken and returned home. However, the order quickly recaptured most of the castles. By the end of October, only four Teutonic castles along the border remained in Polish hands. Władysław II Jagiełło raised a fresh army and dealt another defeat to the order in the Battle of Koronowo on 10 October 1410. Following other brief engagements, both sides agreed to negotiate.

The Peace of Thorn was signed in February 1411. Under its terms, the order ceded the Dobrin Land (Dobrzyń Land) to Poland and agreed to resign their claims to Samogitia during the lifetimes of Władysław II Jagiełło and Vytautas, although another two wars — the Hunger War of 1414 and the Gollub War of 1422 — would be waged before the Treaty of Melno permanently resolved the territorial disputes. The Poles and Lithuanians were unable to translate the military victory into territorial or diplomatic gains. However, the Peace of Thorn imposed a heavy financial burden on the order from which they never recovered. They had to pay an indemnity in silver in four annual installments. To meet these payments, the order borrowed heavily, confiscated gold and silver from churches, and increased taxes. Two major Prussian cities, Danzig (Gdańsk) and Thorn (Toruń), revolted against the tax increases. The defeat at Grunwald left the Teutonic Order with few forces to defend their remaining territories. Since Samogitia became officially christened, as both Poland and Lithuania were for a long time, the order had difficulties recruiting new volunteer crusaders. The Grand Masters then needed to rely on mercenary troops, which proved an expensive drain on their already depleted budget. The internal conflicts, economic decline, and tax increases led to unrest and the foundation of the Prussian Confederation, or Alliance against Lordship, in 1441. This in turn led to a series of conflicts that culminated in the Thirteen Years' War (1454).

== Battlefield memorials ==
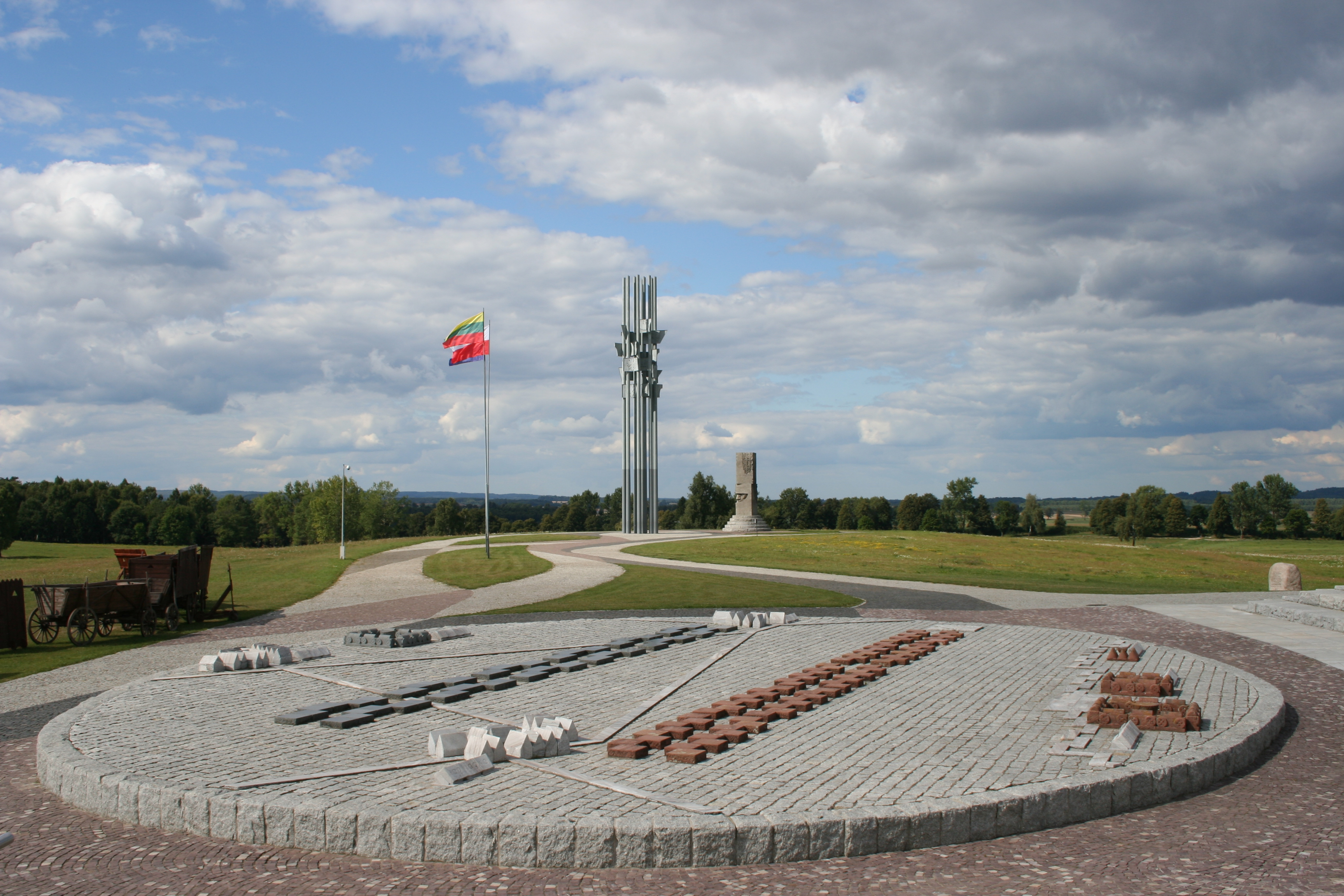
Memorials at the battlefield built in 1960

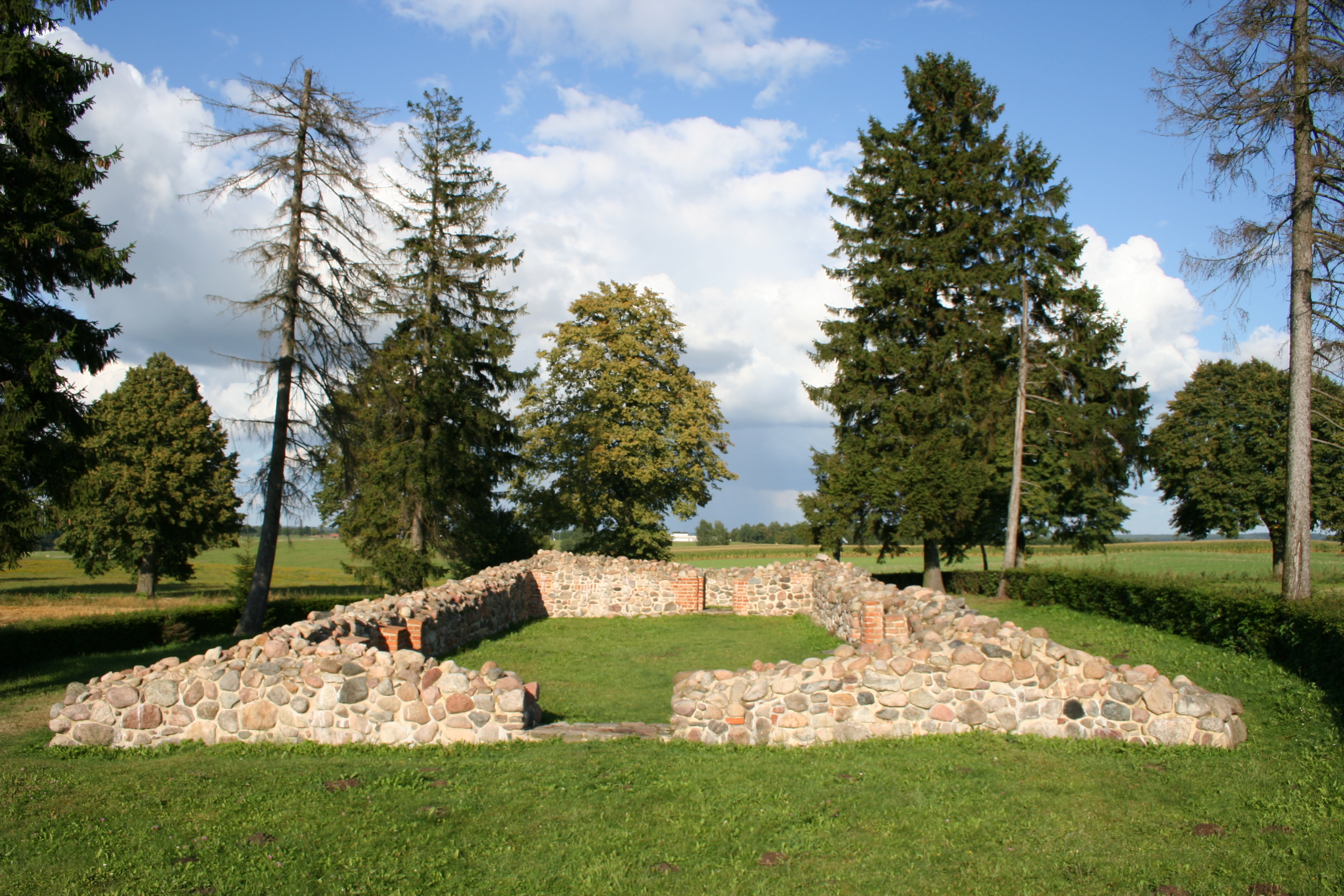
Ruins of the Chapel of St. Mary

Ideas about commemorating the battle rose right after the event. Władysław II Jagiełło wanted to build a monastery dedicated to Saint Bridget of Sweden, who had prophesied the downfall of the Teutonic Order, at the location of the battle. When the order regained the territory of the battlefield, the new grand master Heinrich von Plauen built a chapel dedicated to Saint Mary and it was consecrated in March 1413. It was destroyed by the Poles when they invaded during the Hunger War of 1414, but it was quickly rebuilt. The chapel fell into ruins during the Protestant Reformation and was demolished in 1720. Over time, the location of the chapel became associated with the location where Grand Master Ulrich von Jungingen was killed. In 1901, a large memorial stone was erected for the fallen Grand Master in the midst of the chapel ruins for the 200th anniversary of the coronation of King Frederick I of Prussia. The inscription was chiseled in 1960 and the stone was removed from the chapel ruins and placed with the inscription facing down in 1984.

In 1960, for the 550th anniversary, a museum and monuments were constructed a little northeast of the chapel ruins. The grounds were designed by sculptor Jerzy Bandura and architect Witold Cęckiewicz. The monuments included an obelisk of Silesian granite depicting two faces of knights, a bundle of eleven 30-metre (98 ft)-high flagpoles with emblems of the Polish–Lithuanian army, and a sculptural map depicting the supposed positions of the armies before the battle. Presumed locations where Władysław II Jagiełło and Vytautas had their main camps were marked with artificial mounds and flagpoles. The battle site is one of Poland's national Historical Monuments, as designated on 4 October 2010, and tracked by the National Institute of Cultural Heritage. The museum, which is open during the summer, has an exhibition space of 275 square metres (2,960 sq ft) in which it displays archaeological finds from the battlefield, original and reproduced medieval weapons, reconstructed flags from the battle, as well as various maps, drawings, and documents related to the battle. In 2018, the museum was visited by about 140,000 people. Construction of a larger year-round museum at an estimated cost of 30 million Polish złoty (6.5 million euros) started in April 2019.

In July 2020, a large stone with engraved Vytis was erected by the Lithuanians near the monument site to commemorate the 610th anniversary of the battle. The monument was unveiled by Lithuanian and Polish presidents Gitanas Nausėda and Andrzej Duda.

== Archaeological excavations ==
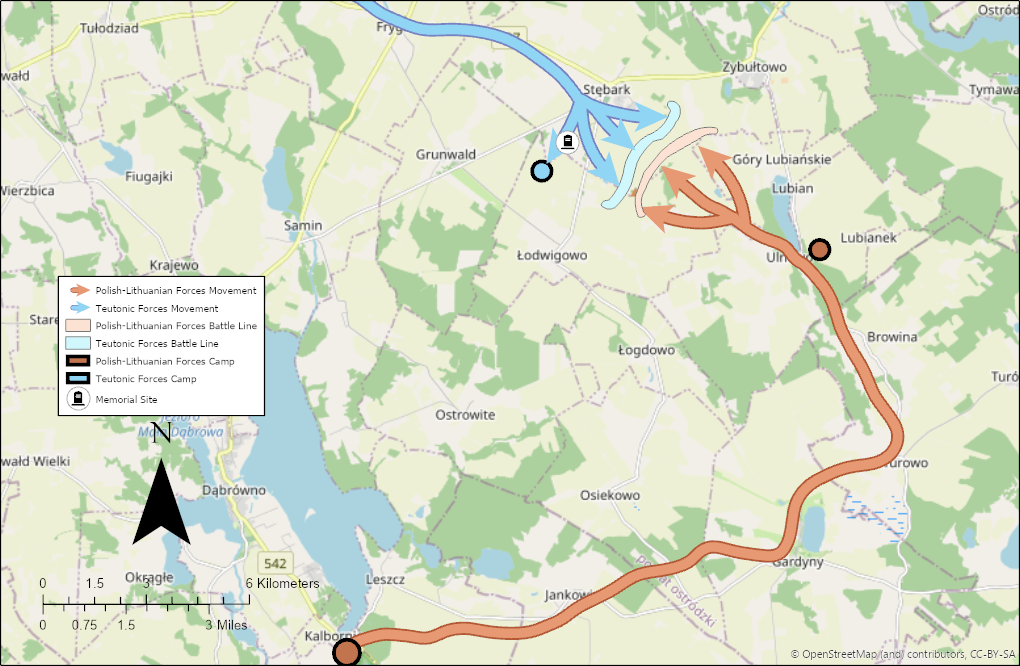
Traditional view of army movements and battlefield location according to descriptions by Jan Długosz and map first published by Johannes Voigt in 1836

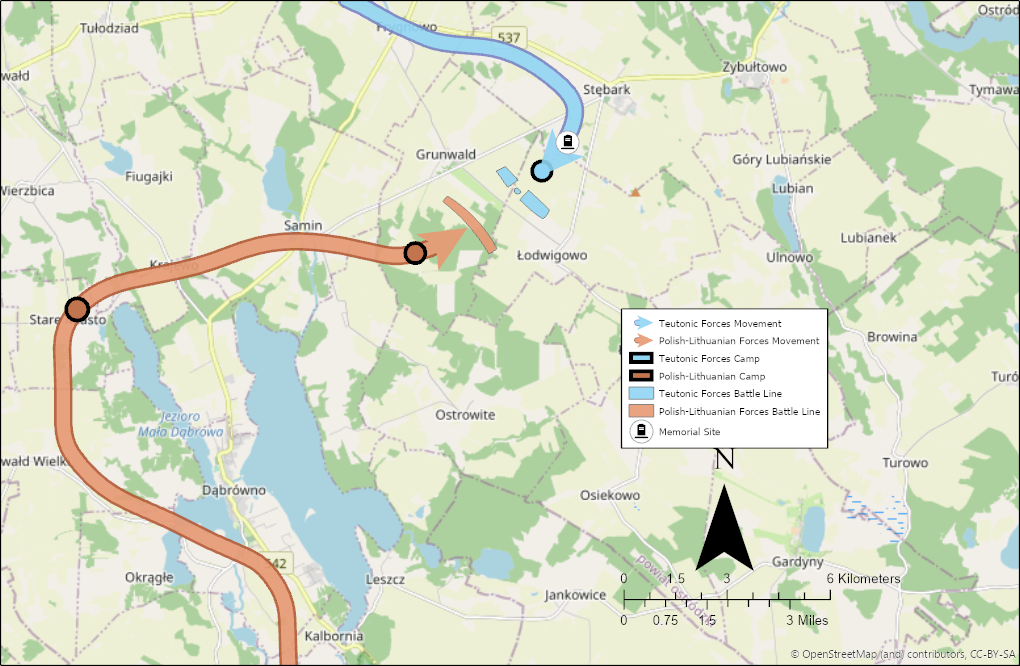
Proposed army movements and battlefield locations according to Sven Ekdahl

Several artifacts from the battlefield are known from historical record, for example stone balls in the church of Stębark (Tannenberg) and a metal helmet with holes in the church of Mielno which was gifted to Frederick William IV of Prussia when he visited the battlefield in 1842, but they have not survived to the present day. The first amateur archaeological research was carried out in 1911 in hopes of finding the mass graves mentioned by Jan Długosz at the church of Stębark. The church was surveyed with ground-penetrating radar in 2013, but little evidence of the mass graves was found.

The first more thorough archaeological excavations of the battlefield were carried out in 1958–1960 in the run-up to the 550th anniversary, connected to the construction of the memorial site and museum. The government showed great interest in the excavations and sent helicopters and 160 soldiers to help. Research continued in later decades, but yielded very little results with the exception of the area around the ruined chapel. Several mass graves were found at the chapel: remains of six people in the vestibule, 30 people next to the southern wall, more than 130 people in three pits adjacent to the chapel, and about 90 people in the sacristy. Many remains showed signs of traumatic injuries. Some skeletons showed signs of being burned and moved. Mass burials, including of women and children, were also found in the villages of Gilgenburg (Dąbrówno) and Faulen (Ulnowo). The massacre in Gilgenburg was known from written sources, but the burial in Faulen was unexpected. In the fields, very few items of militaria were found. In 1958–1990, only 28 artefacts were found connected to the battle: ten crossbow bolts, five arrowheads, a javelin head, two sword pieces, two gun bullets, six pieces of gauntlets, and two small arms bullets.

In 2009, Swedish historian Sven Ekdahl published his long-held hypothesis that the traditionally accepted location of the battlefield was incorrect. He believed that the surveys near the chapel ruins were actually around the site of the Teutonic Order's camp. According to Ekdahl's theory, the main battlefield was located northeast of the road between Grunwald and Łodwigowo, about 2 kilometres (1.2 mi) southwest of the memorial site. Between 2014 and 2019, archaeologists from Scandinavia and Poland investigated an area of approximately 450 hectares (1,100 acres) with metal detectors and located the main battle site according to Ekdahl's predictions. In 2017, the team found approximately 65 crossbow bolts and 20 arrowheads, as well as parts of spurs, stirrups, gauntlets, etc. As of 2020, archaeologists had discovered about 1,500 artifacts, of which about 150 are linked to the battle. Among them are a Teutonic clasp to fasten a coat with the Gothic inscription "Ave Maria", a seal with the image of a pelican feeding its young with blood, two well preserved axes, and Teutonic coins.

The 2014-2019 surveys have been criticised due to inconsistent publications and not following scientific techniques established by battlefield archaeology. These include preservation of findings, lack of survey maps and inconsistent recording of GPS data. There has also been a lack of funding from the Polish government for reliable research of the entire battlefield.

== Legacy ==
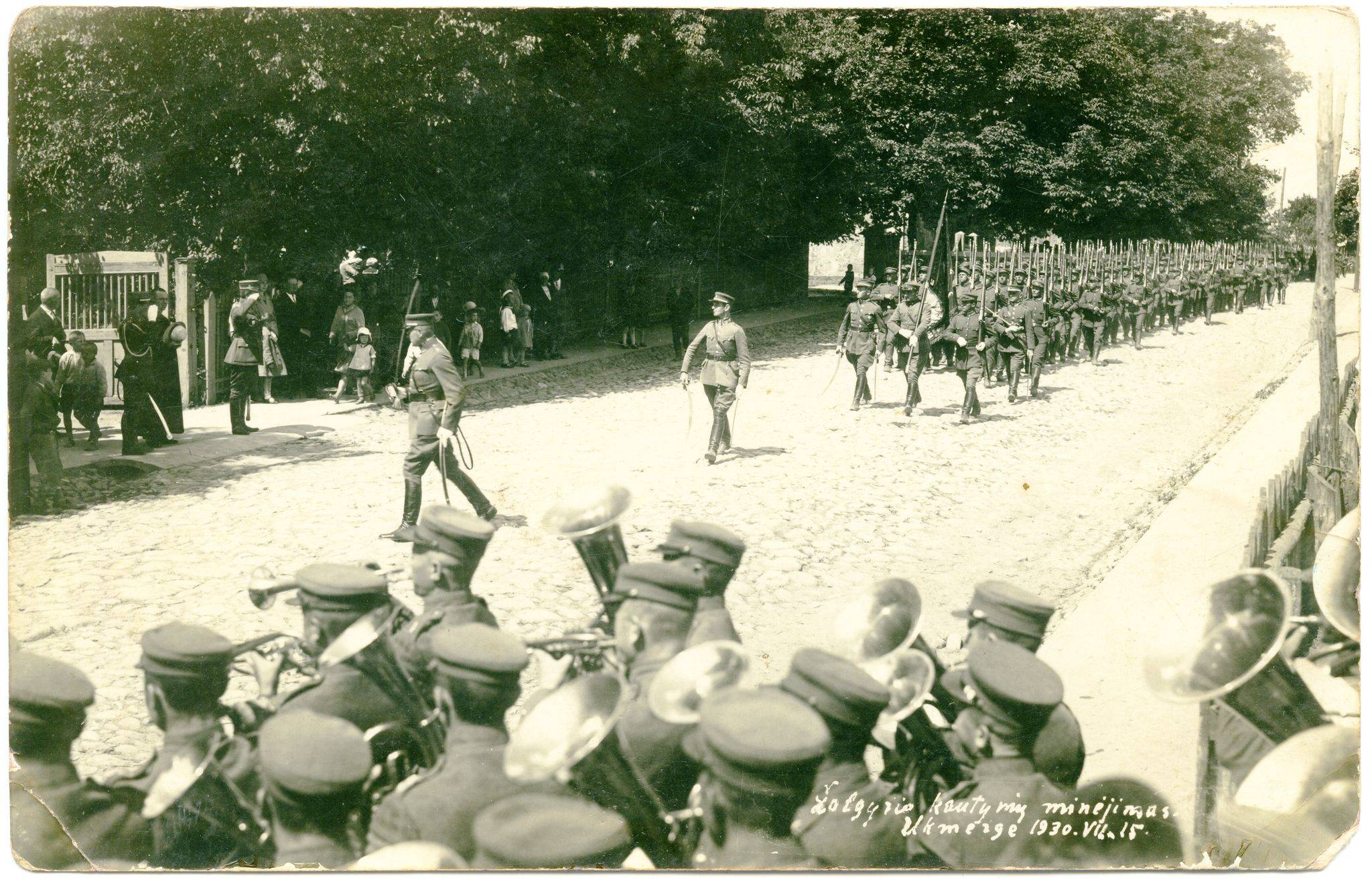
Military parade of the 1st Infantry Regiment of the Lithuanian Grand Duke Gediminas during commemoration of the battle of Žalgiris in Ukmergė on 15 July 1930.

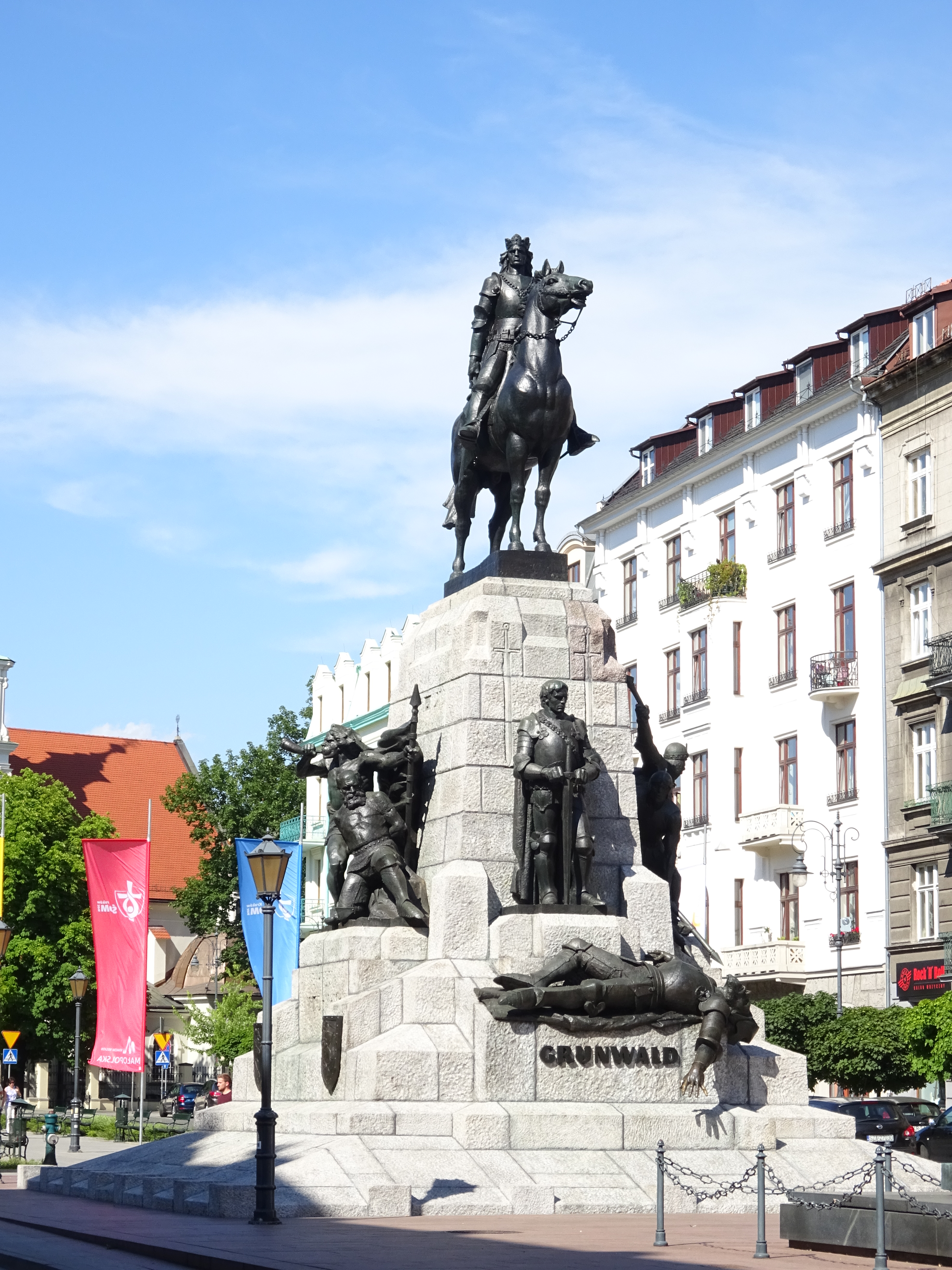
Grunwald Monument was erected in Kraków, Poland for the battle's 500th anniversary. It was destroyed during World War II by the Germans and rebuilt in 1976.

In William Urban's summary, almost all accounts of the battle made before the 1960s were more influenced by romantic legends and nationalistic propaganda than by fact. Historians have since made progress towards dispassionate scholarship and reconciliation of the various national accounts of the battle.

=== Poland and Lithuania ===
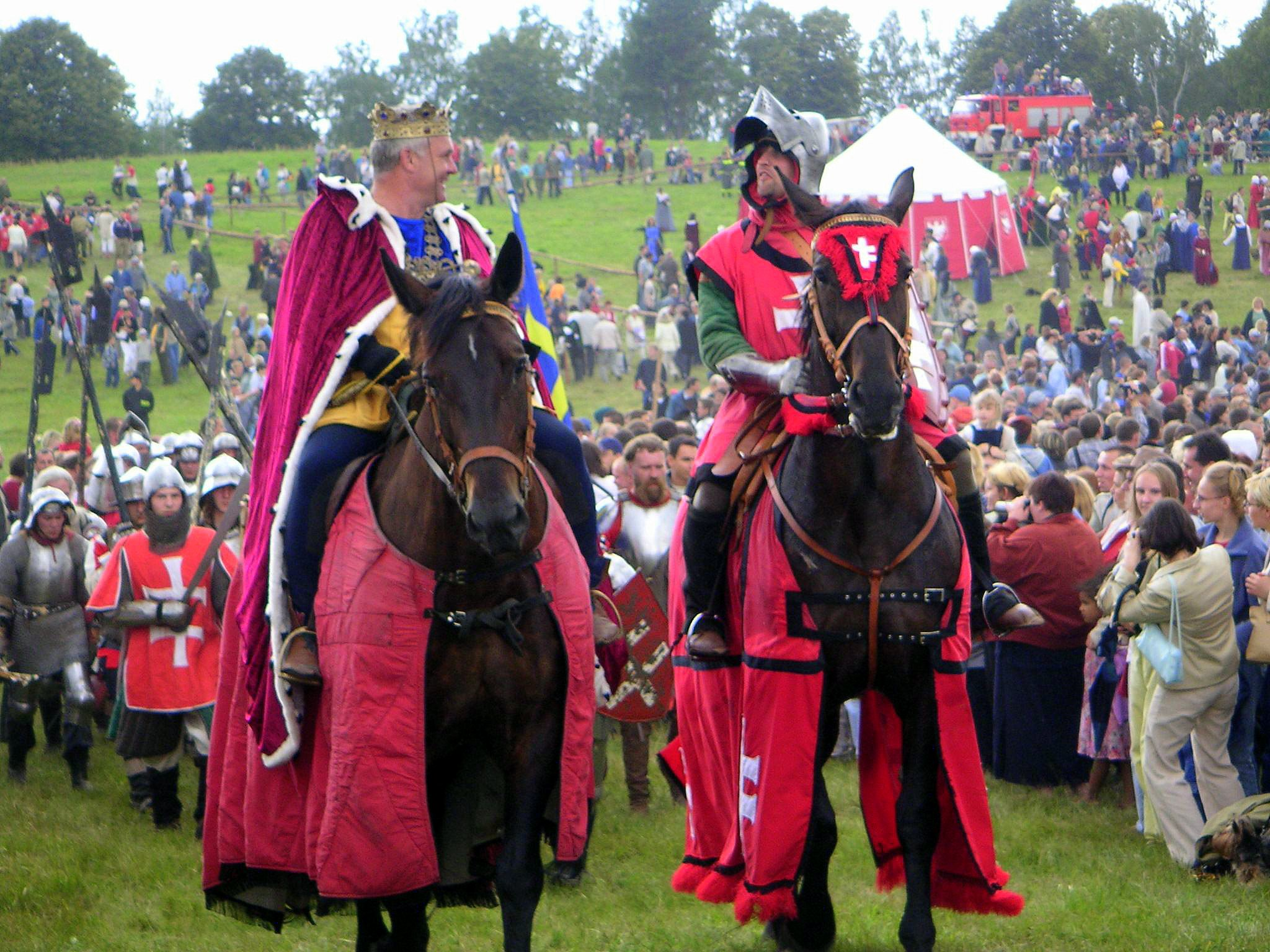
A re-enactor dressed as King Władysław II Jagiełło (left) during the annual recreation of the battle in 2003

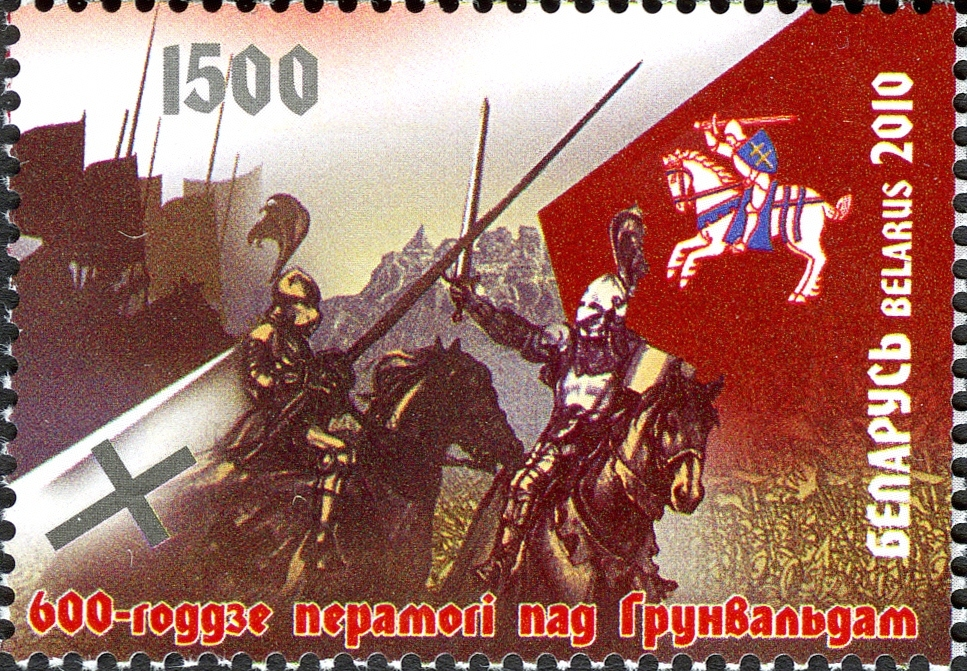
Belarusian stamp for the 600th anniversary of the battle

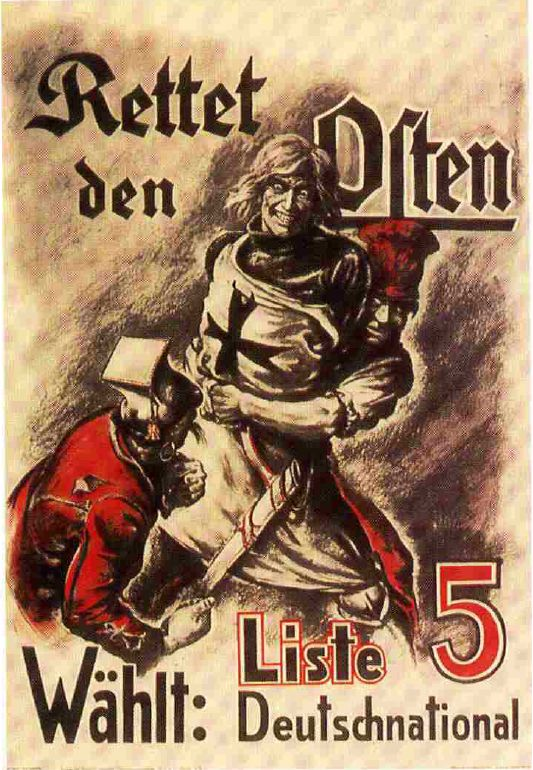
A German National People's Party propaganda poster from 1920 depicts a Teutonic knight threatened by a Pole and a socialist

The Battle of Grunwald is regarded as one of the most important in the history of Poland and Lithuania. In Lithuania, the victory is synonymous with the Grand Duchy's political and military peak. It was a source of national pride during the age of Romantic nationalism and inspired resistance to the Germanization and Russification policies of the German and Russian Empires. The Teutonic Order was portrayed as bloodthirsty invaders and Grunwald as a just victory achieved by a small, oppressed nation.

In 1910, to mark the 500th anniversary of the battle, a monument by Antoni Wiwulski was unveiled in Kraków during a three-day celebration attended by some 150,000 people. About 60 other towns and villages in Galicia also erected Grunwald monuments for the anniversary. About the same time, Nobel Prize-winner Henryk Sienkiewicz wrote the novel The Knights of the Cross (Polish: Krzyżacy), prominently featuring the battle in one of the chapters. In 1960, Polish filmmaker Aleksander Ford used the book as the basis for his film, Knights of the Teutonic Order. At the 1939 New York World's Fair, Poland exhibited the King Jagiello Monument, which commemorated the battle and was later installed in the Central Park, New York City. The battle has lent its name to military decorations (Order of the Cross of Grunwald), sports teams (BC Žalgiris, FK Žalgiris), and various organizations. 72 streets in Lithuania are named after the battle.

Under Communist rule over Poland, the memory of the battle was monopolised by the state. Memory of the battle was instrumentalised for justifying the new borders, under which Poland annexed a quarter of pre-war Germany, while losing the Kresy. Under the new government in the 1970s, anti-German propaganda was reduced, but the symbol of Grunwald did not disappear. Until the end of the 1980s, 15 July was an important official memorial day.

An annual battle re-enactment takes place on 15 July. In 2010, a pageant reenacting the event and commemorating the battle's 600th anniversary was held. It attracted 200,000 spectators who watched 2,200 participants playing the role of knights in a re-enactment of the battle. An additional 3,800 participants played peasants and camp followers. The pageant's organisers believe that the event has become the largest re-enactment of medieval combat in Europe. The reenactment attracts about 60,000 to 80,000 visitors annually.

The battle is also commemorated in Ukraine and Belarus. In 1911, a linden alley known as the Grunwald alley was planted near the Jesuit College in Khyriv to mark the 500th anniversary of the battle. In 2010, the National Bank of Ukraine released a jubilee coin of 20 hryvnia commemorating the 600th anniversary of the battle. At least three cities in Ukraine (Lviv, Drohobych, and Ivano-Frankivsk) have a street named after the battle. In Belarus, interest in the battle began to grow in the late 1980s and early 1990s. In 2010, Belarus issued postage stamps for the 600th anniversary. Since 2008, Our Grunwald Festival has been hosted by a private museum of medieval culture near Minsk and includes battle reenactment.

=== Germany and Russia ===
Germans generally saw the Teutonic knights as heroic and noble men who brought Christianity and civilization to the east, although many came to the region with more material motives. In August 1914, during World War I, Germany won a battle against Russia near the site. When the Germans realised its propaganda potential, they named the battle the Battle of Tannenberg, despite it having actually taken place much closer to Allenstein (Olsztyn), and framed it as revenge for the Polish–Lithuanian victory 504 years earlier. To cement this symbolism, Germany built the Tannenberg Memorial, which became the tomb of the national hero Paul von Hindenburg.

Nazi Germany later exploited the sentiment by portraying their Lebensraum policies as a continuation of the order's historical mission. For example, SS Chief Heinrich Himmler told Nazi Germany's leader Adolf Hitler on the first day of the Warsaw Uprising in August 1944: "After five, six weeks we shall leave. But by then, Warsaw, the capital, the head, the intelligence of this former 16–17 million Polish people will be extinguished, this Volk that has blocked our way to the east for 700 years and has stood in our way ever since the First Battle of Tannenberg."

Due to the participation of the three Smolensk banners, Russians saw the battle as a victory of a Polish–Lithuanian–Russian coalition against invading Germans. However, the ethnic composition of the men under these banners cannot be determined, as Smolensk had rebelled against Vytautas in 1404 and 1408. Chronicler Jan Długosz praised the Smolensk banners, who fought bravely and, according to him, were the only banners from the Grand Duchy of Lithuania not to retreat. In Soviet historiography, the Battle of Grunwald was styled as an ethnic struggle between Slavs and Germans. The Teutonic Order was portrayed as the medieval forerunners of Hitler's armies, while the battle itself was seen as the medieval counterpart to the Battle of Stalingrad.

In 2014, the Russian Military Historical Society stated that Russian troops and their allies defeated the German knights in the Battle of Grunwald. In July 2017, billboards appeared on the streets of Russian cities with statements that seemed to attribute the victory in the battle of Grunwald to Russia.

== Bibliography ==
- Balčiūnas, Andrius (15 July 2020). "Žalgiris, Tannenberg, Grunwald? How to call 1410 Polish–Lithuanian victory against German knights". LRT.lt.
- Baranauskas, Tomas (2011). "Žalgirio mūšis Lietuvos istorikų darbuose" (PDF). Istorija (in Lithuanian). 1 (81). ISSN 1392-0456. Archived from the original (PDF) on 4 June 2019.
- Batūra, Romas (2010). Places of Fighting for Lithuania's Freedom In the Expanse of Nemunas, Vistula and Dauguva rivers (English ed.). Vilnius: The General Jonas Žemaitis Military Academy of Lithuania. ISBN 978-9955-423-91-1. Archived from the original (PDF) on 17 September 2020.
- Bumblauskas, Alfredas (2010). "Žalgiris: neatsakyti klausimai". Lietuvos Istorijos Studijos (in Lithuanian). 26. ISSN 1392-0448.
- Burleigh, Michael (June 1985). "The German Knight: Making of A Modern Myth". History Today. 6 (35). ISSN 0018-2753.
- Christiansen, Eric (1997). The Northern Crusades (2nd ed.). Penguin Books. ISBN 978-0-14-026653-5.
- Dabrowski, Patrice M. (2004). Commemorations and the shaping of modern Poland. Indiana University Press. ISBN 978-0-253-34429-8.
- Davies, Norman (2005). God's Playground. A History of Poland. The Origins to 1795. Vol. I (Revised ed.). Oxford University Press. ISBN 978-0-19-925339-5.
- Ekdahl, Sven (1963). "Die Flucht der Litauer in der Schlacht bei Tannenberg". Zeitschrift für Ostforschung (in German). 1 (12). Archived from the original on 18 July 2011.
- Ekdahl, Sven (2008). "The Battle of Tannenberg-Grunwald-Žalgiris (1410) as reflected in Twentieth-Century monuments". In Mallia-Milanes, Victor (ed.). The Military Orders: History and Heritage. Vol. 3. Ashgate Publishing, Ltd. ISBN 978-0-7546-6290-7.
- Ekdahl, Sven (Summer 2010a). "The Turning Point in the Battle of Tannenberg (Grunwald/Žalgiris) in 1410". Lituanus. 2 (56). ISSN 0024-5089. Archived from the original on 15 August 2016.
- Ekdahl, Sven, ed. (2010b), Das Soldbuch des Deutschen Ordens, Teil. II : Indices mit personengeschichtlichen Kommentaren, Veröffentlichungen aus den Archiven Preußischer Kulturbesitz (in German), Böhlau
- Ekdahl, Sven (2018). "Battlefield Archaeology at Grunwald (Tannenberg, Žalgiris): A Polish-Scandinavian Research Project during the period 2014–2017" (PDF). Przegląd Historyczny. CIX (2). ISSN 0033-2186. Archived from the original (PDF) on 18 September 2021.
- Ekdahl, Sven (2019). "Different points of view on the Battle of Grunwald/Tannenberg 1410 from Poland and Germany and their roots in handwritten and printed traditions" (PDF). Z Badań nad Książką i Księgozbiorami Historycznymi. 13: 41–65. doi:10.33077/uw.25448730.zbkh.2019.157. ISSN 2544-8730.
- Evans, Geoffrey Charles (1970). Tannenberg, 1410–1914. Hamilton. OCLC 468431737.
- Fowler, Jonathan (17 July 2010), Tabards on, visors down: fans relive 1410 Battle of Grunwald, AFP, archived from the original on 21 July 2010
- Frost, Robert (2015). The Oxford History of Poland-Lithuania: The Making of the Polish-Lithuanian Union 1385–1569. Vol. 1. Oxford University Press. ISBN 978-0198208693.
- Ivinskis, Zenonas (1978). Lietuvos istorija iki Vytauto Didžiojo mirties (in Lithuanian). Rome: Lietuvių katalikų mokslo akademija. OCLC 70309981.
- Johnson, Lonnie (1996). Central Europe: Enemies, Neighbors, Friends. Oxford University Press. ISBN 978-0-19-510071-6.
- Jučas, Mečislovas (2009). The Battle of Grünwald. Vilnius: National Museum Palace of the Grand Dukes of Lithuania. ISBN 978-609-95074-5-3.
- Kiaupa, Zigmantas (2002). "Didysis karas su Kryžiuočiais". Gimtoji istorija. Nuo 7 iki 12 klasės (in Lithuanian). Vilnius: Elektroninės leidybos namai. ISBN 978-9986-9216-9-1. Archived from the original on 3 March 2008.
- Kiaupa, Zigmantas; Kiaupienė, Jūratė; Kuncevičius, Albinas (2000). The History of Lithuania Before 1795. Vilnius: Lithuanian Institute of History. ISBN 978-9986-810-13-1.
- Kruczek, Zygmunt (November 2015). "Analysis of Visitor Attendance at Polish Tourism Attractions". Tourism. 25 (1): 47–56. doi:10.2478/tour-2014-0019. hdl:11089/18348. S2CID 130962104.
- Knoll, Paul W. (1983). "In Search of the Battle of Grunwald. Review of Die Schlacht bei Tannenberg 1410, Quellenkritische Untersuchungen, vol. I: Einführung und Quellenlage by S. Ekdahl". The Polish Review. 28 (3): 67–76. JSTOR 25777993.
- Kuczynski, Stephen M. (1960). The Great War with the Teutonic Knights in the years 1409–1411. Ministry of National Defence. OCLC 20499549.
- Mickūnaitė, Giedrė (2006). Making a great ruler: Grand Duke Vytautas of Lithuania. Central European University Press. ISBN 978-963-7326-58-5.
- Odoj, Romuald (2014). "Archäologische Forschungen auf dem Schlachtfeld von Grunwald/Tannenberg (1410)". Fasciculi Archaeologiae Historicae (in German). 27. ISSN 2719-7069.
- Petrauskas, Rimvydas (2010). "Žalgirio mūšis ir lietuvių istorinė tradicija". Naujasis Židinys – Aidai (in Lithuanian). 7–8. ISSN 1392-6845.
- Pelech, Markian (1987). "W sprawie okupu za jeńców krzyżackich z Wielkiej Wojny (1409–1411)". Zapiski Historyczne (in Polish). 2 (52). Archived from the original on 28 September 2011.
- Разин, Е. А. (1999). История военного искусства VI – XVI вв. (in Russian). Vol. 2. Издательство Полигон. ISBN 978-5-89173-041-0.
- Potashenko, Grigoriĭ (2008). Multinational Lithuania: History of Ethnic Minorities. Kaunas: Šviesa. ISBN 9785430052508.
- Rambaud, Alfred Nicolas (1898). History of Russia. Vol. 1. Translated by Leonora B. Lang. New York: Peter Fenelon Collier.
- Richter, Jan (16 July 2010). "Jan Žižka at Grunwald: from mercenary to Czech national hero". Radio Prague.
- Stone, Daniel (2001). The Polish-Lithuanian state, 1386–1795. University of Washington Press. ISBN 978-0-295-98093-5.
- Sužiedėlis, Saulius (2011). "Battle of Grunwald". Historical Dictionary of Lithuania (2nd ed.). Scarecrow Press. ISBN 978-0810849143.
- Sužiedėlis, Simas, ed. (1976). "Tatars". Encyclopedia Lituanica. Vol. V. Boston: Juozas Kapočius. OCLC 95559.
- Symes, Carol (2016). "Medieval Battlefields and National Narratives, 1830–1918". In Plain, Gill (ed.). Myth, Memory, and the First World War in Scotland: The Legacy of Bannockburn. Lewisburg: Bucknell University Press. ISBN 978-1611487763.
- Tanajewski, Dariusz; Odoj, Romuald; Oszczak, Bartlomiej; Godlewska, Patrycja; Grazawski, Kazimierz; Mockun, Slawomir; Drej, Szymon (June 2014). "Ground Penetrating Radar Data Acquisition and Analyses at the Most Holy Trinity Church in Stebark, Poland". 14th SGEM GeoConference on Science and Technologies in Geology, Exploration and Mining. Vol. 1. doi:10.5593/SGEM2014/B11/S5.063. ISBN 978-619-7105-07-0.
- Thompson, James Westfall; Johnson, Edgar Nathaniel (1937). An Introduction to Medieval Europe, 300–1500. W. W. Norton & Company, Inc. OCLC 19683883.
- Turnbull, Stephen (2003). Tannenberg 1410: Disaster for the Teutonic Knights. Campaign Series. Vol. 122. London: Osprey. ISBN 978-1-84176-561-7.
- Urban, William (2003). Tannenberg and After: Lithuania, Poland and the Teutonic Order in Search of Immortality (Revised ed.). Chicago: Lithuanian Research and Studies Center. ISBN 978-0-929700-25-0.
- Gumilev, Lev (2024). от Руси к России [from Rus to Russia] (in Russian). Moscow. ISBN 978-5-17-153493-6.
