= Stębark =

- Village
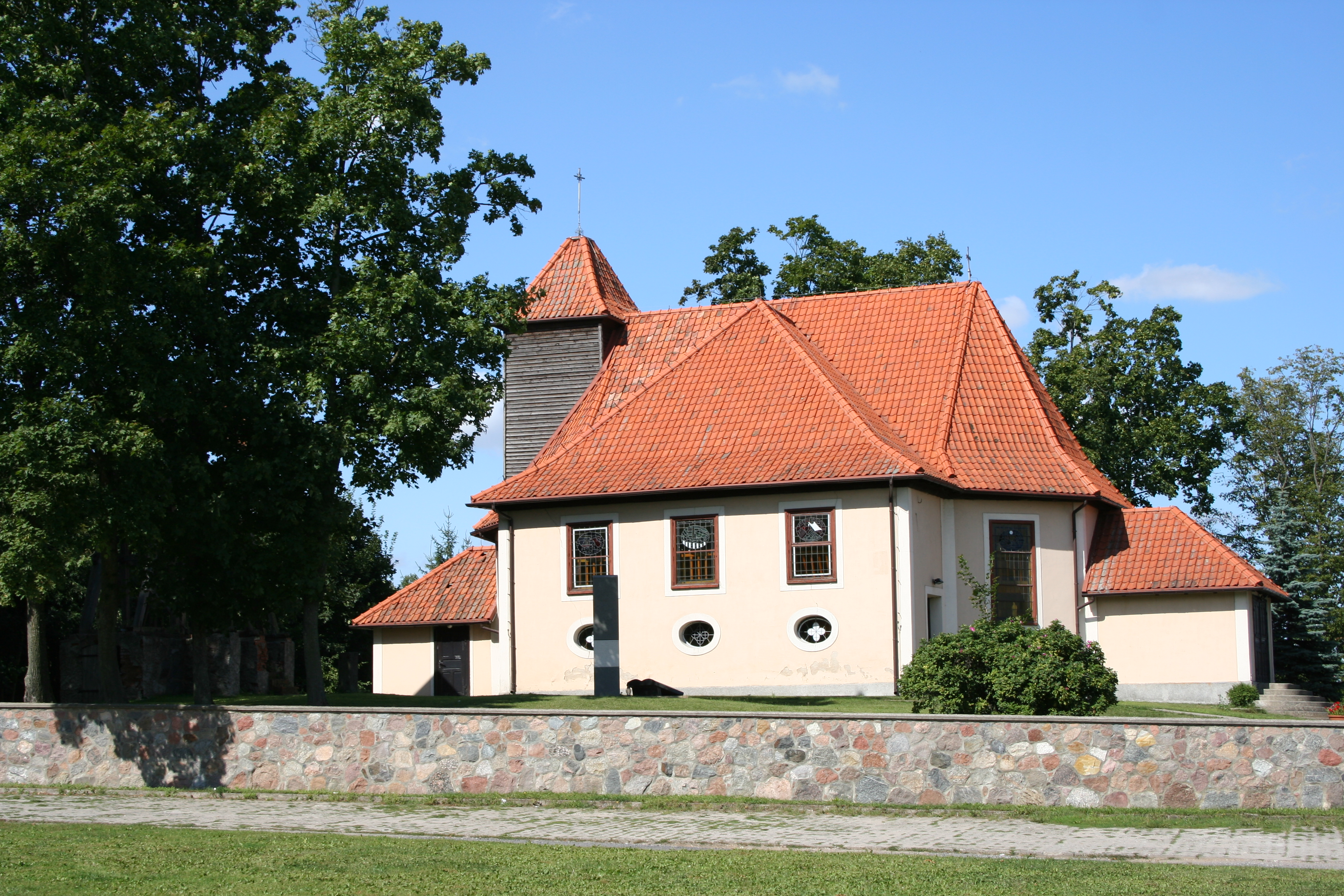
- Holy Trinity Church

- Location within Poland
- Coordinates: 53°30′N 20°8′E
- Country: Poland
- Voivodeship: Warmian-Masurian
- County: Ostróda
- Gmina: Grunwald

Population (2011)
  - Total: 443
- Time zone: UTC+1 (CET)
  - Summer (DST): UTC+2 (CEST)
- Area code: +48 89
- Vehicle registration: NOS
- Website: http://olsztynek.com.pl/

Stębark [ˈstɛmbark] (German: Tannenberg) is a village in the administrative district of Gmina Grunwald, within Ostróda County, Warmian-Masurian Voivodeship, in northern Poland. The village is chiefly known for two historic battles which took place there or nearby: the 1410 Battle of Grunwald and the (Second) Battle of Tannenberg in World War I.

== Geography ==
It is situated on the western edge of the historic Masuria region, southeast of the Dylewska Góra range.

== History ==
The settlement was first mentioned as Tannenberge about 1335, when the area was part of the State of the Teutonic Order. The Old Polish name Sztambark was already documented in 1426.

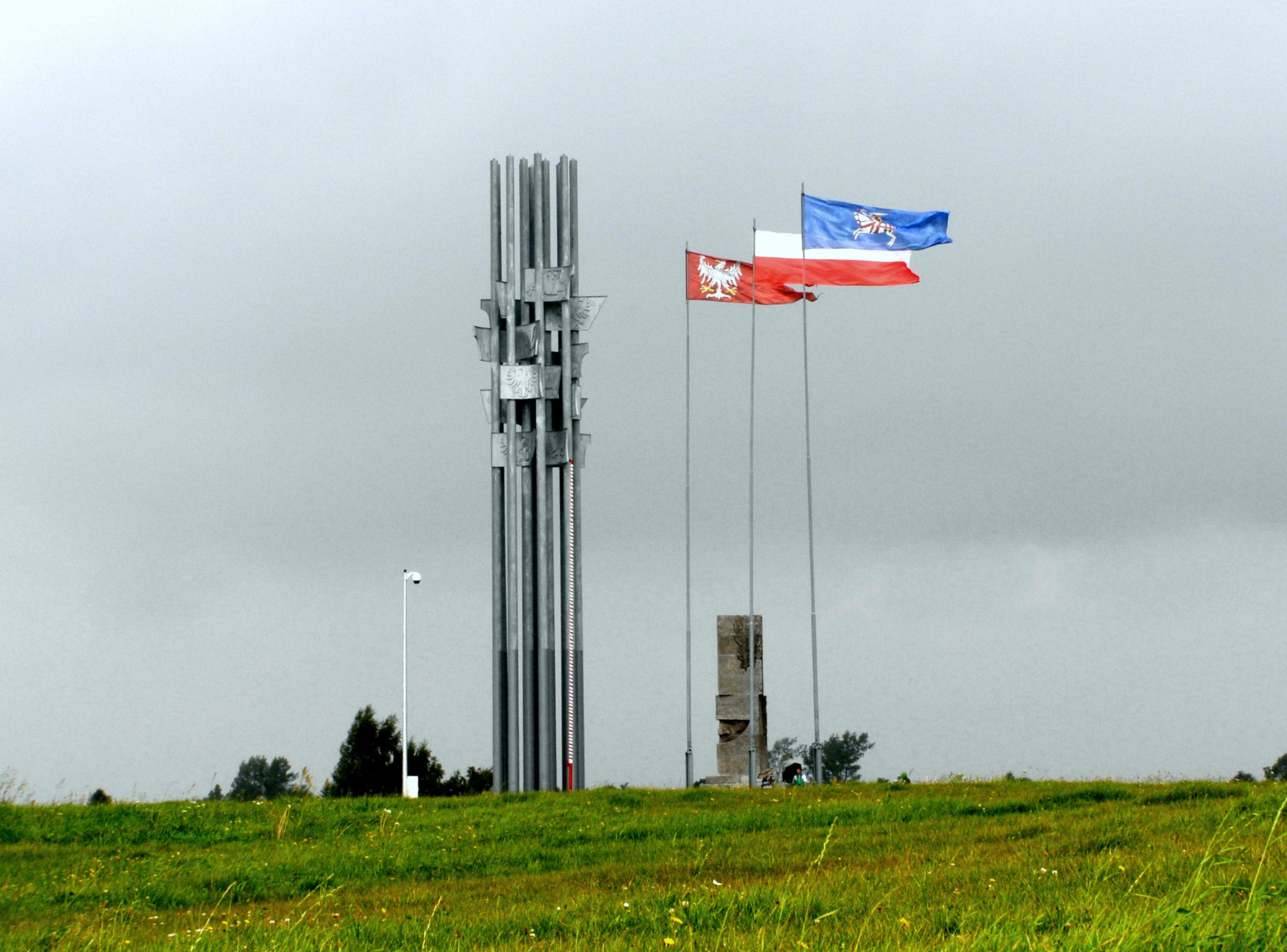
Grunwald memorial

On 15 July 1410 a united army of the Kingdom of Poland and the Grand Duchy of Lithuania led by King Władysław II Jagiełło and Grand Duke Vytautas, with additional mercenary troops from Bohemia, defeated the Teutonic Knights under Grand Master Ulrich von Jungingen in the Battle of Grunwald. The site of the cavalry battle, one of the largest in the whole Middle Ages, was actually the heath between the villages of Tannenberg and neighboring Grünfelde (now, Grunwald), mentioned by King Władysław as "loco conflictus nostri ... dicto Grunenvelt". Adopted as Grunwald by the Polish chronicler Jan Długosz (1415–1480), the battle was called Bitwa pod Grunwaldem in Polish, while German historiography named it Schlacht bei Tannenberg, after the deployment area of the Teutonic troops.

Upon the 1411 Peace of Thorn, the Teutonic Knights had a lady chapel erected at the site, where Ulrich von Jungingen was killed in the battle. In 1454, King Casimir IV Jagiellon incorporated the region to the Kingdom of Poland upon the request of the anti-Teutonic Prussian Confederation. After the subsequent Thirteen Years' War (1454–1466), it became a part of Poland as a fief held by the Teutonic Knights until 1525, and by secular Ducal Prussia afterwards, following the Prussian Homage. As of 1599, the population was almost entirely Polish. Ravaged by Lipka and Crimean Tatar forces during the Deluge of the Second Northern War in 1656, Tannenberg, along with Masuria, became part of the Kingdom of Prussia in 1701.

In 1914 during World War I the German Army under the command of General Paul von Hindenburg won an important victory over the Russian Imperial forces invading East Prussia in the Battle of Tannenberg. The combat lasted from 26 to 30 August and actually included a wide range of battlegrounds centered on Hohenstein (Olsztynek). It was, however, named after nearby Tannenberg by the victorious Germans at Hindenburg's request, for propaganda purposes and to cast it as a kind of revenge for the medieval defeat. In World War II, the Tannenberg myth lent the name to the German Operation Tannenberg extermination actions directed at the Polish people, while the Battle of Tannenberg Line refers to an Eastern Front campaign which took place in Estonia.

In the East Prussian plebiscite of 1920 360 inhabitants voted to remain part of East Prussia and therefore Weimar Germany, none voted for Poland.

After the German defeat in 1945, the region became part of Poland according to the Potsdam Agreement. The remaining German population was expelled, also in accordance with the Potsdam Agreement.

From 1975 to 1998 the village belonged to Olsztyn Voivodeship.

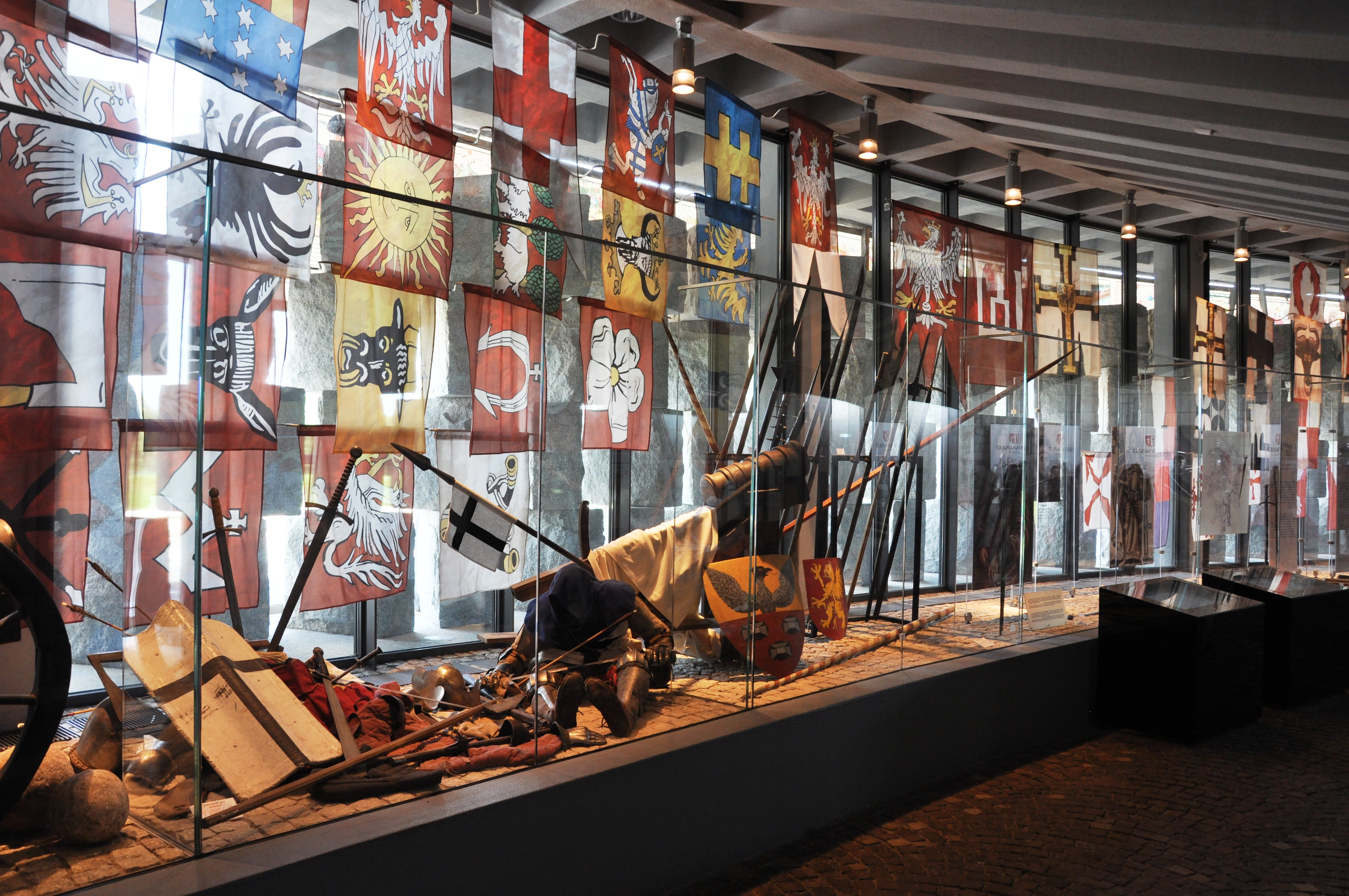
Museum of the Battle of Grunwald

== Sights ==
The main sights of Stębark are the Museum of the Battle of Grunwald and the historic Holy Trinity church. The Grunwald Battlefield is located nearby.
