= Ulrich von Jungingen =

26th Grand Master of the Teutonic Knights (1407–1410)

- Hochmeister
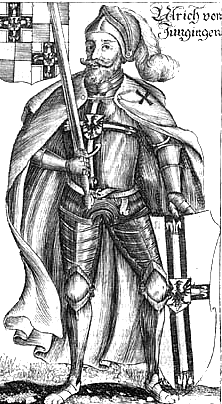
- 17th-century depiction by Christoph Hartknoch

Grand Master of the Teutonic Knights
- Reign: 1407–1410
- Predecessor: Konrad von Jungingen
- Successor: Heinrich von Plauen
- Born: 1360; Hohenfels
- Died: 15 July 1410 (aged 50); Grunwald, State of the Teutonic Order
- Burial: Chapel of St. Anne, Malbork Castle
- House: House of Jungingen

Ulrich von Jungingen (1360 – 15 July 1410) was the 26th Grand Master of the Teutonic Knights, serving from 1407 to 1410. His policy of confrontation with the Grand Duchy of Lithuania and the Kingdom of Poland would spark the Polish–Lithuanian–Teutonic War and lead to disaster for his Order, and his own death, at the Battle of Grunwald.

The coat of arms of Ulrich von Jungingen as the Grand Master of the Teutonic Order

== Life ==
A scion of the Swabian noble house of Jungingen, he was probably born at Hohenfels Castle near Stockach, as the ancestral seat at Jungingen had been devastated in 1311. Ulrich and his elder brother Konrad von Jungingen, as younger sons excluded from succession, took the vow of the Teutonic Knights and moved to the Order's State in Prussia. Ulrich resided in Schlochau (Człuchów) and was Komtur of Balga (1396–1404). His career profited from the patronage of his elder brother Konrad, who was elected Grand Master in 1393. After the Knights had expelled the Victual Brothers from Gotland in 1398, Ulrich distinguished himself in the negotiations for the possession of the island with Queen Margaret I of Denmark, as well as on diplomatic missions to Poland and to Lithuania in connection with the conclusion of the 1398 Treaty of Salynas concerning the Duchy of Samogitia.

In 1404 Ulrich was appointed the Order's Marshal (i.e. military leader) and Komtur of Königsberg. He had to deal with several Samogitian uprisings, which he fought both with strict suppression and bribery of the local nobles. Upon the sudden death of Grand Master Konrad von Jungingen in 1407, Ulrich on 26 June, was chosen for his succession.

Unlike his brother, Ulrich's diplomatic capability was limited. The situation in Samogitia remained tense, incited by Grand Duke Vytautas the Great of Lithuania, who intended to make use of the turmoils to regain the ceded lands. Furthermore, the new Grand Master had inherited the rising conflict with Vytautas' cousin King Jagiełło of Poland over Dobrzyń Land and the pawned Neumark region. The Polish ambassador Archbishop Mikołaj Kurowski declared, that any attack on Lithuania would inevitably entail an armed conflict with Poland. Despite the threat of a two-front war, Ulrich prepared for a preemptive strike. He forged an alliance with King Sigismund of Hungary, levied mercenaries in the Holy Roman Empire, and on 6 August 1409 declared war against Poland.

Though Ulrich received no help from his ally King Sigismund, who was stuck in the conflict with his cousin Jobst of Moravia over the election as King of the Romans, the Order's forces at first successfully campaigned Dobrzyń and Kuyavia and laid siege to Bydgoszcz. Sigismund's brother King Wenceslaus IV of Bohemia arranged a temporary truce and mediated between the belligerents, though without result. On 2 July 1410, the Grand Master at the head of his army left Malbork Castle for the final battle against the united Polish and Lithuanian forces. Both sides met on 15 July between the villages of Grunwald (Grünfelde) and Stębark (Tannenberg). As noontide approached, none of the armies made a move, until Ulrich, according to the annals of Jan Długosz, had two swords delivered to King Jagiełło with the remark that he and Vytautas may live or die by them.

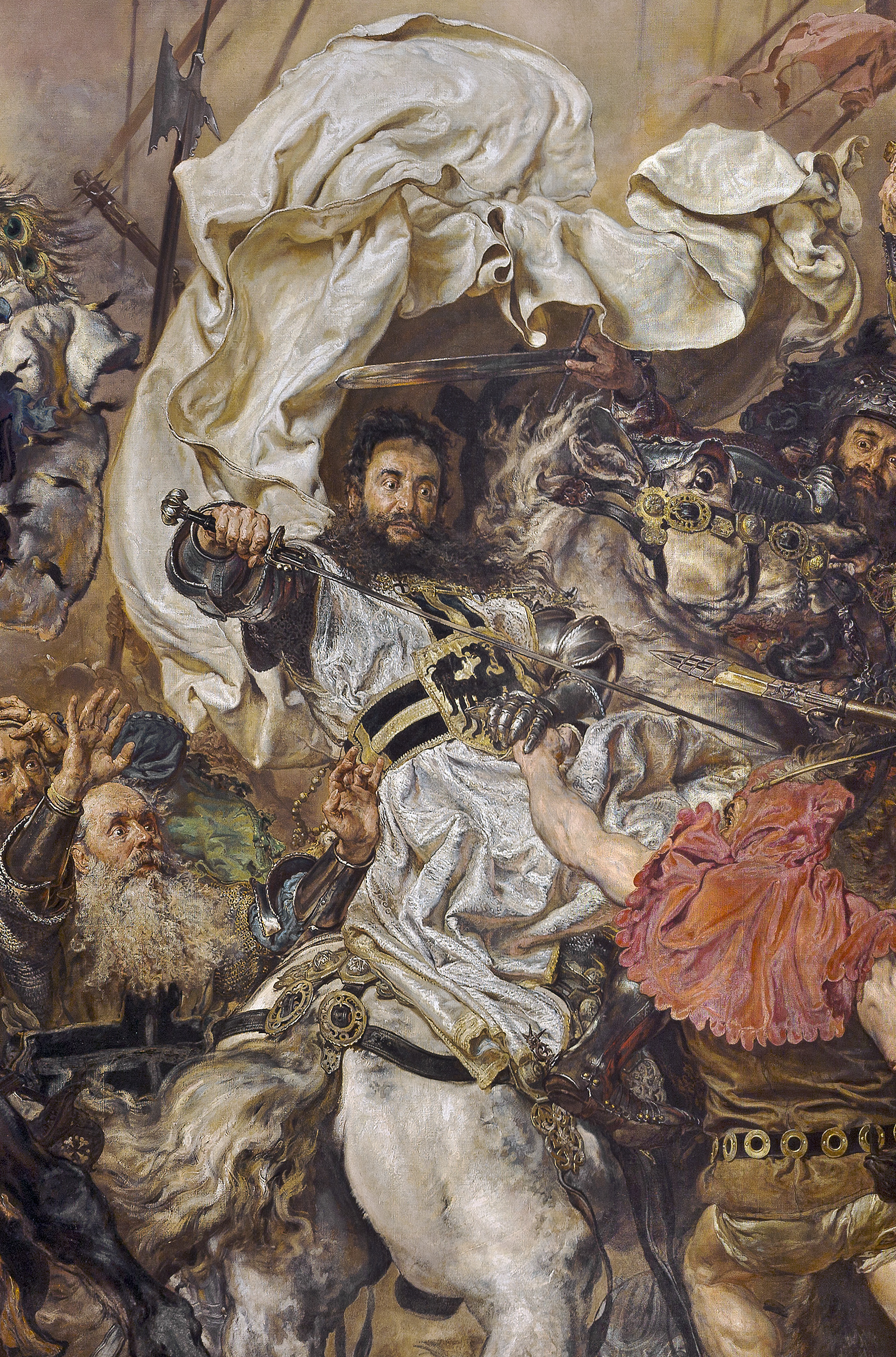
Death of Ulrich von Jungingen, detail of the painting by Jan Matejko, 1878

This act, seen as a bold provocation, sparked the Polish-Lithuanian attack, at first repulsed by the Knights but soon followed by a second strike by Jagiełło's forces. Battle luck changed, after Ulrich, sure of victory, decided to personally lead his remaining regiments against the Polish troops. He nearly got hold of the king, but at the same time lost oversight of the Order's military operations. After the allied Prussian forces of the Lizard Union under Nicholas von Renys broke away, the Grand Master had to face the superior numbers of the Polish-Lithuanian union. When the Lithuanians attacked him from the rear, Ulrich's troops were routed and he himself was killed in action. According to Polish chronicler Jan Długosz he was met and defeated by the Polish knight Mszczuj of Skrzynno. King Jagiełło arranged the transportation of his body to Malbork Castle before he began the Siege of Marienburg.

== Legacy ==
Based on Długosz's description, later generations have imputed Ulrich von Jungingen with hot-bloodedness and arrogance. The painting Battle of Grunwald by Jan Matejko supposedly illustrates the moment when Ulrich, dressed in white with a black cross, trying to attack Grand Duke Vytautas, is killed by two Polish infantrymen, equipped with an executioner's axe and a replica of the Holy Lance reminiscent of the Congress of Gniezno. The tradition was resumed by Henryk Sienkiewicz in his 1900 novel The Knights of the Cross, originally modeled on the measures of the Russian occupants in Vistula Land, describing Ulrich as an impulsive and aggressive commander. The book was made into a film by Aleksander Ford in 1960. On the other hand, 19th century German historiography portrayed Ulrich as a man of chivalric virtues, who succumbed to the cunning of his enemies, as rendered by the author Ernst Wichert in his novel Heinrich von Plauen.

Ulrich's successor Heinrich von Plauen had a lady chapel erected on the former battlefield in 1413, which was probably destroyed by Lipka Tatar or Crimean Tatar forces campaigning in the region in 1656. In 1901 a glacial erratic (Jungingenstein), commemorating a "hero's death in the struggle for German spirit and German law", was set up at the behest of the German authorities in East Prussia. The stone is still in its place but has toppled over with the result that the inscription is no longer readable. A more recent second memorial stone nearby marks the place of Jungingen's death ("Miejsce śmierci Wielkiego Mistrza Ulricha von Jungingena"). The surrounding area is today the site of an annual historical reenactment.

== Literature ==
- Maschke, Die Hochmeister des Deutschen Ordens
- Maschke, Domus Hospitalis Theutonicorum
- Zimmerling, Der Deutsche Ritterorden
- Sonthofen, Der deutsche Orden
- Markov, Helmert: Schlachten der Weltgeschichte

Grand Master of the Teutonic Order
| Preceded by Konrad von Jungingen | Hochmeister; 1407–1410 | Succeeded by Heinrich von Plauen |
