= William Urban =

American historian (born 1939)

- Born: 1939 (age 86–87)
- Occupation: Professor
- Known for: Research in Baltic Crusades
- Awards: Harry E. Pratt Memorial Prize for the best article on Illinois History in 1997, The Illinois Historical Society, Dec. 4, 1998. Vitols Award for the best article of 1998 in the Journal of Baltic Studies (2000).

Academic background
- Education: University of Texas as Austin

William Urban is an American historian specializing in the Baltic Crusades and Teutonic knights. He is the Lee L. Morgan Professor of History and International studies at Monmouth College. He served as an editor for the Journal of Baltic Studies from 1990 to 1994.

He is the author of two books and numerous articles in academic journals.

Prior to beginning his teaching career at Monmouth College in 1966, he taught as an assistant professor at the University of Kansas 1965–1966. He completed his undergraduate and graduate studies at the University of Texas at Austin.

== Selected Bibliography ==
- "Reflections on the Process of Transition 1919–1922 and 1989–1922", Lituanus, 49:1 (2003): 39–47. <https://www.lituanus.org/wp-content/uploads/2025/01/2-Reflections-on-the-Process-of-Transition-1919-1922-and-1989-1992-William-Urban.pdf>
- Tannenberg and After. Lithuania, Poland, and the Teutonic Order in Search of Immortality (Chicago, Illinois: Lithuanian Research and Studies Center, 1999) ISBN 0-9297-0025-2
  - reviewed by Paul W. Knoll in The Catholic Historical Review 90:3 (July 2004): 536-537. <10.1353/cat.2004.0136>
- The Prussian Crusade (Chicago, Illinois: Lithuanian Research and Studies Center, 1980; second ed., 2000). ISBN 0-9297-0028-7
- "Victims of the Baltic Crusade," Journal of Baltic Studies 29:3 (1998): 195–212. <https://doi.org/10.1080/01629779800000071>.
- "Renaissance Humanism in Prussia: Copernicus, Humanist Politician" Journal of Baltic Studies 22:3 (1991): 195–232 <https://doi.org/10.1080/01629779100000101>
- "Roger Bacon and the Teutonic Knights," Journal of Baltic Studies 19:4 (1988): 363–370. <https://doi.org/10.1080/01629778800000251>
- The Baltic Crusade. DeKalb: Northern Illinois University Press, 1975, second ed., 1994. ISBN 0-9297-0010-4 <https://prussia.online/Data/Book/th/the-baltic-crusade-2/Urban%20W.%20The%20Baltic%20Crusade%20(1994),%20OCR.pdf>
- "The Origin of the Livonian War 1558," Lituanus 29:3 (1983): 11–25. <http://www.lituanus.org/1983_3/83_3_02.htm >
- "The correct translation of “Ruce”, Journal of Baltic Studies 13:1 (1982): 12–18. <https://doi.org/10.1080/01629778200000021>
- "Redating the Expedition of Anno of Sangerhausen to Sambia," Journal of Baltic Studies 7:4 (1976): 320–329. <https://doi.org/10.1080/01629777600000321>
- "The Preussian-Lithuanians Frontier of 1242," Lituanus 21:4 (1975): 5–18. <https://www.lituanus.org/wp-content/uploads/2025/01/1-The-Prussian-Lithuanian-Frontier-of-1242-William-Urban.pdf>
