= Stefan Maria Kuczyński =

Polish historian and academic

Stefan Maria Kuczyński, pen name Włodzimierz Bart (21 September 1904 – 30 March 1985), was a Polish historian and academic specializing in the medieval history of the Kingdom of Poland during the Piast dynasty and the Jagiellon dynasty, especially in the period of King Władysław II Jagiełło.

== Life and career ==
Kuczyński was born on 21 September 1904 in Borysław, Volhynia. After World War II he served as docent at the Jagiellonian University (1945), then associate professor of University of Wrocław (1946), followed by professor of University of Łódź (1954–1969), and professor of University of Silesia in Katowice (1969–1982). Kuczyński also served as editor-in-chief of illustrated monthly Śląsk in 1946–1948, published in Jelenia Góra, and the scientific journal Nauka i Sztuka, one of the first of its kind in postwar Poland.

Kuczyński studied philology, law and history in the Second Polish Republic at the University of Warsaw, and received a doctorate in 1932 for his work Rządy litewskie na Siewierszczyźnie w II połowie XIV wieku, under the direction of Oskar Halecki. He worked first as high-school teacher in Warsaw and later as lecturer at his own alma mater since 1937 (until the invasion of Poland), with the title of docent at the Institute of Medieval History. During the occupation of Poland he took part in clandestine Tajne komplety.

== Publications ==
=== Scientific works ===
- Sine wody, Warsaw: skł. gł. "Libraria Nova" 1935.
- Ziemie Czernihowsko-Siewierskie pod rządami Litwy, Warsaw: zasiłek Funduszu Kultury Narodowej 1936. Prace Ukraińskiego Instytutu Naukowego. Serja Prac Komisji dla Badań Zagadnień Polsko-Ukraińskich; z. 2
- Kto dowodził w bitwie pod Grunwaldem, Jelenia Góra 1947 (Odbitka: z kwartalnika "Nauka i Sztuka" t. 5).
- Śląsk Dolny w drugą rocznicę powrotu do Polski 1945-1947, 1947.
- O powstaniu wzmianki z r. 981 w "Powieści z lat doczesnych", Wrocław: Wrocławskie Towarzystwo Naukowe 1955. Seria: Sprawozdania Wrocławskiego Towarzystwa Naukowego 8.
- Rozbiór krytyczny roku 1385 "Dziejów polskich" Jana Długosza, Warsaw 1958.
- Grunwald 1410-1960, Olsztyn: "Pojezierze", 1959.
- Grunwald, Warsaw: "Arkady" 1960.
- Bitwa pod Grunwaldem, Katowice: "Śląsk" 1987, ISBN 8321605087
- Król Jagiełło ok. 1351–1434, Warsaw: Wydawnictwo Ministerstwa Obrony Narodowej 1985, ISBN 831107092X (wyd. 2 1987).
- Wielka wojna z Zakonem Krzyżackim w latach 1409–1411, Warsaw 1980, ISBN 8311062625 (wyd. 4 popr.)
- Lata wojny trzynastoletniej w "Rocznikach, czyli kronikach" inaczej "Historii polskiej" Jana Długosza, t.1-2, Łódź: Łódzkie Towarzystwo Wydawnicze 1964-1965.
- Miechowita jako historyk, Warsaw: Państwowe Wydawnictwa Naukowe 1965.
- Sienkiewicz a współczesna historiografia polska, Warsaw 1966.
- Rzeczywistość historyczna w "Krzyżakach" Henryka Sienkiewicza, Warsaw: Państ. Instytut Wydawniczy 1967.
- Karol Szajnocha, Jadwiga i Jagiełło 1374-1413. Opowiadanie historyczne, t.1-2, wstęp: Stefan M. Kuczyński, Warsaw: Państwowy Instytut Wydawniczy 1969.
- Spór o Grunwald, Warsaw: MON 1972.
- Studia z dziejów Europy Wschodniej X-XVII w., Warsaw: Państwowe Wydawnictwo Naukowe 1965.

=== Historical novels ===
- Litwin i Andegawenka: powieść historyczna, Katowice: "Śląsk" 1974.
- Zawisza Czarny: powieść historyczna, Katowice 1980, ISBN 8321600549
- Pierścień z szafirem. Opowieść o Macieju z Miechowa, Warsaw: "Nasza Księgarnia" 1962.
- Grunwaldzkie miecze. Powieść historyczna dla młodzieży, Warsaw: Ludowa Spółdzielnia Wydawnicza 1966.
- Warneńczyk Warsaw: Ludowa Spółdzielnia Wydawnicza 1968.
- Przygody Kołatka Warsaw: Ludowa Spółdzielnia Wydawnicza 1970.
