= Łodwigowo =

- Village
- Location within Poland
- Coordinates: 53°28′13″N 20°07′14″E
- Country: Poland
- Voivodeship: Warmian-Masurian
- County: Ostróda
- Gmina: Grunwald

Population
  - Total: 420
- Time zone: UTC+1 (CET)
  - Summer (DST): UTC+2 (CEST)
- Postal code: 14-107
- Vehicle registration: NOS

Łodwigowo [wɔdviˈɡɔvɔ] (also referred to as Ludwikowice; Ludwigsdorf) is a village in the administrative district of Gmina Grunwald, within Ostróda County, Warmian-Masurian Voivodeship, in northern Poland. It is located in the historic region of Masuria.

== History ==
The village surely existed in the 14th century. It is close to the site of the Battle of Grunwald (1410), which is commemorated by a museum and memorial site. It was devastated during the Polish-Teutonic wars, and then resettled by Polish people.
