= Grunwald, Warmian–Masurian Voivodeship =

Grunwald
- Village
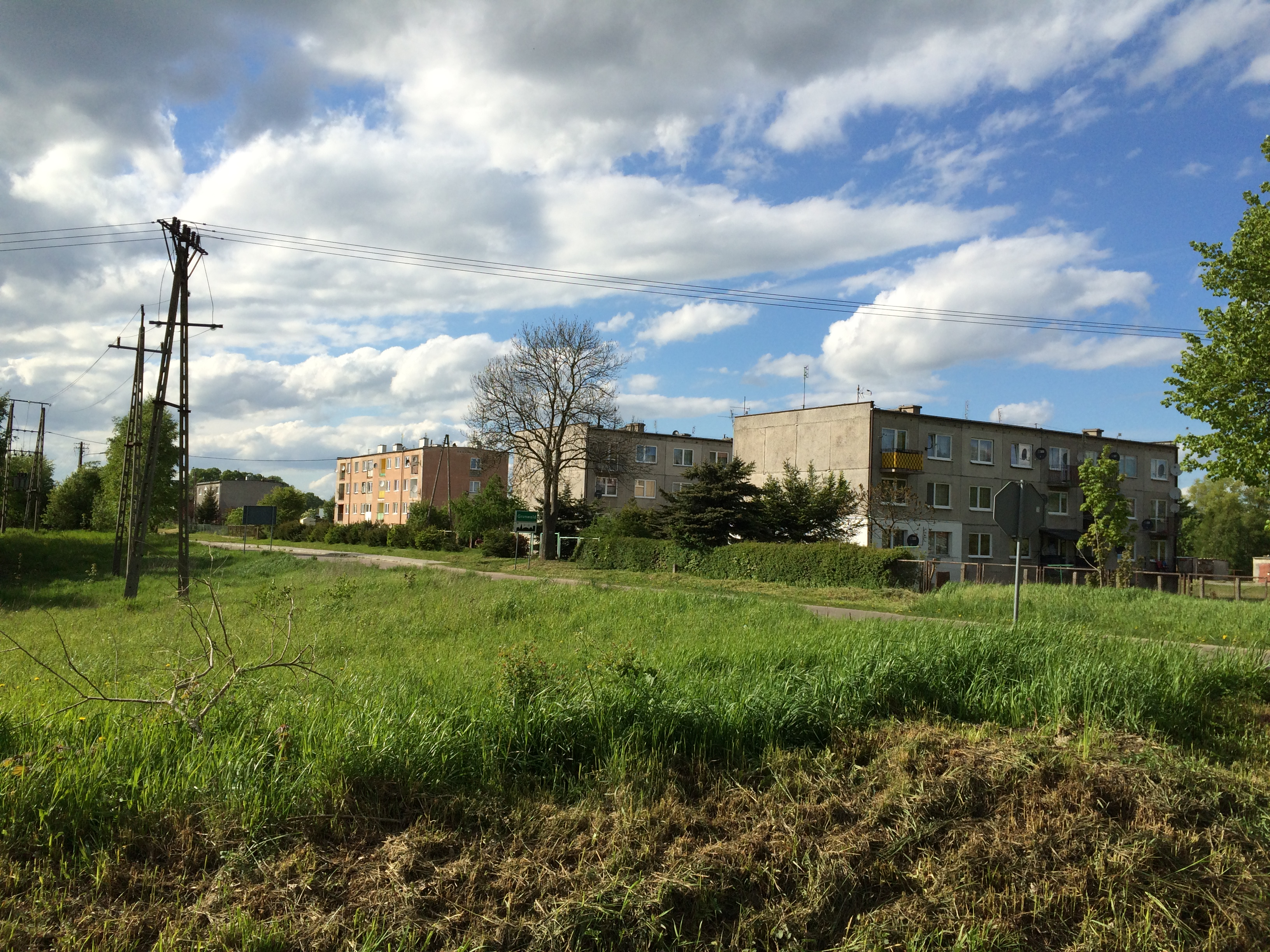

- Location within Poland
- Coordinates: 53°29′09″N 20°05′31″E
- Country: Poland
- Voivodeship: Warmian-Masurian
- County: Ostróda
- Gmina: Grunwald
- Population (2011): 417
- Time zone: UTC+1 (CET)
  - Summer (DST): UTC+2 (CEST)
- Postal code: 14-110
- Area code: +48 89
- Vehicle registration: NOS

Historic Monument of Poland
- Designated: 2010-09-17
- Part of: Grunwald – Battlefield
- Reference no.: Dz. U., 2010, vol. 184, No. 1235

Grunwald [ˈɡrunvalt] is a village in the administrative district of Gmina Grunwald, within Ostróda County, Warmian-Masurian Voivodeship, in northern Poland. The village, Grünfelde until 1945, is chiefly known for a medieval battle, the 1410 Battle of Grunwald (or Tannenberg) between Polish-Lithuanian and Teutonic Knights forces.

== Geography ==
It is located within the historic region of Masuria.

== History ==
On 15 July 1410, the Battle of Grunwald was fought near the village (in the direction of the Stębark/Tannenberg village). In it, Polish–Lithuanian forces commanded by King Władysław II Jagiełło defeated the Teutonic Knights. It was one of the largest battles in medieval Europe and one of the most important and magnificent victories in the history of Poland and Lithuania. The Grunwald Battlefield, listed as a Historic Monument of Poland, is located nearby. Festivities and battle reenactments take place every year on the battle anniversary.

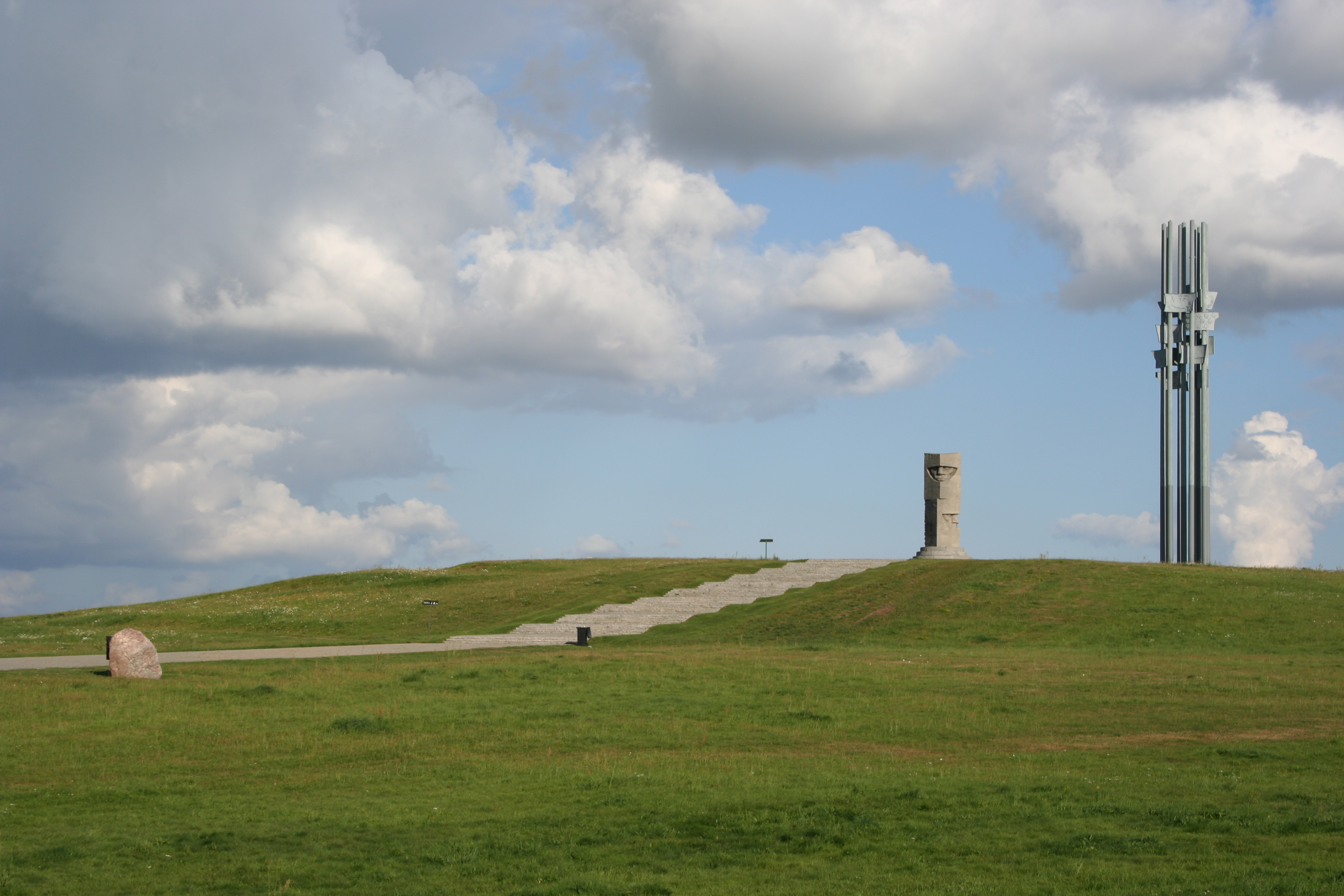
Grunwald Battlefield

After the battle, the King of Poland, Władysław II Jagiełło, intended to erect a chapel on the battlefield at "loco conflictus nostri ... dicto Grunenvelt". Despite the Polish–Lithuanian victory in the battle and the war, the battle site initially remained under the control of the Teutonic Order, which built a chapel dedicated to Mary instead. In 1454, King Casimir IV Jagiellon incorporated the region to the Kingdom of Poland upon the request of the anti-Teutonic Prussian Confederation. After the subsequent Thirteen Years' War (1454–1466), it became a part of Poland as a fief held by the Teutonic Knights. The village was mentioned in the 15th-century Latin chronicles as Grunenvelt. Chronicler Jan Długosz (1415 – 1480, known in Latin as Johannes Longinus) used the Polish name Grunwald, and that name was used in Polish historiography since.

After the defeat of Nazi Germany in World War II, in accordance to the Potsdam Agreement, the village Grünfelde became again part of Poland. A museum and memorial site are located in the fields where the battle was fought, roughly in the middle of a triangle, with Stębark and Łodwigowo.
