= Subdivisions of the Kingdom of Galicia and Lodomeria =

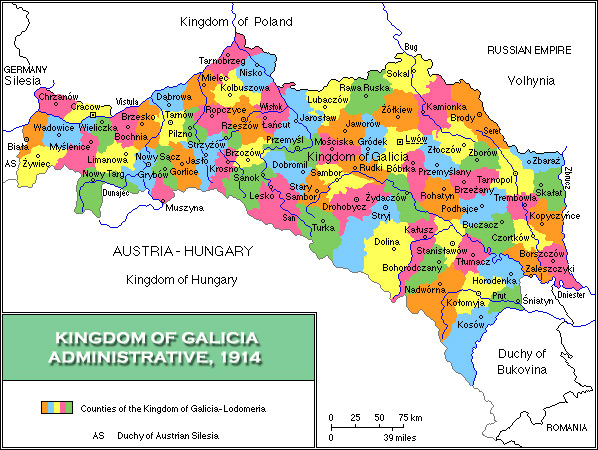
Administrative districts of Galicia in 1914

Subdivisions of the Kingdom of Galicia and Lodomeria were administrative units of the Kingdom of Galicia and Lodomeria, a crown land of the Habsburg Monarchy (1772-1918). During the early period (1772-1804), and within the Austrian Empire (1804-1867), the kingdom was divided into Kreise since the late 18th century, which from 1854 were subdivided into Bezirke (referred to as Amtsbezirke ('office districts'), to distinguish them from other types of Bezirk). During the later period, within and Austria-Hungary (1867-1918), the Kingdom was subdivided into political districts (German: Bezirkshauptmannschaften) for administrative purposes, which were referred to in Polish as powiaty (administrative counties). When they were introduced in 1867 there were 74 of these administrative counties; in 1900 there were 78 counties. The administrative counties were responsible for storing vital records. These counties were introduced following the 1867 December Constitution.

The Kingdom of Galicia and Lodomeria was the largest and most populous crown land of Cisleithania (i.e. the non-Hungarian parts of the Habsburg realms) between 1772 and 1918. More widely, the central European region of Galicia is today split between the modern states of Poland and Ukraine. Despite having passed through several intermediate states during the great wars of the 20th century, the regions have mainly preserved their territorial integrity and continue to demarcate the jurisdiction of local government authorities in their successor states.

== Kreise (until 1865) ==
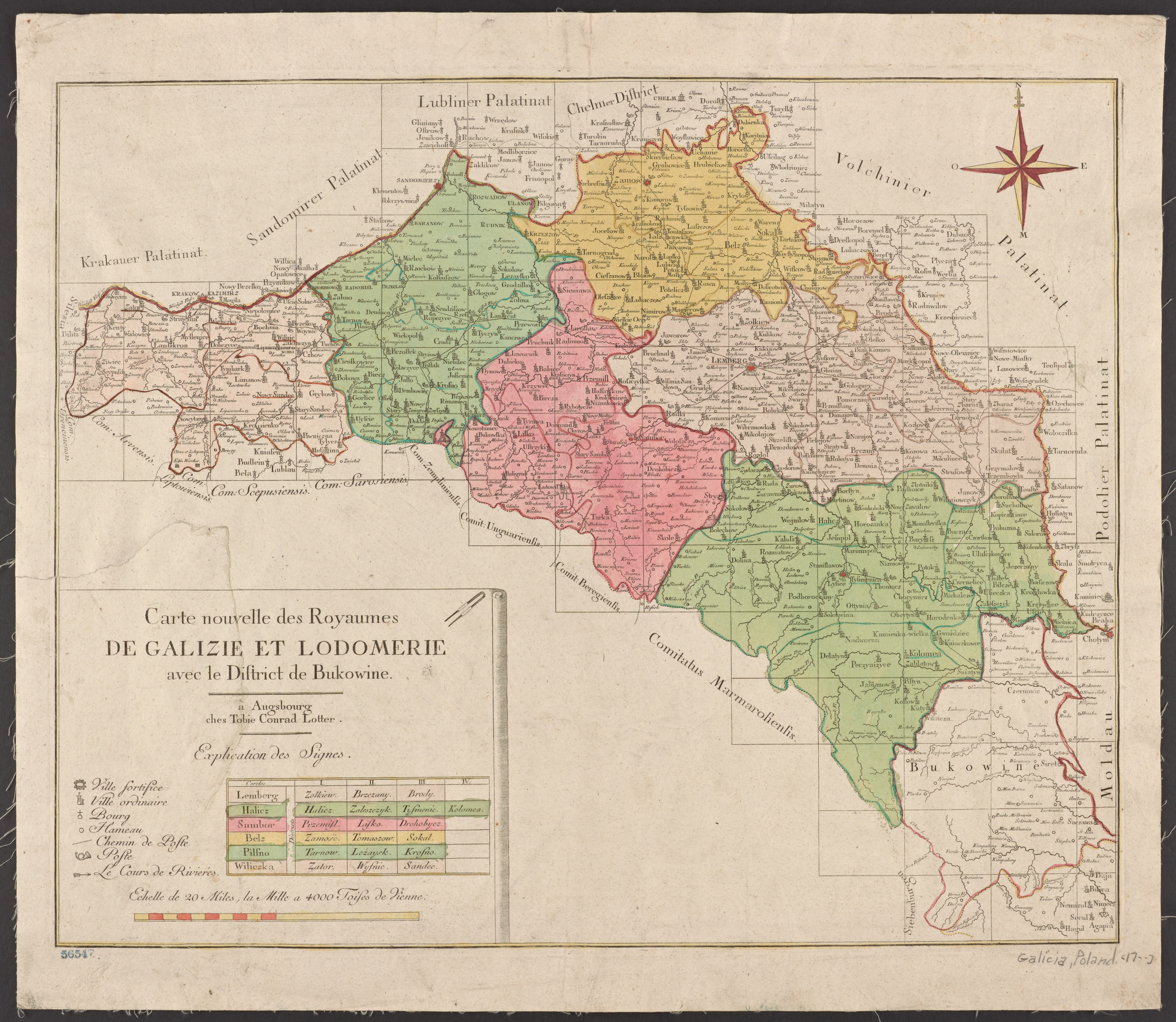
A map showing the Kreise and Kreisdistrikte of Galicia and Lodomeria 1777–82

The Kreise (lit. 'circles'; sing. Kreis; Polish: cyrkuły, sing. cyrkuł; Ukrainian: округи okruhy, sing. округ okruh) of Galicia and Lodomeria go back in some form to the aftermath of the First Partition of Poland in 1772 which led to the Kingdom's creation, but did not take something resembling their final form until 1782. They were (generally) named after their capital/seat; usually this would take the form [genitival adjectival form of the name] Kreis (usually simply [Name]er Kreis e.g. Lemberger Kreis from Lemberg, the German name for Lviv), but Kreis [standard form of the name] (e.g. Kreis Lemberg) was also used, especially later, and the two forms were interchangeable.

At first, Galicia and Lodomeria was divided into six large circles (Kreise), named after major centers (Belz, Halych, Lviv, Pilzno, Sambir, Wieliczka), which were subdivided into 59 Kreisdistrikte ('circle districts') in 1773. In 1775 the number of Kreisdistrikte was reduced to 19.

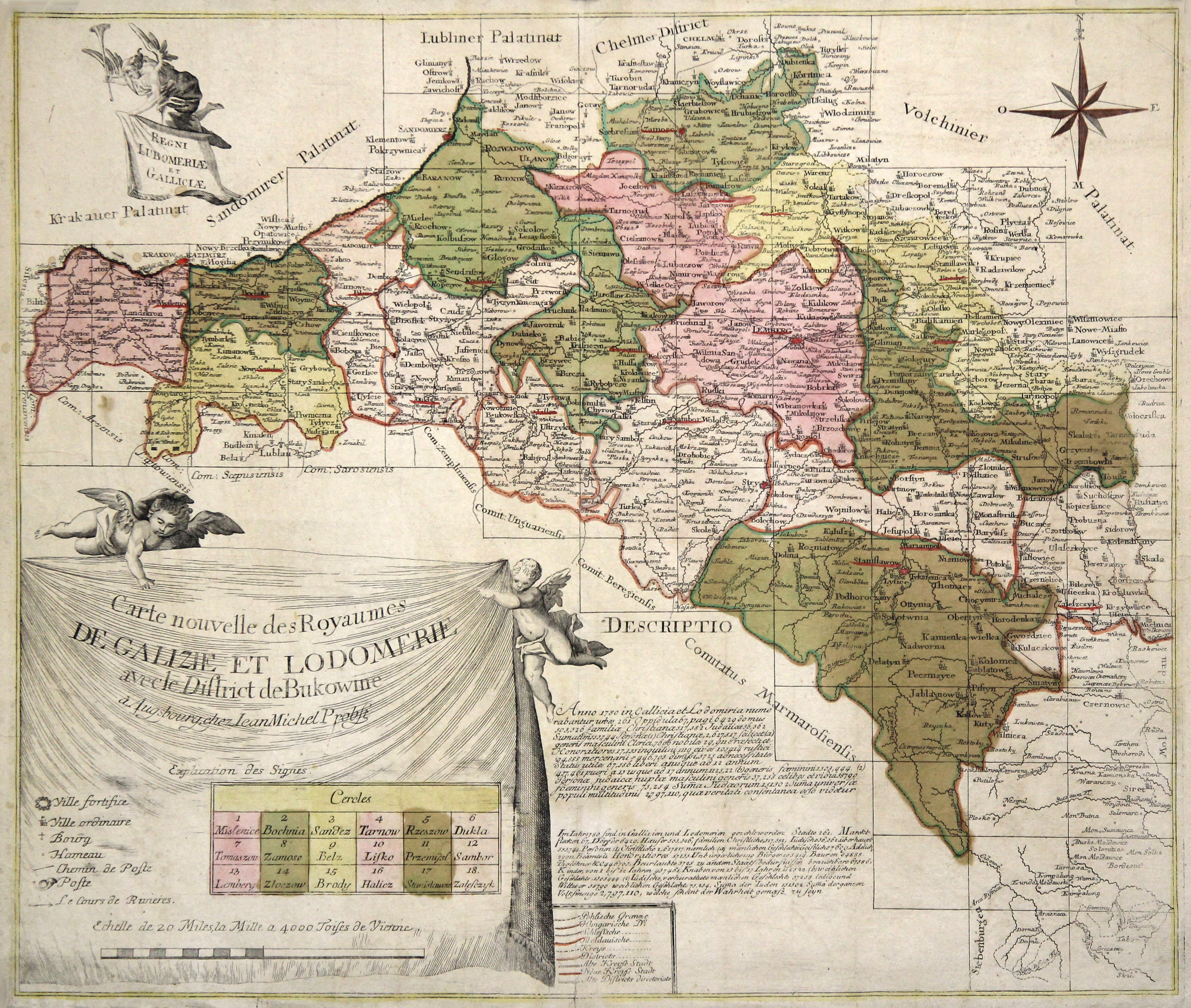
The 18 Kreise of Galicia and Lodomeria c. 1782.

In 1782 the two-level system was abolished and Galicia and Lodomeria was divided into 18 Kreise of the type used in the other non-Hungarian Habsburg realms (what would later be called Cisleithania). Over the next decade these would mostly take the forms which would persist until the mid-19th century.

As the border of Galicia and Lodomeria itself, the Vistula formed the northern borders of the Myslenicer, Bochnier, Tarnower and (partially) Rzeszower Kreise.

The Bukowiner Kreis (an exception where the name derives from the region, although it was also known as Czernowitzer Kreis) was added to Galicia and Lodomeria in 1786, having previously been a separate military district.

By the 1790s the Kreise were:

- Myślenicer Kreis
- Bochnier Kreis
- Sandecer Kreis
- Tarnower Kreis
- Dukler Kreis
- Rzeszower Kreis
- Przemysler Kreis
- Sanoker Kreis
- Samborer Kreis
- Zamoscer Kreis
- Zołkiewer Kreis
- Lemberger Kreis
- Broder/Złozower Kreis
- Brzeczaner Kreis
- Tarnopoler Kreis
- Stryer Kreis
- Stanislauer Kreis
- Zalestschyker Kreis
- Czernowitzer/Bukowiner Kreis

In 1791 the Dukler Kreis had become the Jasłoer Kreis when its capital moved there.

The lands gained by the Habsburgs in the 1795 Third Partition of Poland became West (or New) Galicia, a separate part of the kingdom. It too was divided into Kreise. The area around Krakau on the right (southern) bank of the Vistula was transferred to the Krakauer Kreis. West Galicia was incorporated into Galicia-proper in 1803 as a semi-autonomous region.

West Galicia was largely bounded by the Vistula, Bug and Pilica rivers. The Vistula also formed the eastern border of the Radomer Kreis, the western border of the Josefower and Wiazownaer Kreise, the eastern and southern border of the Opatower Kreis, the southern border of the Stopnicer Kreis and part of those of the Slomniker and Krakauer Kreise.

The West Galician Kreise c. 1803:

- Krakauer Kreis (Kraków)
- Slomniker Kreis (Słomniki)
- Stopnicer Kreis (Stopnica)
- Opatower Kreis (Opatów; before 1789: Kreis Sandomierz)
- Konskier Kreis (Końskie)
- Radomer Kreis (Radom)
- Jozefower Kreis (Józefów)
- Lubliner Kreis (Lublin)
- Chełmer Kreis (or Chelmer Kreis) (Chełm)
- Bialer Kreis (Biała Podlaska)
- Siedlcer Kreis (Siedlce)
- Wiazown(a)er Kreis (earlier: Kreis Mińsk)

Sometimes the Myślenicer, Bochnier and Sandecer Kreise from the first partition were considered as a part of West Galicia. In this configuration, the crownland overlapped heavily with the historical Lesser Poland.

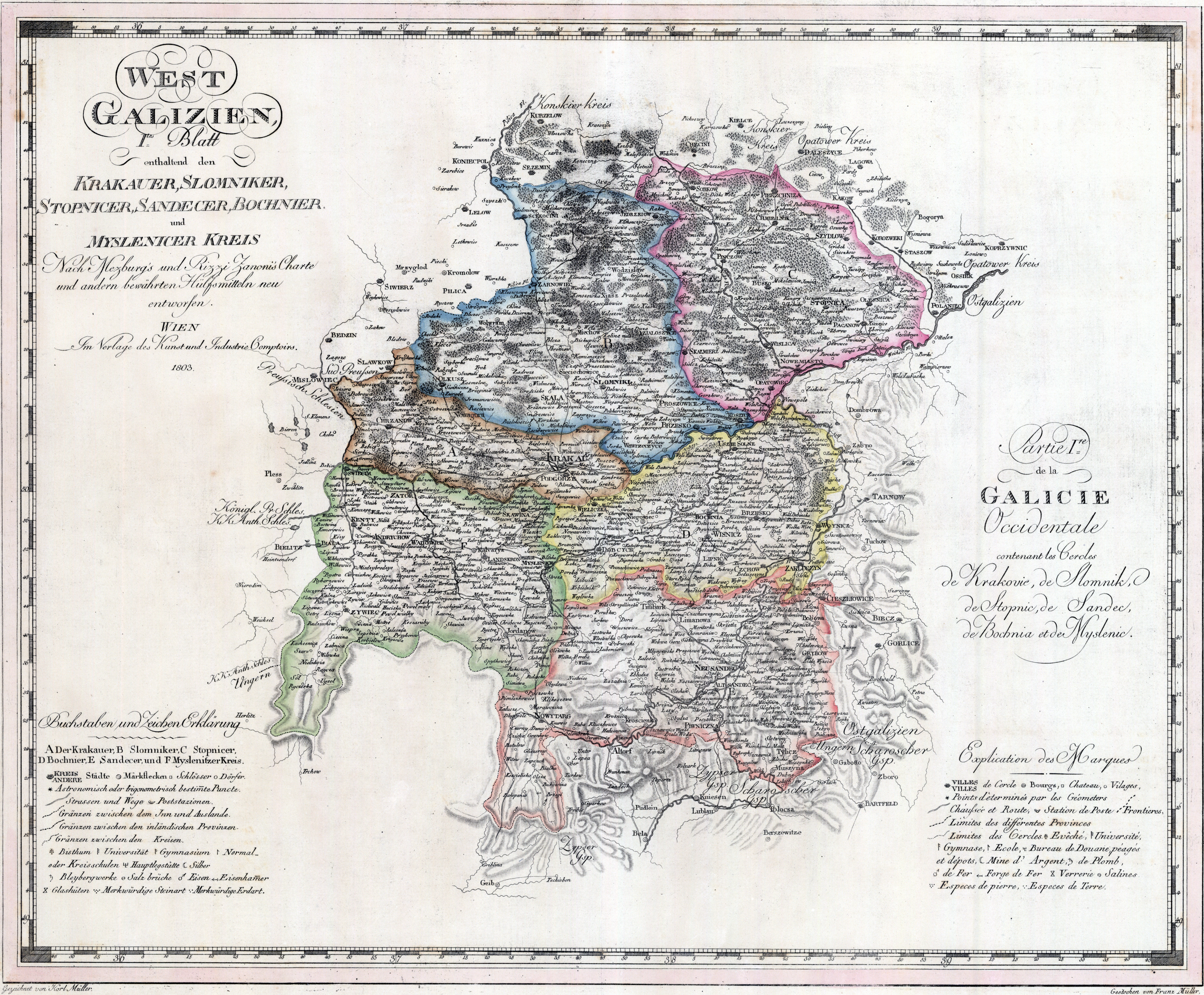
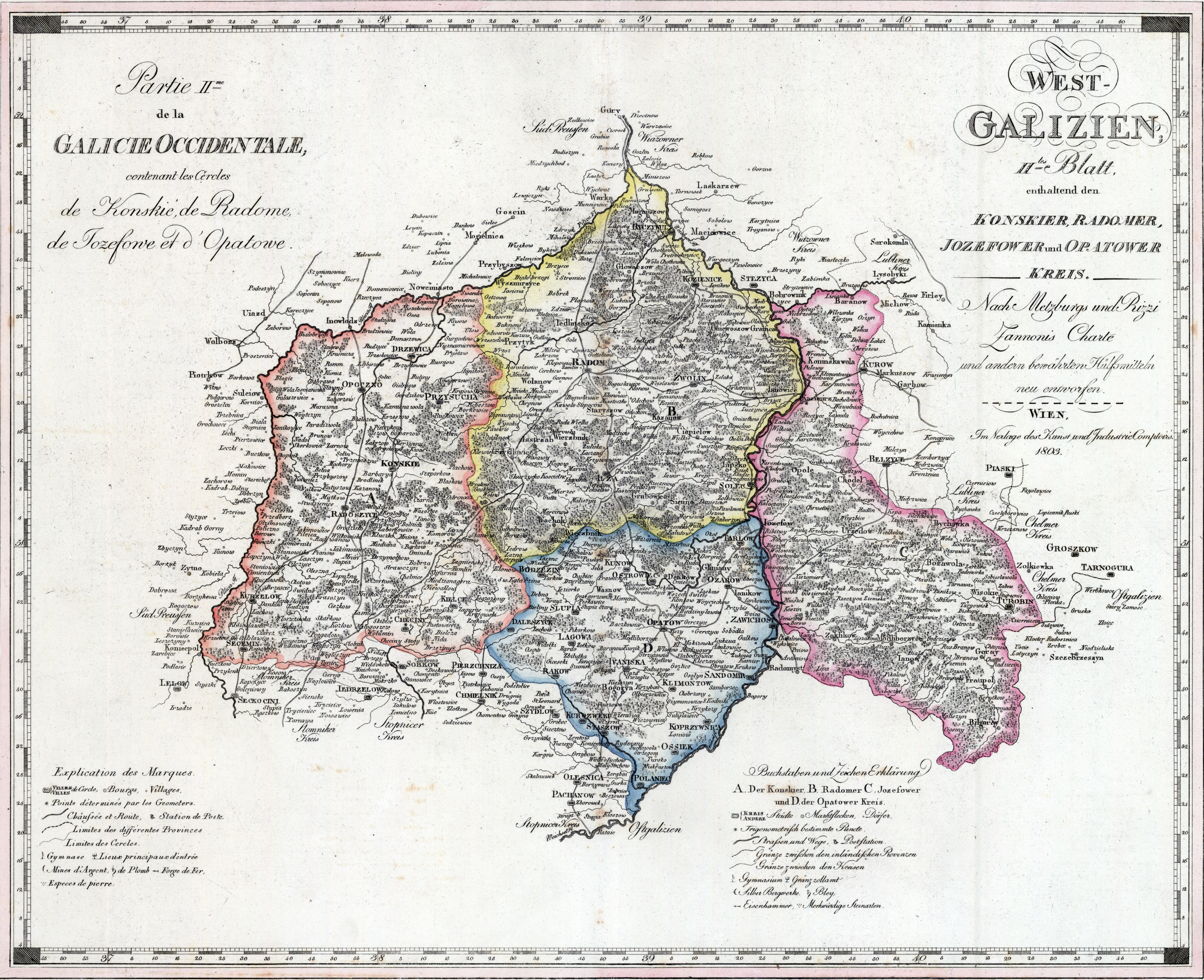
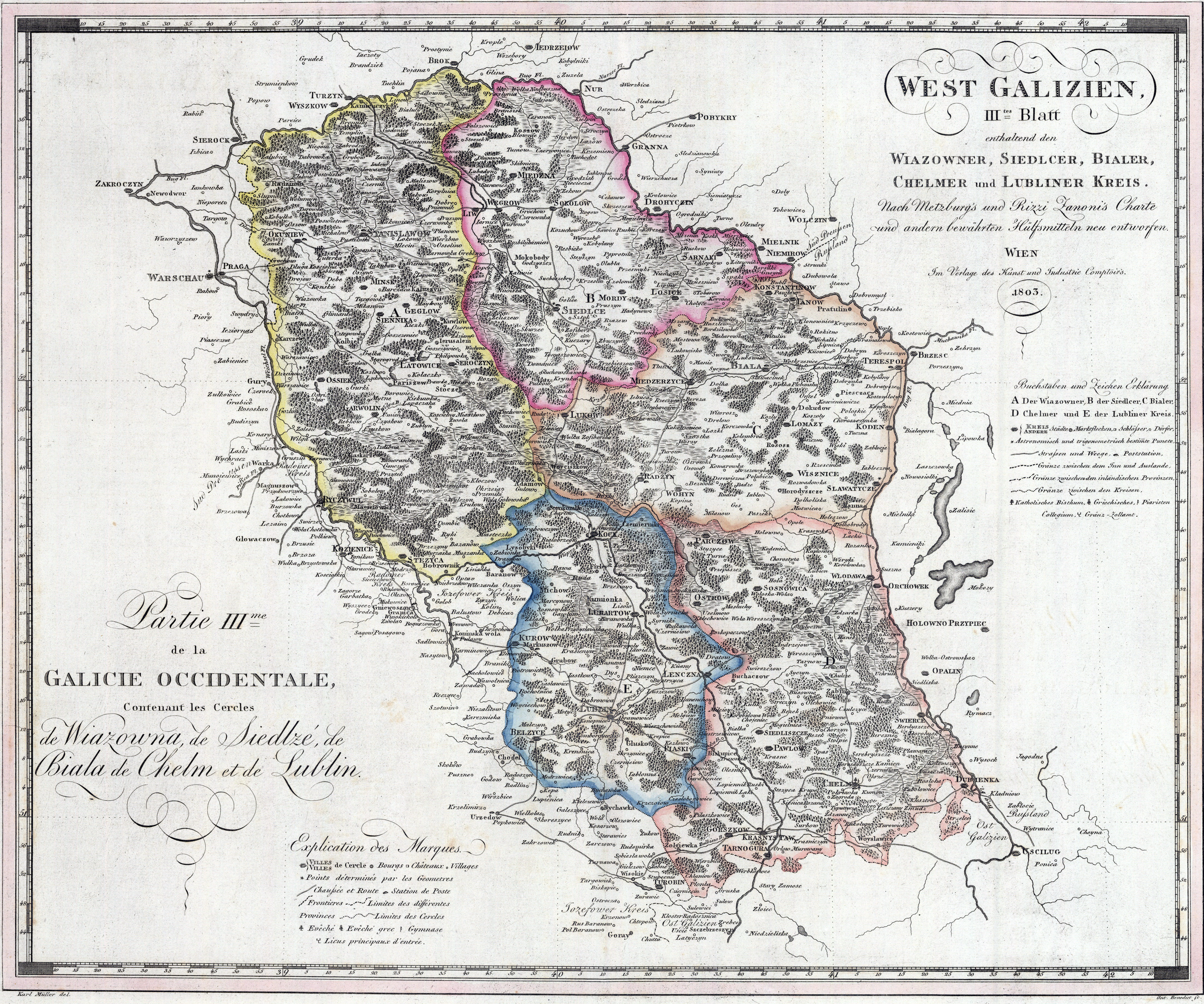
Maps of the Kreise of West Galicia c. 1803

In 1803 West and East Galicia were united into Galicia and the number of Kreise in West Galicia was reduced to 6: Krakuer, Kielcer, Radomer, Lubliner, Chełmer, Bialer.

In 1804 the Habsburg monarchy, which until then had been de jure a collection of nominally separate states in a personal union under the Habsburg(-Lorraine)s, was formally united into the Austrian Empire, making Galicia and Lodomeria an Austrian crown land.

In 1809 the Treaty of Schönbrunn ceded the third-partition-territory plus the Zamośćer Kreis and an area around Krakau on the right bank of the Vistula to the Duchy of Warsaw, a Napoleonic client. It also ceded the Tarnopoler Kreis and most of the Zalestschyker Kreis to the Russian Empire, where they became the Tarnopolsky Krai. Most of the rump of Zalestschyker Kreis was merged with a part of the Stanislauer Kreis to become the Kolomeaer Kreis with the rest going to the Stanislauer Kreis itself.

The Tarnopolsky Krai was returned to Austria in 1815 (Congress of Vienna); the former Zalestschyker Kreis became the Czortkower Kreis. The area adjacent to Krakau on the right bank of the Vistula, which had been part of the Duchy of Warsaw, went to the Myslenicer and Bochnier Kreise, re-establishing the Vistula as the border. (The other territories which had been ceded to the Duchy of Warsaw on the other hand went to the Russian-controlled Congress Poland, other than the city of Kraków and its environs, which became the Free City of Cracow.)

In 1819 the Myslenicer Kreis became the Wadowicer Kreis.

The Free City of Cracow was annexed by Austria in 1846, nominally becoming the Grand Duchy of Kraków but administratively added to Galicia as the Krakauer Kreis. The extent of this Kreis, which matched that of the former free city, was similar but not identical to the earlier Krakauer Kreis of West Galicia.

The Bukowiner Kreis was detached as the Duchy of Bukovina in 1849.

In 1850, following the Revolutions of 1848 the Kreise were abolished and replaced with a system of political districts (see § Regierungsbezirke and political districts (1850–53)) but these changes were reversed in Bach's reforms from 1853. The changes to Galicia and Lodomeria were specifically laid out in 1854: they divided the crown land into two Verwaltungsgebiete (administrative regions/territories) based in Lemberg (Lviv/Lwów) and Krakau (Krawów), which each oversaw some of the land's Kreise; the two cities themselves were directly subordinate to the crown land. The Kreise were also subdivided into Bezirke ('districts'; also referred to as Amtsbezirke ('office districts')).

In 1860 Verwaltungsgebiet Krakau and Bukovina were dissolved and re-subordinated to Lemberg; the Jasłoer Kreis was partitioned between the Sandecer, Tarnower, Rzeszower and Sanoker Kreise; the Wadowicer and Bochnier Kreise were merged into Kreis Krakau. Bukovina was detached again in the 1861 February Patent.

Below is a list of the divisions (Verwaltungsgebiete, Kreise and Bezirke) as of 1854, with changes after that noted. (Divisions are listed with the names used in the legislation, i.e. mostly in contemporary German and/or Polish. Capitals are in bold.):

- City of **Lemberg**
- Verwaltungsgebiet Lemberg, containing the 12 eastern Kreise (1854–60):
  - Lemberger Kreis:
    1. Lemberg (environs)
    2. Grodek
    3. Szczerzec
    4. Winniki
    5. Janow
  - Zołkiewer Kreis:
    1. Kulikow
    2. Gross-Mosty
    3. Uhnow
    4. Niemirow
    5. Bełz
    6. Cieszanow
    7. Sokal
    8. **Zołkiew**
    9. Rawa
    10. Lubaczow
  - Przemyśler Kreis:
    1. Sądowa Wisznia
    2. Niżankowice
    3. Sieniawa
    4. Radymno
    5. Krakowiec
    6. Jaroslau
    7. Mościska
    8. Jaworow
    9. **Przemyśl**
  - Sanoker Kreis:
    1. Lutowiska
    2. Bukowsko
    3. Ustrzyki dolne
    4. Baligrod
    5. Lisko
    6. Dobromil
    7. **Sanok**
    8. Rymanow
    9. Bircza
    10. Dubiecko
    11. Brzozow
    From 1860 also: Krosno, Żmigród and Dukla
  - Złoczower Kreis:
    1. Kamionka Strumiłowa
    2. Łopatyn
    3. Radziechow
    4. Busk
    5. Olesko
    6. Gliniany
    7. Załośce
    8. **Złoczow**
    9. Zborow
    10. Brody
  - Brzezaner Kreis:
    1. Rohatyn
    2. Przemyślany
    3. Bursztyn
    4. Chodorow
    5. Bobrka
    6. Podhajce
    7. Kozowa
    8. **Brzezan**
  - Stryier Kreis:
    1. Rożniatow
    2. Wojniłów
    3. Bolechow
    4. Dolina
    5. Mikołajow
    6. Zurawno
    7. Skole
    8. **Stryj**
    9. Kałusz
  - Samborer Kreis:
    1. Łąka
    2. Borynia
    3. Rudki
    4. Starasol
    5. Medenice
    6. Podbusz
    7. Staremiasto
    8. Turka
    9. Komarno
    10. **Sambor**
    11. Drohobycz
  - Tarnopoler Kreis:
    1. Ihrowice
    2. Medyn
    3. Mikulince
    4. Złotniki
    5. Trembowla
    6. Grzymałow
    7. Skałat
    8. Zbaraż
    9. **Tarnopol**
  - Czortkower Kreis:
    1. Budzanow
    2. Tłuste
    3. Hussiatyn
    4. Jazłowiec
    5. Zaleszczyk
    6. **Czortkow**
    7. Mielnica
    8. Borszczow
    9. Kopeczynce
  - Kolomeaer Kreis:
    1. Gwoździez
    2. Zabłotow
    3. Kuty
    4. Obertyn
    5. Sniatyn
    6. **Kolomea**
    7. Peczeniżyn
    8. Horodenka
    9. Kossow
  - Stanislauer Kreis:
    1. Nadworna
    2. Bohorodczany
    3. Delatyn
    4. Sołotwina
    5. Buczacz
    6. Tysmienic
    7. Monasterzyska
    8. Halicz
    9. **Stanislau**
    10. Tłumacz
  - 1860–61 Czernowitzer Kreis (Bukovina; capital Czernowitz; had also been part of Galicia and Lodomeria 1786–1849); Bezirke (from 1854):
    1. Dorna
    2. Putilla
    3. Wysznitz
    4. Kimpolung
    5. Solka
    6. Gurahumora
    7. Sereth
    8. Waskoutz am Czeremosz
    9. Sadagura
    10. Storoschinetz
    11. Kotzmann
    12. Zastawna
    13. Suczawa
    14. Radautz
    15. Czernowitz (environs)
- City of Krakau
- Verwaltungsgebiet Krakau, containing the 7 western Kreise (1854–60):
  - Krakauer Kreis:
    1. Jaworzno
    2. Mogiła (today part of Kraków)
    3. Chrzanow
    4. Krzeszowice
    5. Liszki
    From 1860 also all of the Bezirke previously belonging to the Wadowicer and Bochniaer Kreise.
  - Wadowicer Kreis; in 1860 merged into the Krakauer Kreis; Bezirke:
    1. Skawina
    2. Oswięcim
    3. Maków
    4. Miłowka
    5. Slemień
    6. Myślenice
    7. Andrichau
    8. Jordanów
    9. **Wadowice**
    10. Kalwarya
    11. Kenty
    12. Seypusch
    13. Biała
  - Sandecer Kreis:
    1. Grybow
    2. Cięszkowice
    3. Czarny-Dunajec
    4. Krościenko
    5. Alt-Sandec
    6. Neumarkt
    7. Limanowa
    8. Muszyna
    9. Tymbark
    10. **Neu-Sandec**
    Czarny-Dunajec merged with Neumarkt 1860; from 1860 also: Gorlice and Biecz
  - Jasłoer Kreis; in 1860 split between the Sandecer, Tarnower, Rzeszower and Sanoker Kreise; Bezirke:
    1. Dukla
    2. Zmigrod
    3. Frysztak
    4. Brzostek
    5. Strzyżow
    6. **Jasło**
    7. Krosno
    8. Biecz
    9. Gorlice
  - Rzeszower Kreis:
    1. Ułanow
    2. Tarnobrzeg
    3. Głogow
    4. Rozwadow
    5. Sokołkow
    6. Tyczyn
    7. Nisko
    8. Łancut
    9. Przeworsk
    10. **Rzeszow**
    11. Lezaysk
    From 1860 also: Strzyżów
  - Tarnower Kreis:
    1. Dembica
    2. Tuchow
    3. Zabno
    4. Kolbuszow
    5. Dombrowa
    6. Ropczyce
    7. Pilsno
    8. Mielec
    9. Zasow
    10. **Tarnow**
    From 1860 also: Brzostek, Frysztak and Jasło
  - Bochnier Kreis (usually spelled Bochnier Kreis); in 1860 merged into the Krakauer Kreis; Bezirke:
    1. Podgorze
    2. Woynicz
    3. Niepołomice
    4. Dobczyce
    5. Wieliczka
    6. Radłow
    7. Brzesko
    8. Wisnicz
    9. **Bochnia**

The Kreise in Galicia and Lodomeria were abolished in 1865 (enacted 23 September, effective 31 October), with the Bezirksämter subordinated directly to Lemberg.

== Regierungsbezirke and political districts (1850–53) ==
In 1850, in the aftermath of the revolutions of 1848, Galicia and Lodomeria was divided into three Regierungsbezirke ('government districts'), named after their capitals: Lemberg (Lviv/Lwów), Krakau (Kraków) and Stanislau (Stanislaviv/Stanisławów; today called Ivano-Frankivsk). The Kreise were abolished and replaced with political districts (Bezirkshauptmannschaften). While political districts where also introduced in many other crown lands, they generally either retained their Kreise (often with a reduced number) or were not divided other than into political districts; the Regierungsbezirke were specific to Galicia and Lodomeria. This first attempt to introduce political districts to the Empire ended in 1853 with Bach's reforms.

- Regierungsbezirk Krakau, the area from the Carpathians to the Vistula, and the San basin (i.e. the area west of the San basin). Comprised the former Kreise of Krakau, Wadowice, Bochnia, Sandec, Jasło, Tarnów and Rzeszow, along with parts of the Sanok and Przemyśl Kreise. It had 26 districts:
  1. Krakau
  2. Chrzanow
  3. Podgórze
  4. Kenty
  5. Saybusch
  6. Wadowice
  7. Jordanow
  8. Neumarkt
  9. Dobczyce
  10. Bochnia
  11. Alt-Sandec
  12. Neu-Sandec
  13. Grybow
  14. Gorlice
  15. Jasło
  16. Tarnow
  17. Dombrowa
  18. Sędziszow
  19. Pilsno
  20. Mielec
  21. Dukla
  22. Krosno
  23. Rzeszow
  24. Łańcut
  25. Rozwadow
  26. Przeworsk
- Regierungsbezirk Lemberg – the former Kreise of Przemyśl, Zołkiew, Lemberg, Sanok, and Sambor, along with parts of the Stryi, Złoczow and Brzeżan Kreise. It had 19 districts:
  1. Dubiecko
  2. Jaroslau
  3. Przemyśl
  4. Jaworow
  5. Lubaczow
  6. Sambor
  7. Sanok
  8. Dobromil
  9. Stare Miasto
  10. Drohobycz
  11. Stryi
  12. Rawa
  13. Zołkiew
  14. Sokal
  15. Brody
  16. Lemberg
  17. Chodorow
  18. Grodek
  19. Złoczow
- Regierungsbezirk Stanislau – the former Kreise of Tarnopol, Czortkow, Stanislau and Kolomea, along with the remainder of the Stryi, Złoczow and Brzeżan Kreise. It had 18 districts:
  1. Załośce
  2. Tarnopol
  3. Skałat
  4. Bursztyn
  5. Brzeżan
  6. Podhayce
  7. Trembowla
  8. Czortkow
  9. Borszezow
  10. Buczacz
  11. Kałusz
  12. Dolina
  13. Stanislau
  14. Tyśmienica
  15. Nadworna
  16. Horodenka
  17. Kolomea
  18. Kuty

== Political districts (from 1867) ==
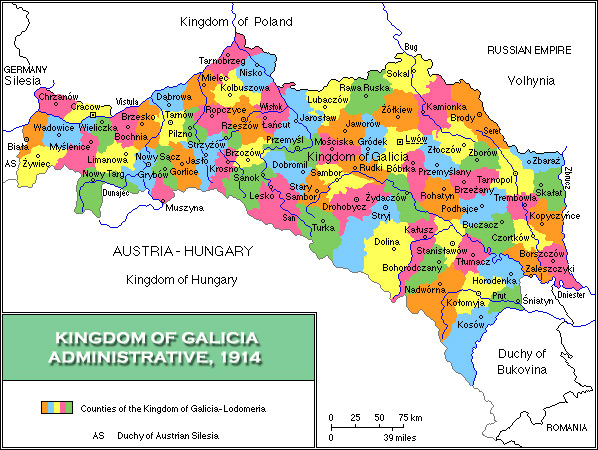
Administrative districts of Galicia in 1914

In 1867 political districts (German: Bezirke or more properly Bezirkshauptmannschaften; Polish: powiaty; also called counties (in the administrative sense) when translated from the Polish – see Powiat § Names and English equivalents) were reintroduced to Galicia and Lodomeria. They originally numbered 74:

- Bezirk Krakau; Powiat krakowski (Kraków)
- Bezirk Chrzanow; Powiat chrzanowski (Chrzanów)
- Bezirk Wieliczka; Powiat wielicki (Wieliczka)
- Bezirk Bochnia; Powiat bocheński (Bochnia)
- Bezirk Brzesko; Powiat brzeski (Brzesko)
- Bezirk Wadowice; Powiat wadowicki (Wadowice)
- Bezirk Biała/Biala; Powiat bialski (Biała Krakowska, today part of Bielsko-Biała)
- Bezirk Saybusch; Powiat żywiecki (Żywiec)
- Bezirk Myślenice; Powiat myślenicki (Myślenice)
- Bezirk Neu Sandec; Powiat nowosądecki (Nowy Sącz)
- Bezirk Neumarkt; Powiat nowotarski (Nowy Targ)
- Bezirk Limanowa; Powiat limanowski (Limanowa)
- Bezirk Grybow; Powiat grybowski (Grybów)
- Bezirk Gorlice; Powiat gorlicki (Gorlice)
- Bezirk Tarnow; Powiat tarnowski (Tarnów)
- Bezirk Dąbrowa; Powiat dąbrowski (Dąbrowa Tarnowska)
- Bezirk Mielec; Powiat mielecki (Mielec)
- Bezirk Ropczyce; Powiat ropczycki (Ropczyce)
- Bezirk Pilzno; Powiat pilzneński (Pilzno)
- Bezirk Jasło; Powiat jasielski (Jasło)
- Bezirk Rzeszow; Powiat rzeszowski (Rzeszów)
- Bezirk Kolbuszow; Powiat kolbuszowski (Kolbuszowa)
- Bezirk Tarnobrzeg; Powiat tarnobrzeski (Tarnobrzeg)
- Bezirk Nisko; Powiat niski (Nisko)
- Bezirk Łańcut; Powiat łańcucki (Łańcut)
- Bezirk Sanok; Powiat sanocki (Sanok)
- Bezirk Lisko; Powiat liski (Lesko)
- Bezirk Bircza (Bircza); Bezirk Dobromil / Powiat dobromilski (Dobromyl) from 1 October 1876.
- Bezirk Brzozow; Powiat brzozowski (Brzozów)
- Bezirk Krosno; Powiat krośnieński (Krosno)
- Bezirk Sambor; Powiat samborski (Sambir)
- Bezirk Staremiasto (Stare Misto); Bezirk Stary Sambor / Powiat starosamborski / Старосамбірський повіт (Staryi Sambir) after 1899
- Bezirk Turka; Powiat turczański (Turka)
- Bezirk Drohobycz; Powiat drohobycki (Drohobych)
- Bezirk Rudki; Powiat rudecki (Rudky)
- Bezirk Przemysl; Powiat przemyski (Przemyśl)
- Bezirk Jaroslau; Powiat jarosławski (Jarosław)
- Bezirk Mościska; Powiat mościski (Mostyska)
- Bezirk Jaworów; Powiat jaworowski (Yavoriv)
- Bezirk Lemberg; Powiat lwowski; Львівський повіт (Lviv)
- Bezirk Grodek; Powiat gródecki (Horodok)
- Bezirk Żółkiew; Powiat żółkiewski (Zhovkva)
- Bezirk Sokal; Powiat sokalski (Sokal)
- Bezirk Rawa; Powiat rawski (Rava-Ruska)
- Bezirk Cieszanów; Powiat cieszanowski (Cieszanów)
- Bezirk Brzeżan; Powiat brzeżański (Berezhany)
- Bezirk Bobrka; Powiat bóbrecki (Bibrka)
- Bezirk Rohatyn; Powiat rohatyński (Rohatyn)
- Bezirk Podhajce; Powiat podhajecki (Pidhaitsi)
- Bezirk Przemyslany; Powiat przemyślański (Peremyshliany)
- Bezirk Stryj; Powiat stryjski (Stryi)
- Bezirk Dolina; Powiat doliński (Dolyna)
- Bezirk Kałusz; Powiat kałuski (Kalush)
- Bezirk Zydaczow; Powiat żydaczowski (Zhydachiv)
- Bezirk Stanislau; Powiat stanisławowski; Станиславівський повіт (Stanisławów/Stanyslaviv; modern Ivano-Frankivsk)
- Bezirk Bohorodczany; Powiat bohorodczański (Bohorodchany)
- Bezirk Nadworna; Powiat nadwórniański (Nadvirna)
- Bezirk Tłumacz; Powiat tłumacki; Тлумацький повіт (Tlumach)
- Bezirk Buczacz; Powiat buczacki; Бучацький повіт (Buchach)
- Bezirk Kołomea; Powiat kołomyjski; Коломийський повіт (Kolomyia)
- Bezirk Horodenka; Powiat horodeński (Horodenka)
- Bezirk Sniatyn; Powiat śniatyński; Снятинський повіт (Sniatyn)
- Bezirk Kossow; Powiat kosowski (Kosiv)
- Bezirk Zaleszczyki; Powiat zaleszczycki; Заліщицький повіт (Zalishchyky)
- Bezirk Borszczow; Powiat borszczowski; Борщівський повіт (Borshchiv)
- Bezirk Husiatyn; Гусятинський повіт; Гусятинський повіт (Husiatyn)
- Bezirk Czortków; Powiat czortkowski; Чортківський повіт (Chortkiv)
- Bezirk Tarnopol; Powiat tarnopolski; Тернопільський повіт (Ternopil)
- Bezirk Zbaraż; Powiat zbaraski; Збаразький повіт (Zbarazh)
- Bezirk Skałat; Powiat skałacki; Скалатський повіт (Skalat)
- Bezirk Trembowla; Powiat trembowelski; Теребовлянський повіт (Terebovlia)
- Bezirk Złoczow; Powiat złoczowski (Zolochiv)
- Bezirk Brody; Powiat brodzki (Brody)
- Bezirk Kamionka Strumiłowa; Powiat kamionecki (Kamianka-Buzka)

Lemberg and Krakau remained independent cities; the city of Krakau lost Czarnawieś, Kawiory, Dąbie, Głębinów, Beszcz, Piaski and Grzegorzki to Bezirk Krakau.

The initial 23 January boundaries were amended on 19 July 1867. In addition to boundary changes this reform assigned several municipalities to the Bircza and Tarnów districts which had initially been left unassigned. On 10 January 1869 a few more municipalities changed hands and more unassigned municipalities were allocated to the Bircza, Drohobycz, Turka, Staremiasto, Mościska, Lemberg and Podhajce districts.

A broad boundary reform took effect on 1 August 1878. These reforms adjusted the boundaries of both the political districts and the judicial districts (Gerichtsbezirke), the latter of which had not been adjusted in 1867.

Some other districts were created later:

- Bezirk Podgórze; Powiat podgórski (Podgórze): constituted on 15 September 1896 from the judicial districts (Gerichtsbezirke) of Podgórze and Skawina (formerly part of Bezirk Wieliczka). It gained some municipalities from Bezirk Wadowice on 1 January 1899 (Borek Szlachecki, Facimiech, Gołuchowice, Krzęcin, Ochodza, Polanka-Haller and Zelczyna) and 1 June 1903 (Pozowice). It lost some villages to the city of Kraków in 1910 (Dębniki and Zakrzówek with Kapelanka), 1911 (Ludwinów) and 1912 (Płaszów). Podgórze itself was incorporated into the city of Kraków on 1 July 1915; the district became "Bezirk Podgórze-Land" on the same day.
- Bezirk Strzyżów; Powiat strzyżowski (Strzyżów) on 15 September 1896
- Bezirk Peczeniżyn; Powiat peczeniżyński (Pechenizhyn) on 15 July 1898
- Bezirk Przeworsk; Powiat przeworski (Przeworsk) on 1 November 1899
- Bezirk Zborów; Powiat zborowski; Зборівський повіт (Zboriv) on 1 September 1904
- Bezirk Oświęcim/Auschwitz (Oświęcim) on 1 July 1910
- Bezirk Skole (Skole) on 1 January 1911
- Bezirk Radziechów (Radekhiv) on 1 January 1912

In 1902 the Galician-Hungarian border was adjusted slightly, now running along the mountain ridge through the peak of Rysy; prior to this it had run through the Morskie Oko lake about a kilometre to the west. This therefore slightly expanded Neumarkt/Nowy Targ district.

== Later History ==
=== Interwar period ===
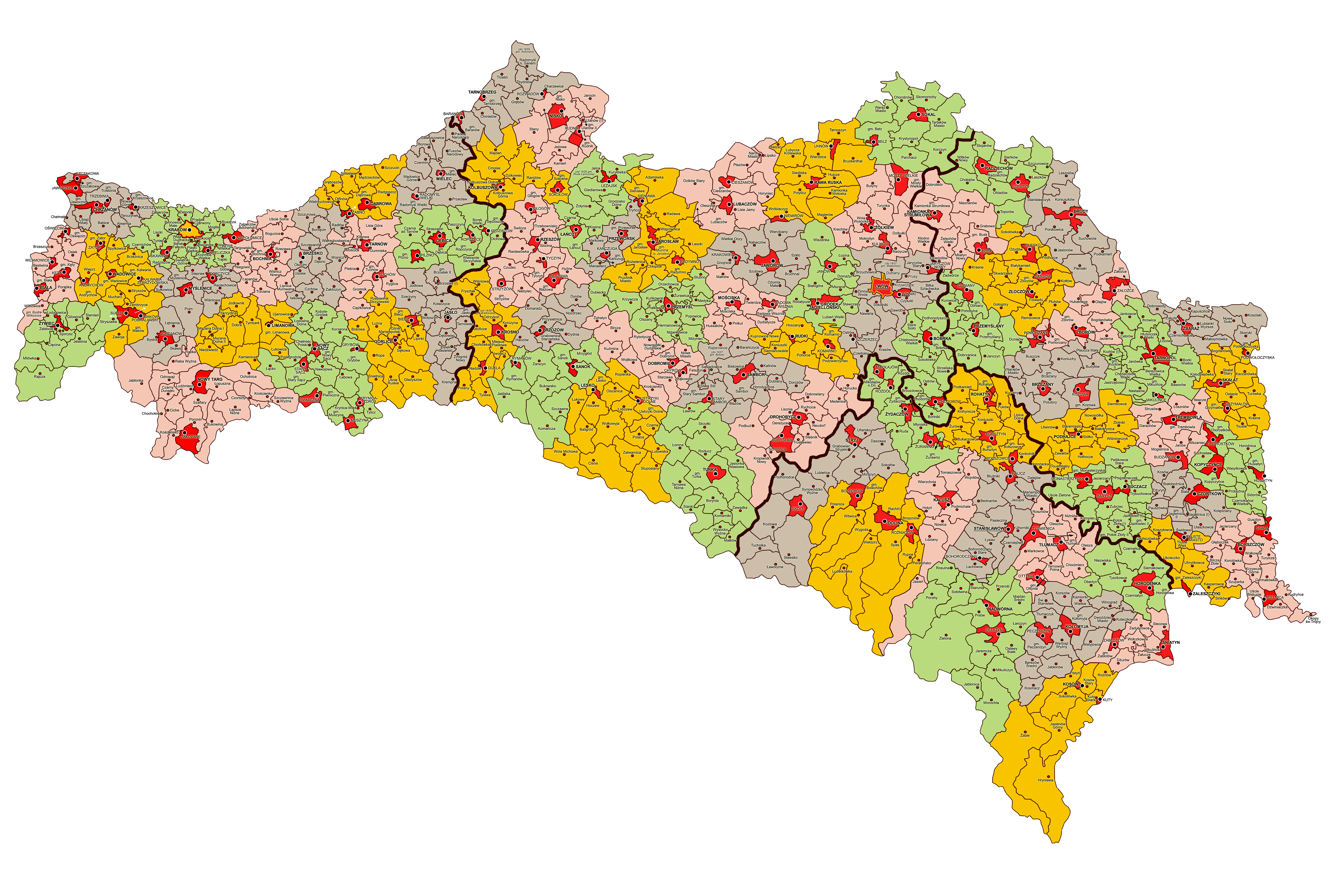
Administrative map comprising the voivodeships of Kraków, Lwów, Stanisławów, and Tarnopol in 1938

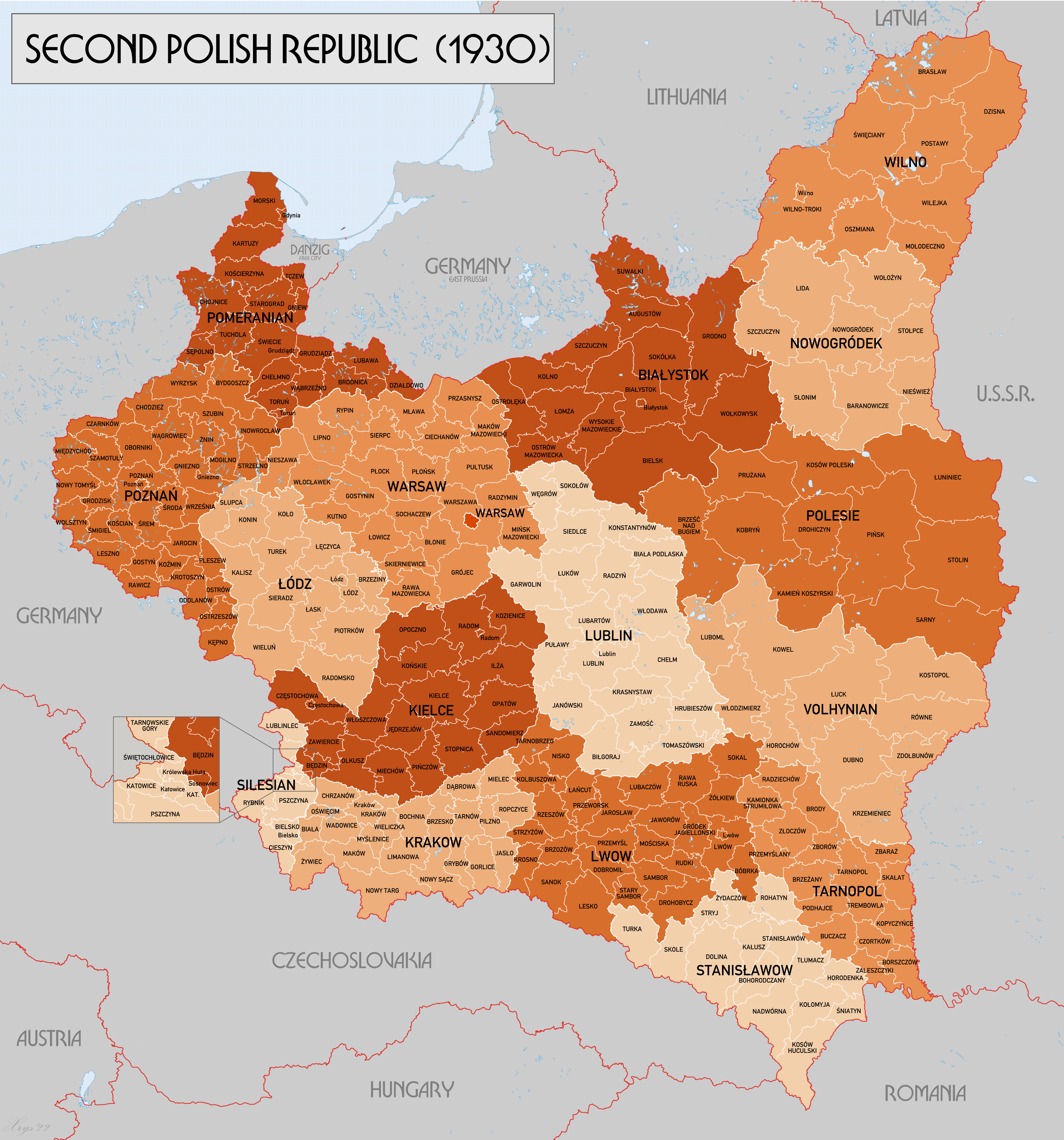
Administrative divisions of Poland c. 1930.

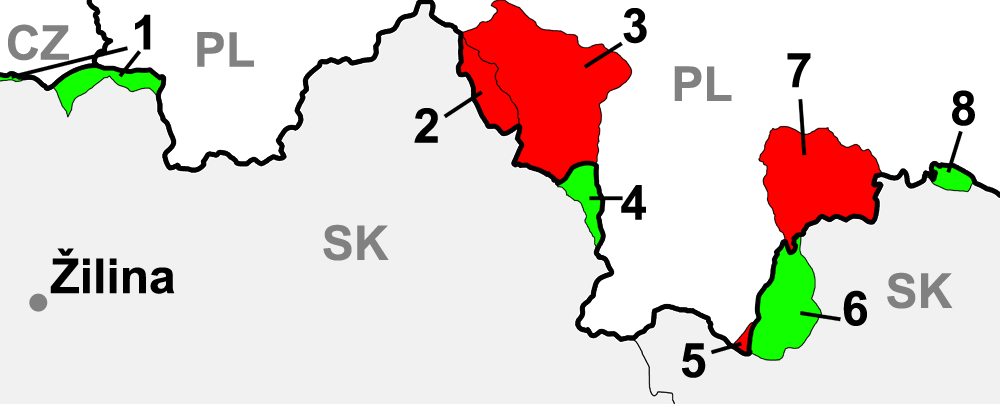
Border changes between Galicia and Lodomeria/Poland and Hungary/Czechoslovakia. 1902–58.

During the Interwar period what had been Galicia and Lodomeria became part of the Second Polish Republic. Its territory became the Kraków, Lwów, Tarnopol and Stanisławów Voivodeships. For the most part the former political districts were transitioned directly into Polish powiats (counties or districts). Kraków Voivodeship also gained a small amount of territory annexed from Hungary (Jabłonka and Nowa Biała), which would become a border conflict with Czechoslovakia. These areas were initially organised as Powiat spisko-orawski before its incorporation into Nowy Targ powiat (which corresponds to the modern Nowy Targ and Tatra powiats) in 1925.

In 1938 some additional territories along what was by this time the Polish-Czechoslovak border were ceded to Kraków Voivodeship: Javorina and Lesnica.

=== World War II ===
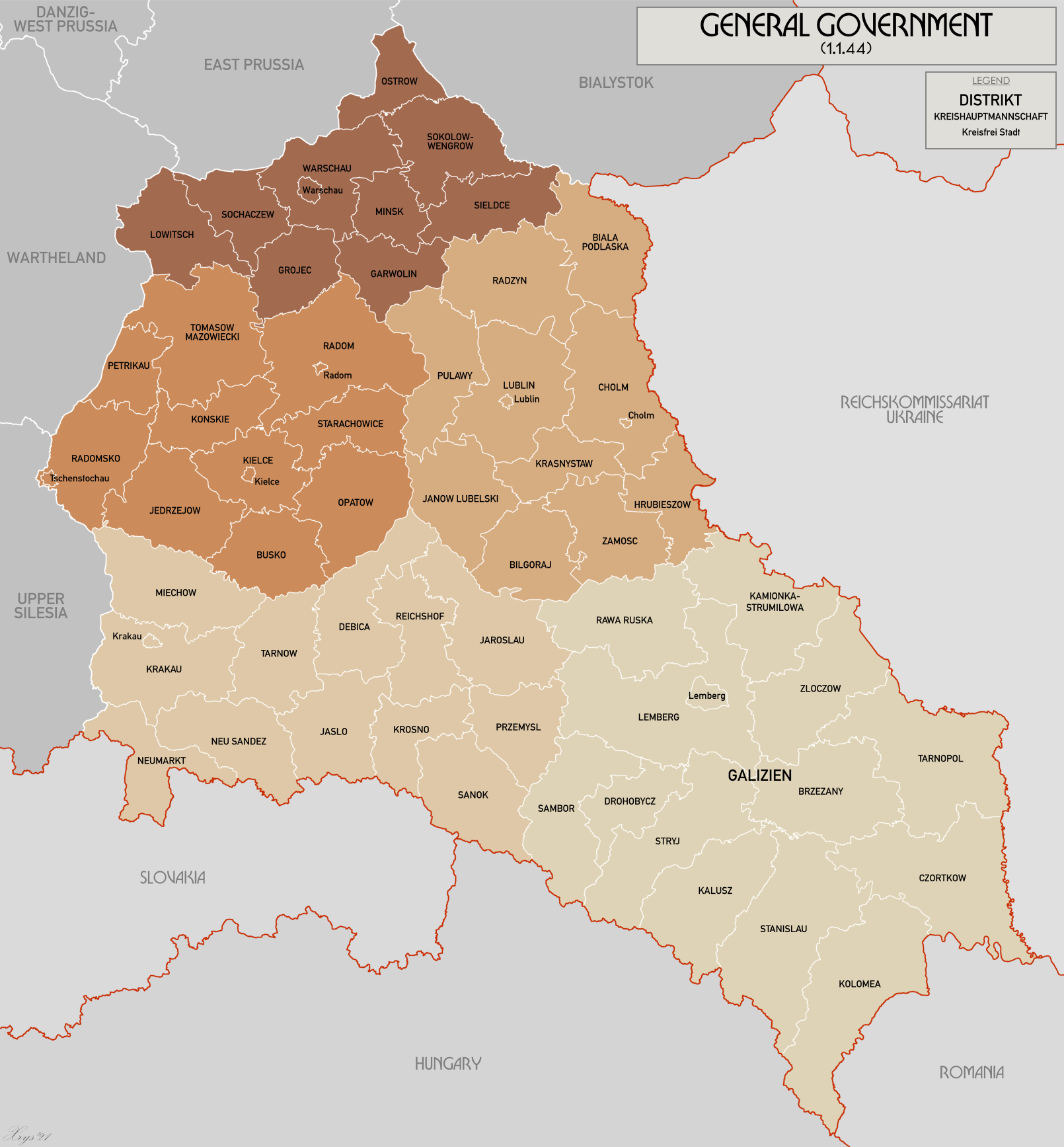
Map of the Nazi General Government after 1941. Kraków and Galicia are the two southernmost districts

In 1939 at the beginning of World War II Poland was jointly occupied and annexed by Nazi Germany and the Soviet Union in accordance with the Molotov–Ribbentrop Pact. Most of the western parts of the former Galicia and Lodomeria became part of the Nazi General Government, largely forming the Kraków District (Distrikt Krakau), although some additional areas north of Kraków (most of which had incidentally been part of West Galicia) were also included; the northeastern border lay along the San, placing a small part of it in the Lublin District (Distrikt Lublin). The parts furthest to the west became part of Germany-proper within the East Upper Silesia area of Upper Silesia Province. The border between the General Government and what was by this time the Slovak State was restored to that of the pre-1918 Galicia-Hungary border.

The Soviet-annexed formerly Galician territories became the Drohobych, Lviv, Stanislav (now Ivano-Frankivsk) and Tarnopil Oblasts of the Ukrainian SSR, which broadly correspond with the modern Lviv, Ivano-Frankivsk and Ternopil Oblasts (see below).

In July 1941 as part of the Nazi invasion of the Soviet Union the rest of the former Galicia and Lodomeria was annexed by Germany. Some western parts of this territory became part of the Kraków District while the rest formed the District of Galicia (Distrikt Galizien), which also gained a small amount of formerly Galician territory from the Lublin District which had been on the German-side of the 1939 border. The external borders of the District of Galicia (other than with the Kraków District) matched those of the former kingdom.

== Modern divisions ==
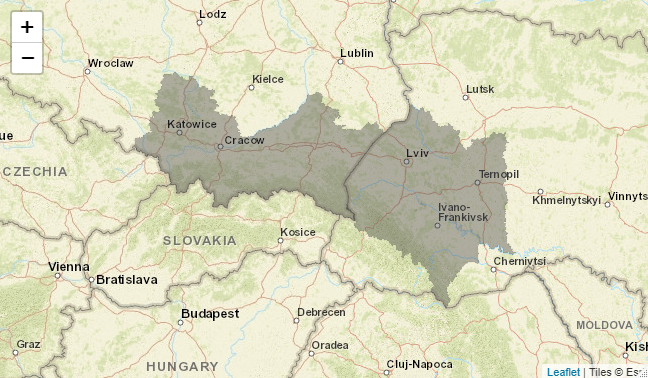
Current Polish Voivodeships and Ukrainian Oblasts that include the Kingdom of Galicia and Lodomeria

=== Administrative divisions in present-day Poland ===
In Poland today, there are parts of three voivodeships (provinces) that collectively formed the western part of the Kingdom of Galicia and Lodomeria.

Only Podkarpackie Voivodeship ("Subcarpathia") was entirely contained in the Kingdom. The majority of the territory of the Lesser Poland Voivodeship was contained in the Kingdom. From 1795 to 1815, three counties (powiats) that are situated north of the river Vistula were briefly part of the Kingdom: Olkusz County, Miechów County and Proszowice County. By the terms of the treaties of the Congress of Vienna they were annexed to Russian Poland ("Congress Poland") where they remained until the end of World War I. Additionally, the northernmost part of the land-county of Kraków around the villages of Sułoszowa, Skała and Słomniki were similarly allocated to Congress Russia; the remaining parts of the county were located in the Kingdom. The third voivodeship of Silesia contained only a small part of the Kingdom. The Silesian city-county of Jaworzno was originally part of the Kingdom's Chrzanowski county. The majority of the territory of the latter county is still an extant county in modern Poland – Chrzanów County – which is today located in the Lesser Poland voivodeship. The south-eastern Silesian land-counties of Żywiec County and Bielsko County along with the city-county of Bielsko-Biała formed the most westerly part of the Kingdom. The remaining 32 counties of Silesia were never part of the Kingdom.

Modern Provincial Entity	Modern Counties of the Province	Equivalent Counties of Galicia
Lesser Poland Voivodeship
Lesser Poland Voivodeship	Kraków (city-county)	Kraków
Lesser Poland Voivodeship	Tarnów (city-county)	Tarnów
Lesser Poland Voivodeship	Nowy Sącz (city-county)	Nowy Sącz
Lesser Poland Voivodeship	Kraków County	Partly in Kraków and partly in Wadowice
Lesser Poland Voivodeship	Nowy Sącz County	Partly in Nowy Sącz, Grybów and Muszyna
Lesser Poland Voivodeship	Tarnów County	Partly in Tarnów and Pilzno
Lesser Poland Voivodeship	Nowy Targ County	Nowy Targ (northern part)
Lesser Poland Voivodeship	Wadowice County	Wadowice
Lesser Poland Voivodeship	Oświęcim County	Partly in Biala and partly in Wadowice
Lesser Poland Voivodeship	Chrzanów County	Chrzanów
Lesser Poland Voivodeship	Limanowa County	Limanowa
Lesser Poland Voivodeship	Myślenice County	Myślenice eastern part)
Lesser Poland Voivodeship	Gorlice County	Gorlice
Lesser Poland Voivodeship	Wieliczka County	Wieliczka
Lesser Poland Voivodeship	Bochnia County	Bochnia
Lesser Poland Voivodeship	Brzesko County	Brzesko
Lesser Poland Voivodeship	Sucha County	Myślenice western part)
Lesser Poland Voivodeship	Tatra County	Nowy Targ (southern part)
Lesser Poland Voivodeship	Dąbrowa County	Dąbrowa
Silesian Voivodeship
Silesian Voivodeship	Jaworzno (city-county)	Chrzanów (western part)
Silesian Voivodeship	Bielsko-Biała (city-county)	Biala
Silesian Voivodeship	Bielsko County	Biala
Silesian Voivodeship	Żywiec County	Żywiec
Subcarpathia voivodeship
Subcarpathia voivodeship	Rzeszów city-county	Rzeszów (partly)
Subcarpathia voivodeship	Przemyśl city-county	Przemyśl
Subcarpathia voivodeship	Tarnobrzeg city-county	Tarnobrzeg (part of)
Subcarpathia voivodeship	Krosno city-county	Krosno
Subcarpathia voivodeship	Rzeszów County	Rzeszów (partly)
Subcarpathia voivodeship	Mielec County	Mielec
Subcarpathia voivodeship	Dębica County	Pilzo (partly)
Subcarpathia voivodeship	Jarosław County	Jarosław (eastern part)
Subcarpathia voivodeship	Jasło County	Jasło
Subcarpathia voivodeship	Krosno County	Krosno
Subcarpathia voivodeship	Lubaczów County	Lubaczów
Subcarpathia voivodeship	Stalowa Wola County	Northern part in Tarnobrzeg and southern part in Nisko
Subcarpathia voivodeship	Sanok County	Sanok
Subcarpathia voivodeship	Przeworsk County	Jarosław (western part)
Subcarpathia voivodeship	Łańcut County	Łańcut (south of the river Wisłoka)
Subcarpathia voivodeship	Ropczyce-Sędziszów County	Ropczyce
Subcarpathia voivodeship	Przemyśl County	Przemyśl (To the north) and Dobromil (To the south)
Subcarpathia voivodeship	Leżajsk County	Łańcut (north of the river Wisłoka)
Subcarpathia voivodeship	Nisko County	Nisko
Subcarpathia voivodeship	Brzozów County	Brzozów
Subcarpathia voivodeship	Strzyżów County	Strzyżów
Subcarpathia voivodeship	Kolbuszowa County	Kolbuszowa
Subcarpathia voivodeship	Tarnobrzeg County	Tarnobrzeg (western part)
Subcarpathia voivodeship	Lesko County	Lesko (western part)
Subcarpathia voivodeship	Bieszczady County	Lesko (eastern part) (Ceded by the USSR)

=== Administrative raions in present-day Ukraine ===
In Ukraine today, there are three provinces (oblasts) that formed the eastern part of the Kingdom of Galicia and Lodomeria. Two of these – Lviv Oblast and Ivano-Frankivsk Oblast – were entirely contained in the kingdom. The third – Ternopil Oblast – was mainly in the kingdom apart from four of its most northerly raions. These four raions – Kremenets Raion, Shumsk Raion, Lanivtsi and the northern half of Zbarazh Raion – were formerly part of the county of Krzemieniec in the Wolyn Voivodeship (province) of the Second Polish Republic during the interwar period. Prior to World War I, they were part of Congress Poland. They never formed part of the Kingdom of Galicia and Lodomeria. The remaining raions of Ternopil Oblast were all part of the Kingdom of Galicia and Lodomeria.

Modern Oblast of Ukraine	Modern Raions of the Oblast	Equivalent political districts of Galicia
Lviv Oblast	Brody Raion	Southern part of Brody district.
Lviv Oblast	Brody city-district	Brody
Lviv Oblast	Busk Raion	Złoczów
Lviv Oblast	Busk city-district	Złoczów
Lviv Oblast	Drohobych Raion	Drohobycz
Lviv Oblast	Drohobych city-district	Drohobycz
Lviv Oblast	Horodok Raion	Grodek (southern part) and Rudky (southern part)
Lviv Oblast	Kamianka-Buzka Raion	Kamionka
Lviv Oblast	Mostyska Raion	Mosciska
Lviv Oblast	Mykolaiv Raion	Żydaczów (Only the northern part of the district.)
Lviv Oblast	Peremyshliany Raion	Przemyślany and the northern part of Bóbrka
Lviv Oblast	Pustomyty Raion	Lviv district
Lviv Oblast	Radekhiv Raion	Northern part of Brody district and northern part of Kamionka.
Lviv Oblast	Sambir Raion	Sambor and Rudky
Lviv Oblast	Skole Raion	All of the old district of Stryj south of modern Stryi Raion.
Lviv Oblast	Sokal Raion	To the north Sokal and To the south Rawa-Ruska.
Lviv Oblast	Staryi Sambir Raion	Stari Sambor
Lviv Oblast	Stryi Raion	Stryj (Only the northern part of the district.)
Lviv Oblast	Turka Raion	Turka
Lviv Oblast	Yavoriv Raion	Jaworów and Grodek (northern part)
Lviv Oblast	Zhovkva Raion	To the north Rawa-Ruska and To the south Żółkiew
Lviv Oblast	Zhydachiv Raion	Żydaczów (Excluding the northern part of the district.)
Lviv Oblast	Zolochiv Raion	Eastern part of Żółkiew district and western part of Peremyshliany.
Ivano-Frankivsk Oblast
Ivano-Frankivsk Oblast	Bohorodchany Raion	
Ivano-Frankivsk Oblast	Verkhovyna Raion	
Ivano-Frankivsk Oblast	Verkhovyna	
Ivano-Frankivsk Oblast	Halych Raion	Stanislavov
Ivano-Frankivsk Oblast	Halych (City)	
Ivano-Frankivsk Oblast	Horodenka Raion	
Ivano-Frankivsk Oblast	Horodenka (City)	
Ivano-Frankivsk Oblast	Dolyna Raion	
Ivano-Frankivsk Oblast	Dolyna (City)	
Ivano-Frankivsk Oblast	Kalush Raion	
Ivano-Frankivsk Oblast	Kalush (City)	
Ivano-Frankivsk Oblast	Kolomyia Raion	
Ivano-Frankivsk Oblast	Kolomyia (City)	
Ivano-Frankivsk Oblast	Kosiv Raion	
Ivano-Frankivsk Oblast	Kosiv (City)	
Ivano-Frankivsk Oblast	Nadvirna Raion	
Ivano-Frankivsk Oblast	Nadvirna (City)	
Ivano-Frankivsk Oblast	Rohatyn Raion	
Ivano-Frankivsk Oblast	Rohatyn (City)	
Ivano-Frankivsk Oblast	Rozhniativ Raion	
Ivano-Frankivsk Oblast	Rozhniativ (City)	
Ivano-Frankivsk Oblast	Sniatyn Raion	
Ivano-Frankivsk Oblast	Sniatyn (City)	
Ivano-Frankivsk Oblast	Tysmenytsia Raion	
Ivano-Frankivsk Oblast	Tysmenytsia (City)	
Ivano-Frankivsk Oblast	Tlumach Raion	
Ivano-Frankivsk Oblast	Tlumach (City)	
Ternopil Oblast
Ternopil Oblast	Berezhany Raion	Western part of Brzeżany district.
Ternopil Oblast	Borshchiv Raion	Borszczów
Ternopil Oblast	Buchach Raion	Buczacz district
Ternopil Oblast	Chortkiv Raion	Czortków and the southern part of Kopychyntsi district
Ternopil Oblast	Husiatyn Raion	Kopychyntsi
Ternopil Oblast	Kozova Raion	Eastern part of Brzeżany district except for the city of Brzeżany itself.
Ternopil Oblast	Monastyryska Raion	Western part of Buczacz district.
Ternopil Oblast	Pidhaitsi Raion	Western part of Podhajce district.
Ternopil Oblast	Pidvolochysk Raion	Skalat district and the eastern part of Zbaraż district
Ternopil Oblast	Terebovlia Raion	Trembowla district in the east and Podhajce district in the west.
Ternopil Oblast	Ternopil Raion	Tarnopol district
Ternopil Oblast	Zalishchyky Raion	Zalishchyky
Ternopil Oblast	Zbarazh Raion	The western part of Zbaraż district and the southern part of Brody district.
Ternopil Oblast	Zboriv Raion	Zborów district

Carpathian Ruthenia, today largely contained in the Ukrainian oblast of Zakarpattia, was never part of the Kingdom of Galicia and Lodomeria nor of modern Poland. Instead, it was part of transleithanian lands of the Kingdom of Hungary.

== Jewish Administrative Centers ==
The government assigned some towns the status of Jewish Administrative Center. These Administrative Centers were responsible for maintaining Jewish vital records.

== See also ==
- Subdivisions of Ukraine
- Voivodeships of Poland
