= Borshevychi =

Village in Lviv Oblast, Ukraine

Borshevychi Боршевичі
- Village
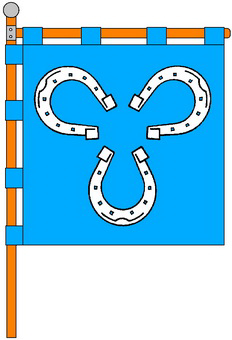
- Flag Coat of arms
- Interactive map of Borshevychi
- Location within Lviv Oblast
- Coordinates: 49°39′41″N 22°50′08″E
- Country: Ukraine
- Oblast: Lviv Oblast
- District: Sambir Raion
- Elevation /(average value of): 256 m (840 ft)

Population
  - Total: 328
  - Density: 1,102/km^{2} (2,850/sq mi)
- Time zone: UTC+2 (EET)
  - Summer (DST): UTC+3 (EEST)
- Postal code: 82010
- Area code: + 380 3238

Borshevychi (Ukrainian: Боршевичі, Polish: Borszowice) is a village (selo) in Sambir Raion, Lviv Oblast, of Western Ukraine. Located by the river Vyrva (Polish Wyrwa). It belongs to Dobromyl urban hromada, one of the hromadas of Ukraine.

The first mention of the village originates from 1457.

During the Interwar period, when the settlement was part of the Lwów Voivodeship of the Second Polish Republic.

Until 18 July 2020, Borshevychi belonged to Staryi Sambir Raion. The raion was abolished in July 2020 as part of the administrative reform of Ukraine, which reduced the number of raions of Lviv Oblast to seven. The area of Staryi Sambir Raion was merged into Sambir Raion.
