= Rozheve =

Village in Lviv Oblast, Ukraine

Rozheve Рожеве
- Village
- Location within Lviv Oblast Location within Ukraine
- Coordinates: 49°33′55″N 22°50′14″E
- Country: Ukraine
- Oblast: Lviv
- Raion: Sambir
- Area: 0.554 km^{2} (0.214 sq mi)
- Population: 257
  - Density: 464/km^{2} (1,200/sq mi)

Rozheve (Ukrainian: Рожеве, German: Rozenburg or Rosenburg, Polish: Rożewo) is a village (selo) in Sambir Raion, Lviv Oblast, in west Ukraine. It belongs to Dobromyl urban hromada, one of the hromadas of Ukraine.

The village was established in the course of Josephine colonization by German Roman Catholic settlers in 1783.

From 1918 to 1939 the village was in Poland. In January 1940 the local German population was moved out (Heim ins Reich), later replaced by Ukrainians.

Until 18 July 2020, Rozheve belonged to Staryi Sambir Raion. The raion was abolished in July 2020 as part of the administrative reform of Ukraine, which reduced the number of raions of Lviv Oblast to seven. The area of Staryi Sambir Raion was merged into Sambir Raion.
