= Salina mine =

Salt mine and mass grave site in Ukraine

Salina
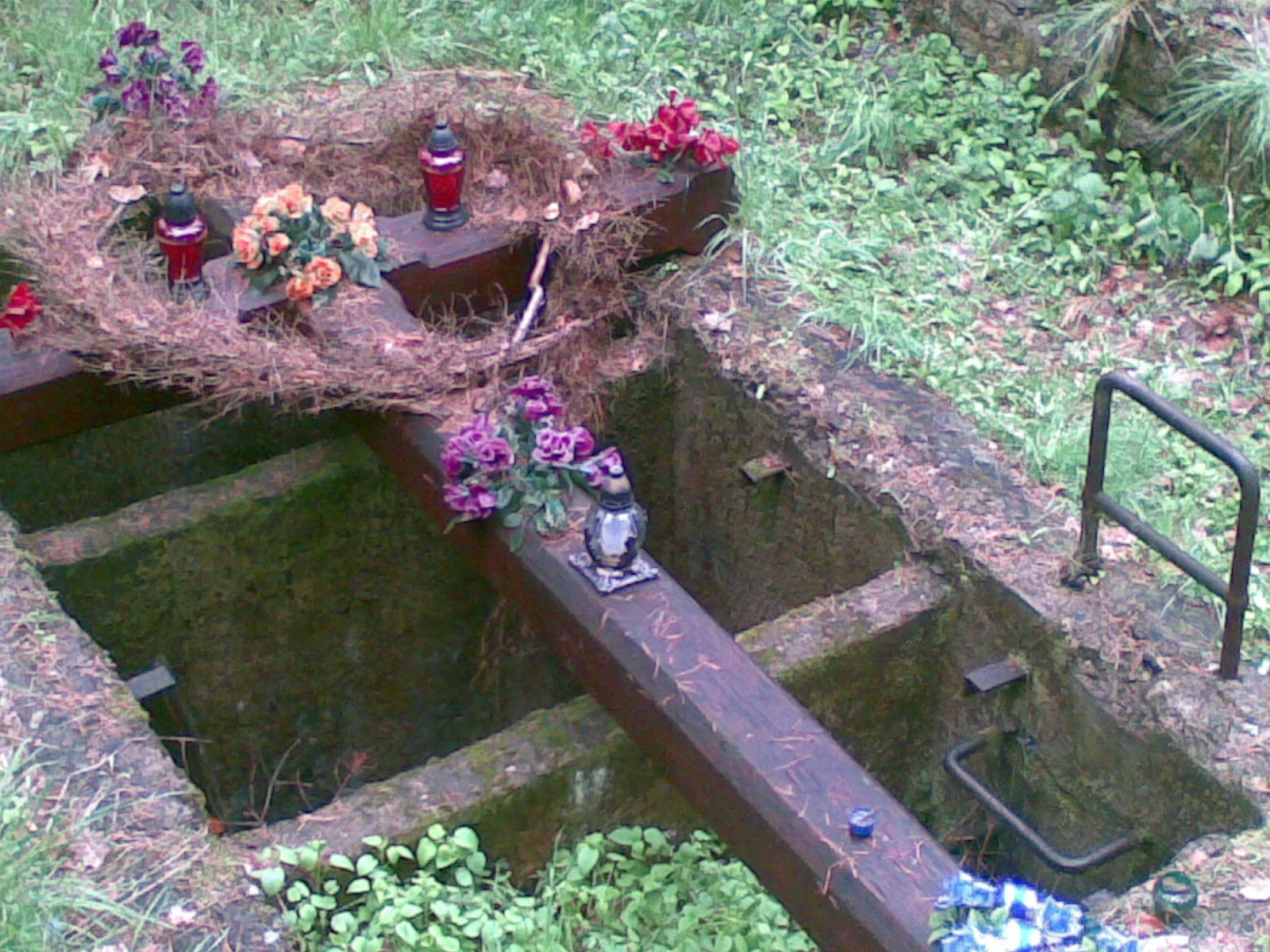
- Mine site

- The Salina mine in western Ukraine
- Location: Near town of Solyanuvatka, Lviv Oblast, Ukraine; 49°34′55″N 22°45′50″E

The Salina mine is a former salt mine in Lviv Oblast, Ukraine. Prior to World War II and the German invasion of the USSR, local residents worked in the mine, producing salt for use in Galicia. The mine is known for being the site of a mass grave during World War II.

== World War II and mass grave site ==
On 22 June 1941, the NKVD, the secret police for the Soviet Union, "liquidated" 3,600 people – most of which were intellectuals and activists from Dobromyl and Peremyshyl. Due to the ammunition shortage, many were killed via a hammer blow to the head, after which their bodies were disposed of into the mine. The 100-meter-deep pit was filled with their bodies. Only one man survived.

On 27 June 1941, residents of the nearby town of Dobromyl discovered the burial site. locals later found 50 children amongst the deceased.

After the massacre, a sanatorium was constructed and there were plans for a dance floor. Local residents expressed their dissent towards the Soviet officials and the plans were scrapped.

In 2007, a memorial service was held, followed five years later in 2012 by a March of Remembrance.
