= Nyzhankovychi =

Rural locality in Lviv Oblast, Ukraine

Nyzhankovychi Нижанковичі Niżankowice (in Polish)
- Rural settlement
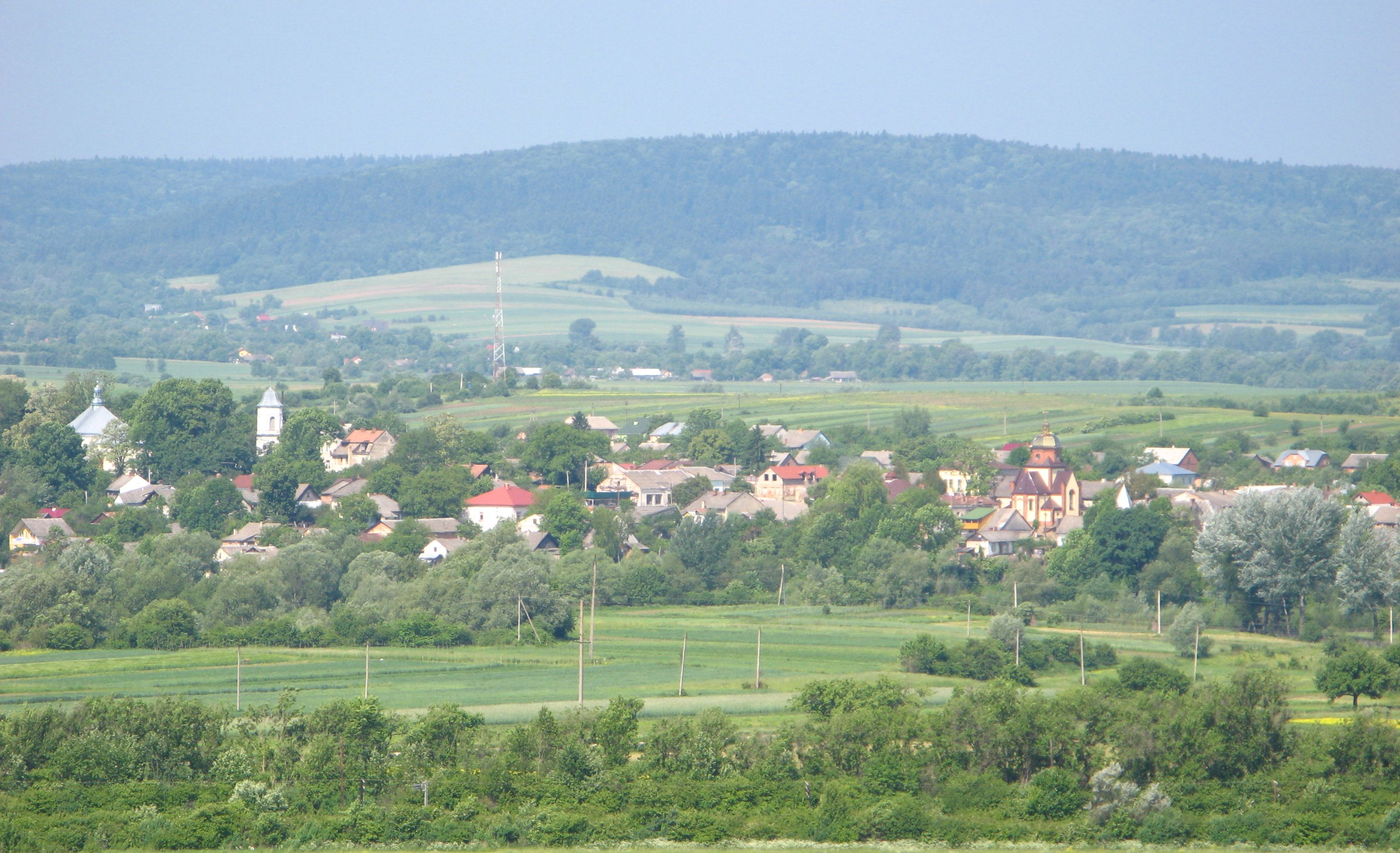

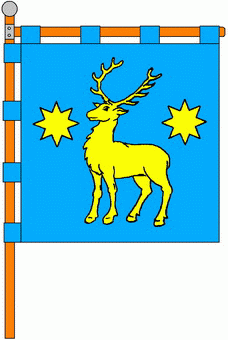
- Flag Coat of arms
- Interactive map of Nyzhankovychi
- Location in Lviv Oblast Location in Ukraine
- Coordinates: 49°41′03″N 22°48′55″E
- Country: Ukraine
- Oblast: Lviv Oblast
- Raion: Sambir Raion
- Hromada: Dobromyl urban hromada

Population (2022)
  - Total: 1,725
- Time zone: UTC+2 (EET)
  - Summer (DST): UTC+3 (EEST)

Nyzhankovychi (Ukrainian: Нижанковичі, Polish: Niżankowice) is a rural settlement in Sambir Raion of Lviv Oblast in Ukraine. It is located on the left bank of the Wiar, a right tributary of the San in the drainage basin of the Vistula, directly at the border with Poland. Nyzhankovychi belongs to Dobromyl urban hromada, one of the hromadas of Ukraine. Population: 1,725 (2022 estimate).

== History ==
Until 18 July 2020, Nyzhankovychi belonged to Staryi Sambir Raion. The raion was abolished in July 2020 as part of the administrative reform of Ukraine, which reduced the number of raions of Lviv Oblast to seven. The area of Staryi Sambir Raion was merged into Sambir Raion.

Until 26 January 2024, Nyzhankovychi was designated urban-type settlement. On this day, a new law entered into force which abolished this status, and Nyzhankovychi became a rural settlement.

== Economy ==
=== Transportation ===
Nyzhankovychi railway station is on the railway connecting Khyriv and Przemyśl, this is the last station on the Ukrainian side of the border. There is infrequent passenger traffic in the direction of Khyriv; there is no passenger traffic to Poland. Until 1994, the stretch between Nyzhankovychi and Khyriv had a dual gauge, which, in principle, allowed the trains to cross into Poland. After the 1994 reconstruction, only the Ukrainian gauge (1520 mm) remains.

The settlement has road access to Khyriv and from there further to Sambir and Lviv. In 2024 a new road crossing point opened in Nyzhankovychi.

== Gallery ==
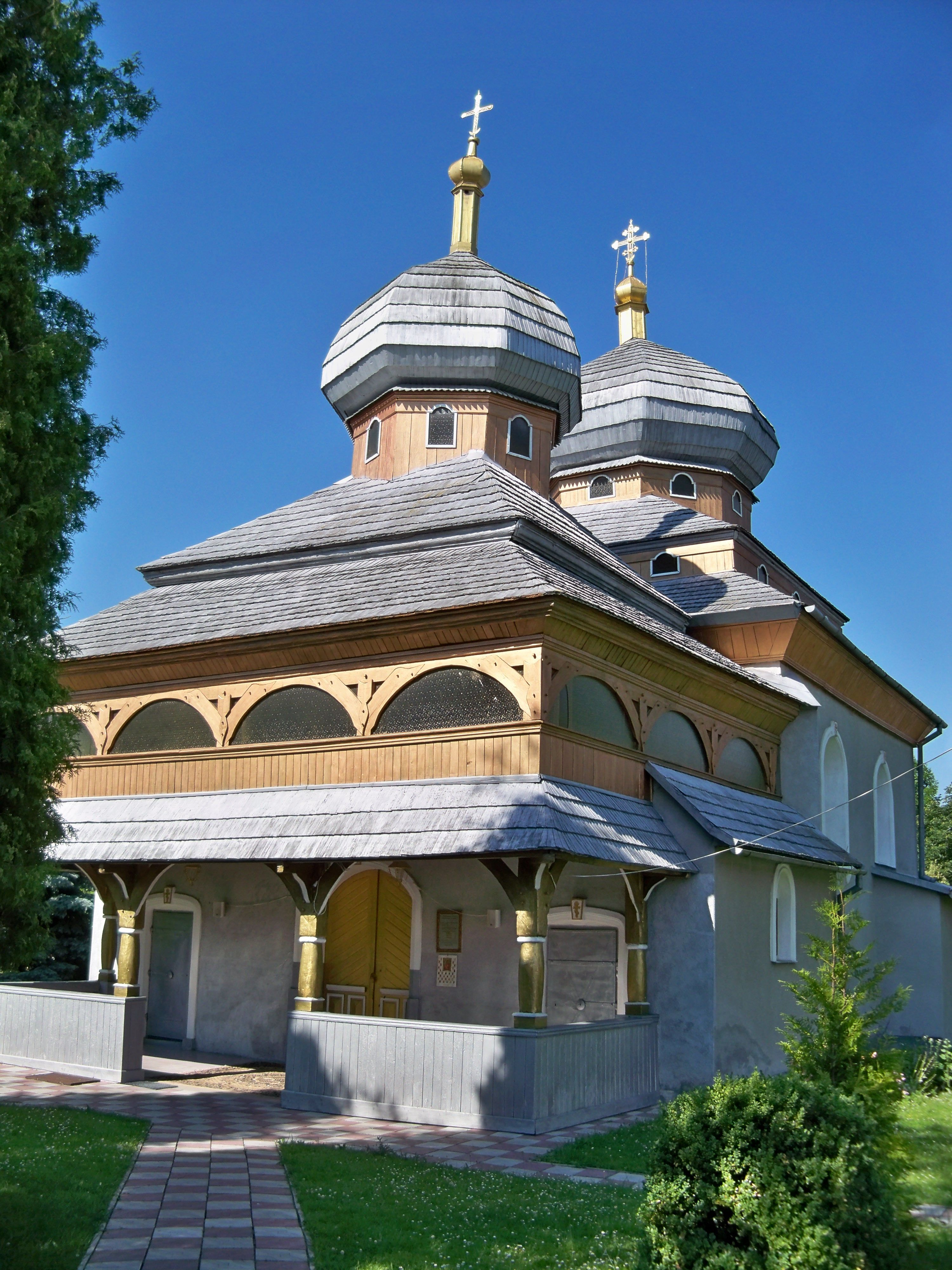
Wooden church of the Holy Trinity

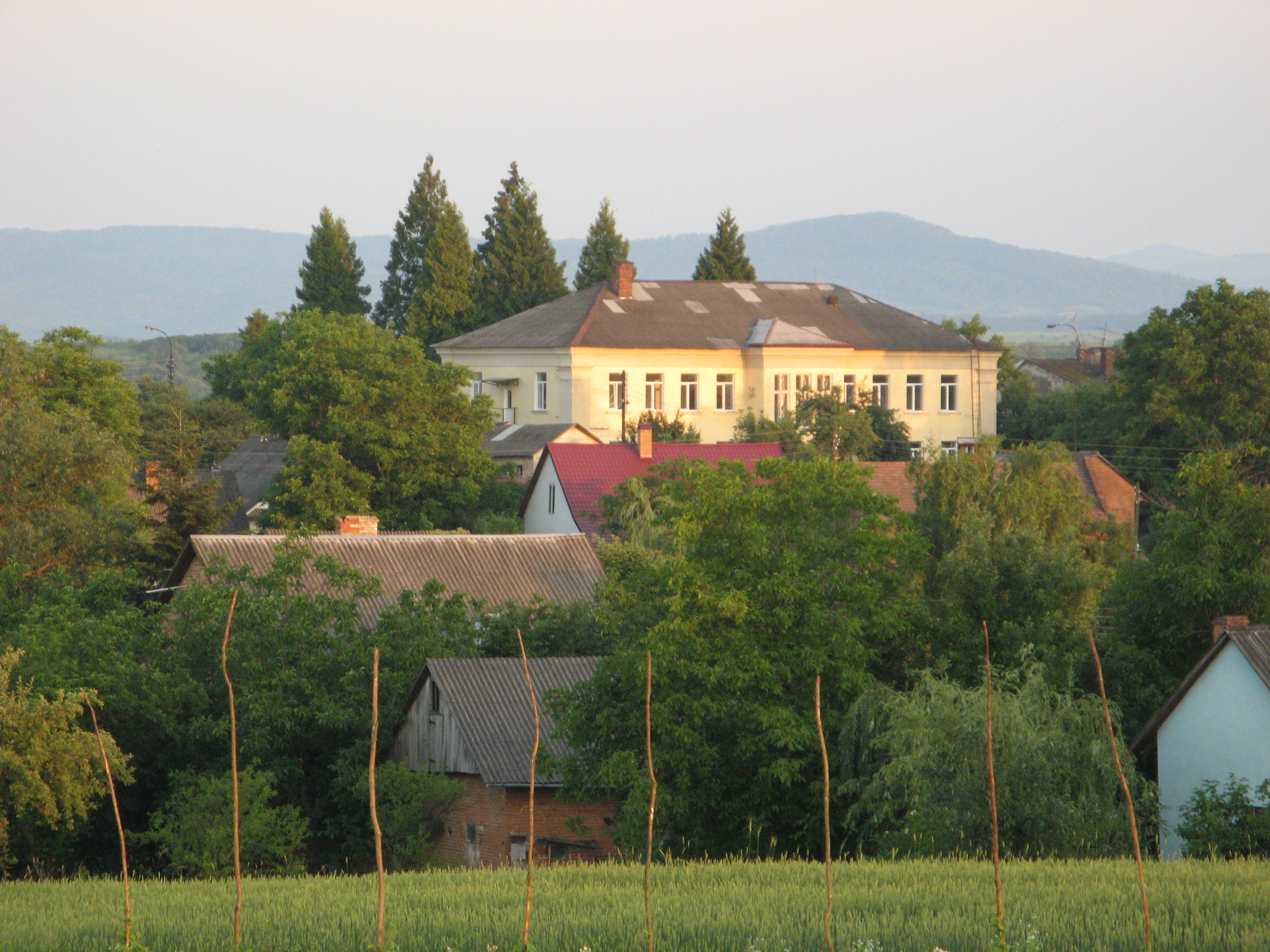
View on the town

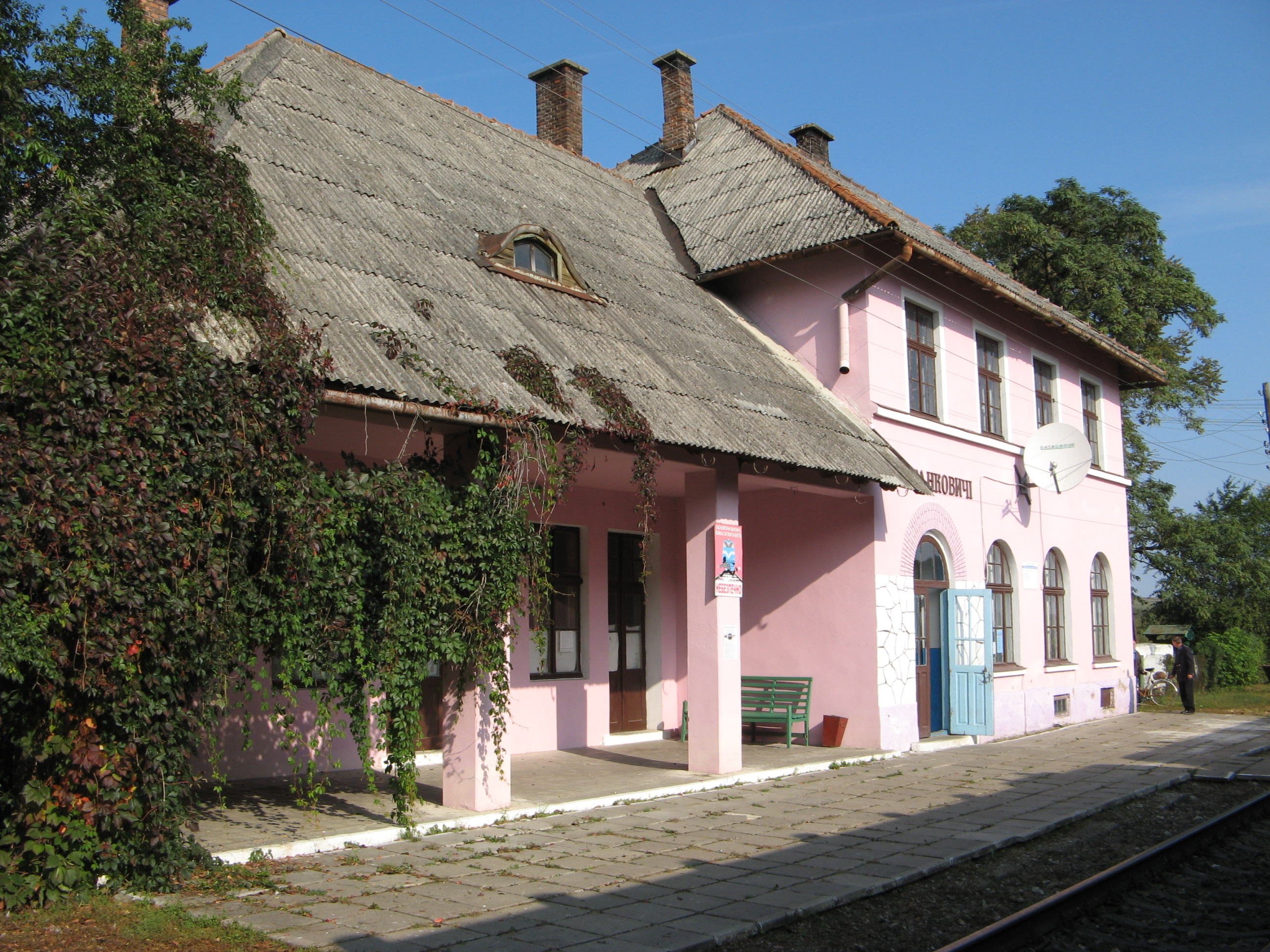
Train station

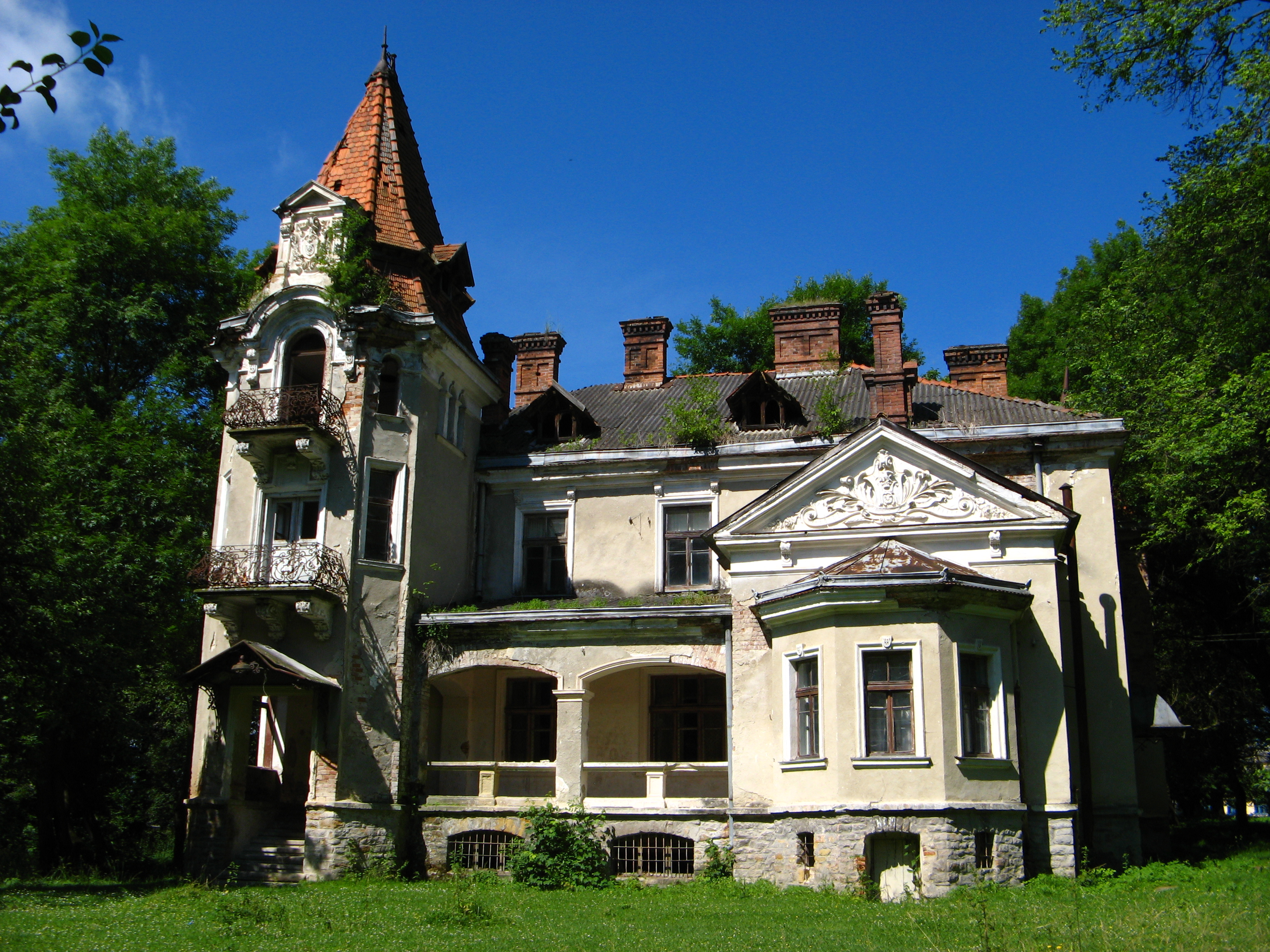
Abandoned palace
