= Dobromyl urban hromada =

Hromada in Lviv Oblast, Ukraine

Dobromyl urban hromada Добромильська міська громада
- Hromada
- Seal
- Interactive map of Dobromyl urban hromada
- Country: Ukraine
- Oblast: Lviv Oblast
- Raion: Sambir Raion
- Admin. center: Dobromyl

Area
  - Total: 2,939 km^{2} (1,135 sq mi)

Population (2021)
  - Total: 19,868
  - Density: 6.760/km^{2} (17.51/sq mi)
- CATOTTG code: UA46080050000015399
- Settlements: 11
- Cities: 1
- Rural settlements: 1
- Villages: 9
- Website: dobromylska-gromada.gov.ua

Dobromyl urban hromada (Ukrainian: Добромильська міська громада) is a hromada in Ukraine, in Sambir Raion of Lviv Oblast. The administrative center is the city of Dobromyl.

== Settlements ==
The hromada consists of 1 city (Dobromyl), 1 rural settlement (Nyzhankovychi) and 35 villages:

- Byblo
- Boloziv
- Bonevychi
- Borshevychi
- Velyke
- Viliunychi
- Horodysko
- Hrabivnytsia
- Hrushatychi
- Hubychi
- Deshychi
- Drozdovychi
- Zorotovychi
- Kniazhpil
- Komarovychi
- Koniv
- Kropyvnyk
- Mihovo
- Mizhenets
- Nyzhnia Vovcha
- Nove Misto
- Patskovychi
- Peredilnytsia
- Pidmostychi
- Poliana
- Posada-Novomiska
- Piatnytsia
- Rozheve
- Sanochany
- Solianuvatka
- Storonevychi
- Ternava
- Tovarna
- Trushevychi
- Chyzhky
