= Dobromyl =

City in Lviv Oblast, Ukraine

Dobromyl Добромиль Dobromil
- City
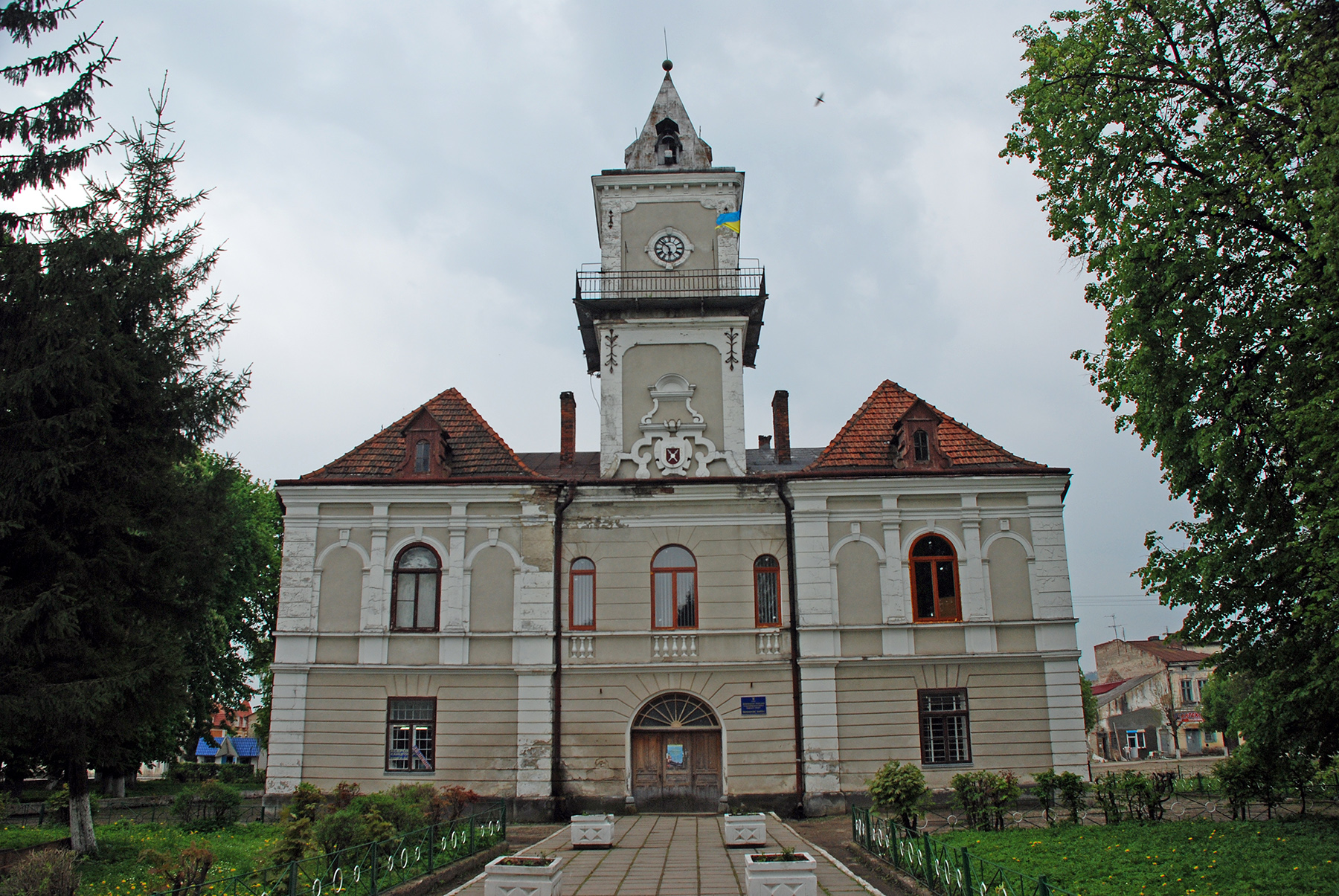
- City hall

- Flag Coat of arms
- Interactive map of Dobromyl
- Location within Lviv Oblast Location within Ukraine
- Coordinates: 49°34′N 22°47′E
- Country: Ukraine
- Oblast: Lviv Oblast
- Raion: Sambir Raion
- Hromada: Dobromyl urban hromada

Area
  - Total: 4.97 km^{2} (1.92 sq mi)

Population (2022)
  - Total: 4,111
  - Density: 827/km^{2} (2,140/sq mi)
- Time zone: UTC+2 (EET)
  - Summer (DST): UTC+3 (EEST)
- Website: dobromylska-gromada.gov.ua

Dobromyl (Ukrainian: Добромиль, IPA: [doˈbrɔmɪlʲ]; Polish: Dobromil) is a city in Sambir Raion, Lviv Oblast, in western Ukraine. It is located some 5 kilometers from the border with Poland. It hosts the administration of Dobromyl urban hromada, one of the hromadas of Ukraine. Population: 4,111 (2022 estimate).

== Geography ==
Dobromyl is located upon the Vyrva river in the Carpathian foothills south of Przemysl.

== History ==
Historical affiliations

Kingdom of Poland 1374–1772
Habsburg monarchy 1772–1918
West Ukrainian People's Republic 1918–1919
Second Polish Republic 1918–1939
Soviet Union 1939–1941 (occupation)
Nazi Germany 1941–1944 (occupation)
Soviet Union 1944–1991
Ukraine 1991–present

Roman coins and remains of an Early Slavic settlement from 4th century AD have been discovered in the area.

Dobromyl was first mentioned in 1374, as a settlement founded by the Herburt family, upon request of Polish prince Władysław Opolczyk. In 1566 King Sigismund I the Old granted Magdeburg town rights and established two annual fairs and a weekly market. Eighteen years later, Stanislaw Herburt built a castle here, the town also had a printing shop, where in 1612 the Annales seu cronici incliti regni Poloniae (The Annals of Jan Długosz) were published. In 1647, a storehouse for imported Hungarian wine was established. Until the First Partition of Poland (1772), Dobromyl was part of Przemyśl Land, Ruthenian Voivodeship, Lesser Poland Province. In the course of time, the branch of the Herburt family which resided in the town changed its name into Dobromil.

In 1772, Dobromyl was annexed by the Habsburg Empire, and until 1918 belonged to Austrian Galicia, remaining a district centre. It was located on the main road connecting Przemyśl with Turka and Hungary. After World War I, the town became Ukrainian and eventually Polish (see Polish–Ukrainian War), and in the Second Polish Republic, was the seat of a county in Lwów Voivodeship. According to the 1921 Polish census, it had a population of 3,431, 50.1% Polish, 37.9% Jewish and 11.1% Ukrainian.

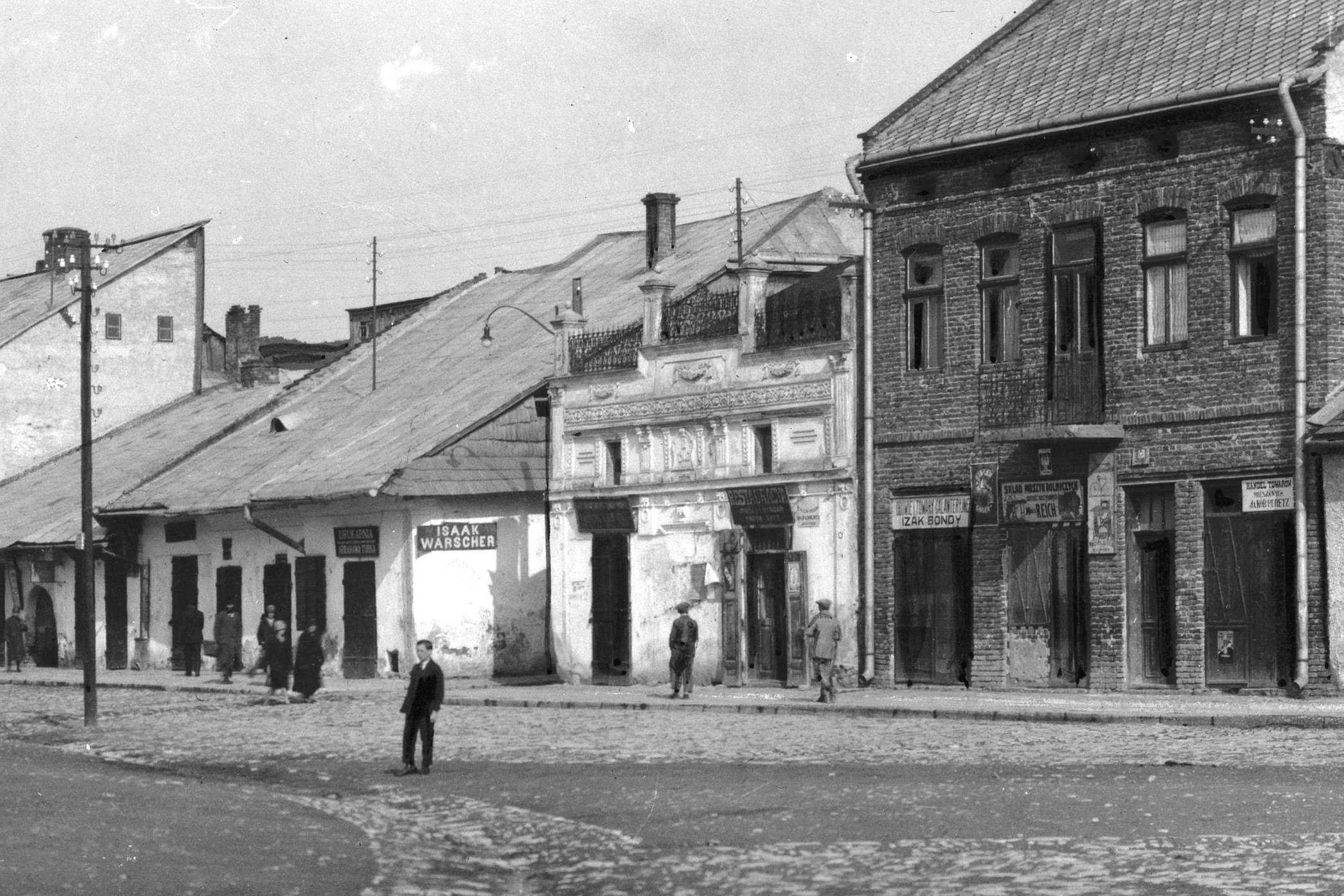
Town center in the interwar period

Following the Nazi and Soviet invasion of Poland, which started World War II in September 1939, Dobromyl was transferred to Soviet Ukraine. In June 1941, soon after the German attack on the USSR, Soviet NKVD murdered hundreds of prisoners who had been evacuated from nearby Przemyśl, dumping their bodies into a salt mine on the outskirts of Dobromyl. Under German occupation, Dobromyl was transferred to Przemyśl County, Kraków District, General Government. On 30 June 1941, members of Einsatzkommando 6 carried out an execution near Dobromyl, killing up to 132 Jews. According to Nazi reports, the victims were accused of being collaborators in NKVD atrocities. While some sources estimate that 132 people were shot, the Dobromil yizkor book reports around 50 Jewish victims. In October 1941, the German occupiers established a Jewish open ghetto. On 29 June 1942, the ghetto was liquidated and most Jews were deported to the Bełżec extermination camp, whereas some 500 stayed in the town, including Judenrat members and Jewish policemen, who bribed the Germans, and were eventually murdered by the occupiers in November 1942. On August 8, 1944 the town was seized by the Red Army.

Under the Soviet rule Dobromyl served as one of the district centers of Drohobych Oblast. Since 1991 Dobromyl has been part of independent Ukraine. The town has a local office of the Association of Polish Culture of the Lviv Land.

Until 18 July 2020, Dobromyl belonged to Staryi Sambir Raion. The raion was abolished in July 2020, as part of the administrative reform of Ukraine, which reduced the number of raions of Lviv Oblast to seven. The area of Staryi Sambir Raion was merged into Sambir Raion.

== Points of interest ==
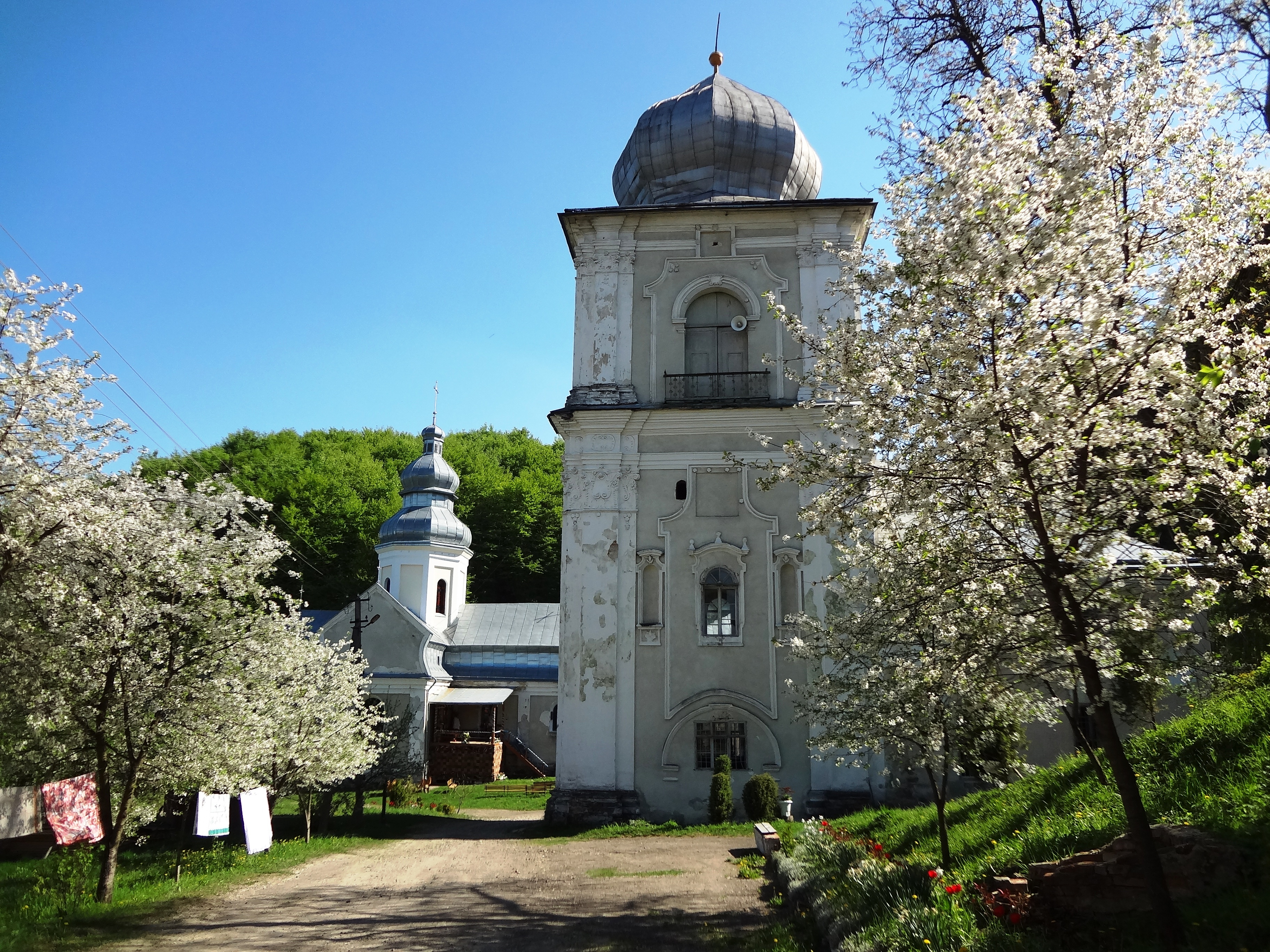
Basilian monastery in Dobromyl

A Basilian monastery in Dobromyl was established in 1612 by Jan Szczęsny Herburt. The modern Rococo building was constructed in 1705. By the late 19th century the convent was in decline, with only two monks and a hegumen residing on its premises, so in 1882 a reform of the cloister took place under supervision of Jesuits. As a result of the reform, the monastery became an important centre of religious education. Among notable personalities who spent time in the cloister were Ukrainian Greek Catholic bishops Soter Ortynsky and Andrey Sheptytsky.

In 2016, a Wall of Remembrance was unveiled on the site of the Jewish cemetery. The memorial was built from more than 150 Jewish tombstones that had been lining the courtyard of a house on Mickiewicz Street since World War II.

== Economy ==
Dobromyl has been known as a centre of salt production, wood industry and brewing.

== Gallery ==
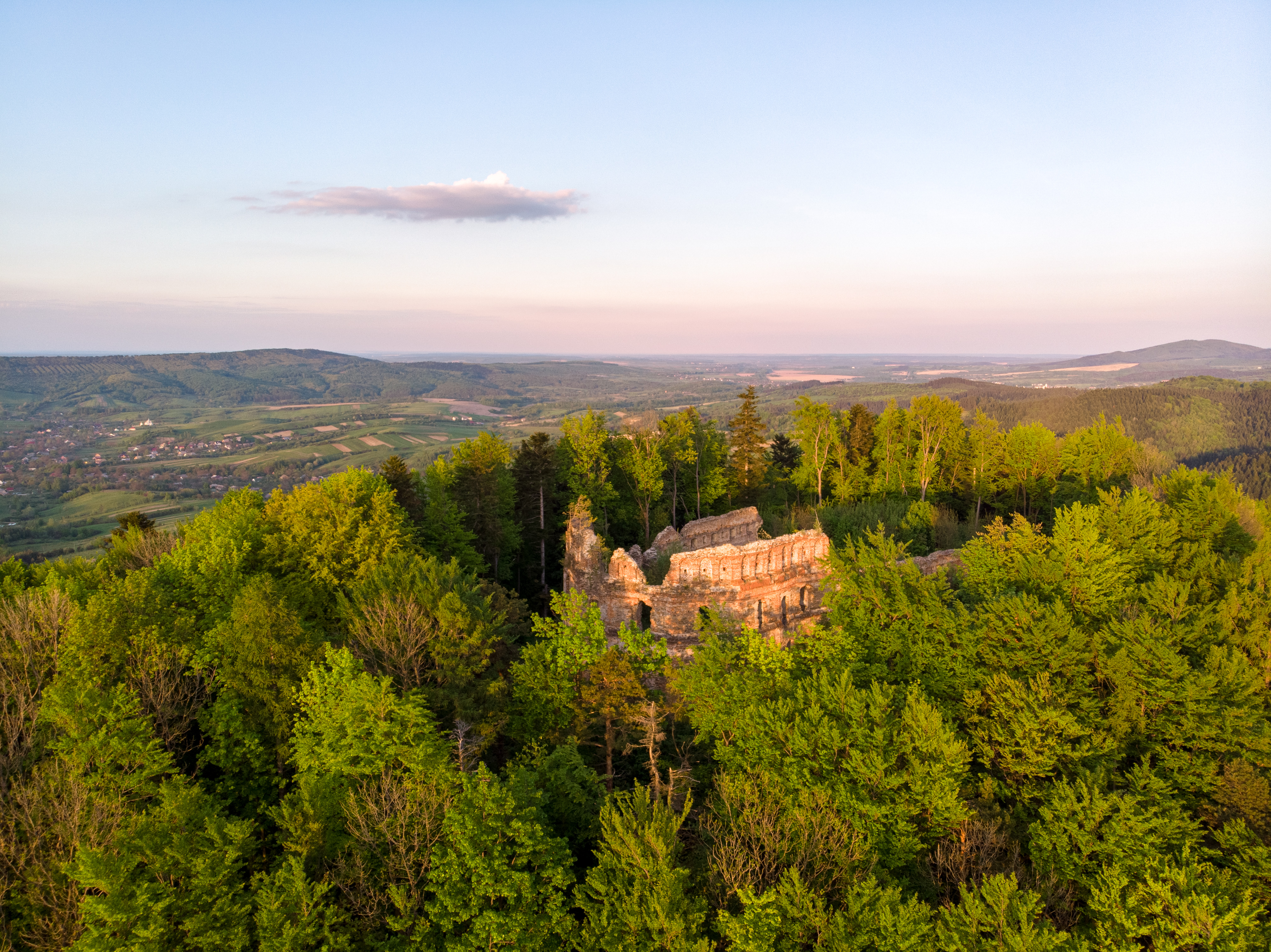
Herburt castle ruins near Dobromyl

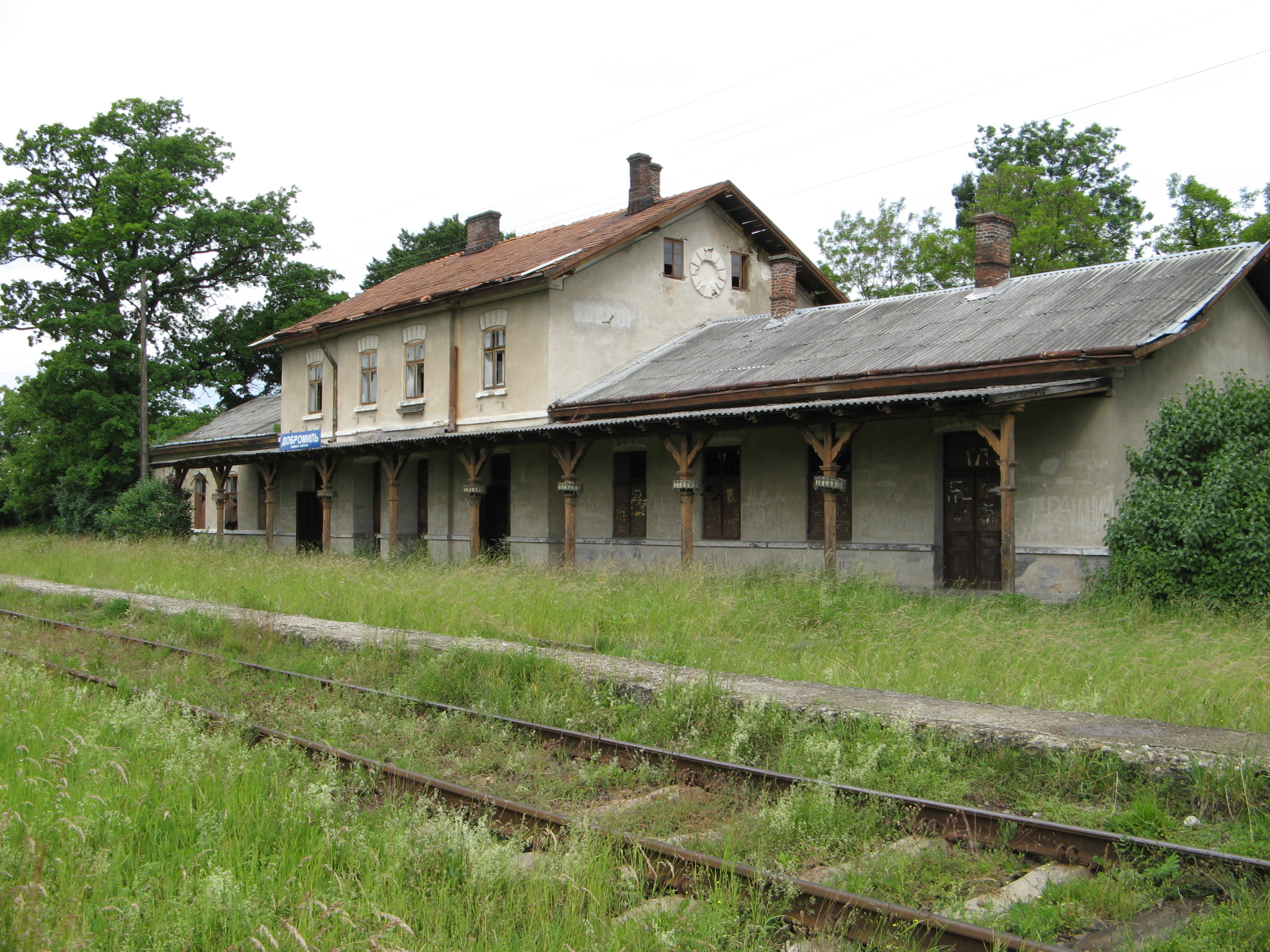
Railway station

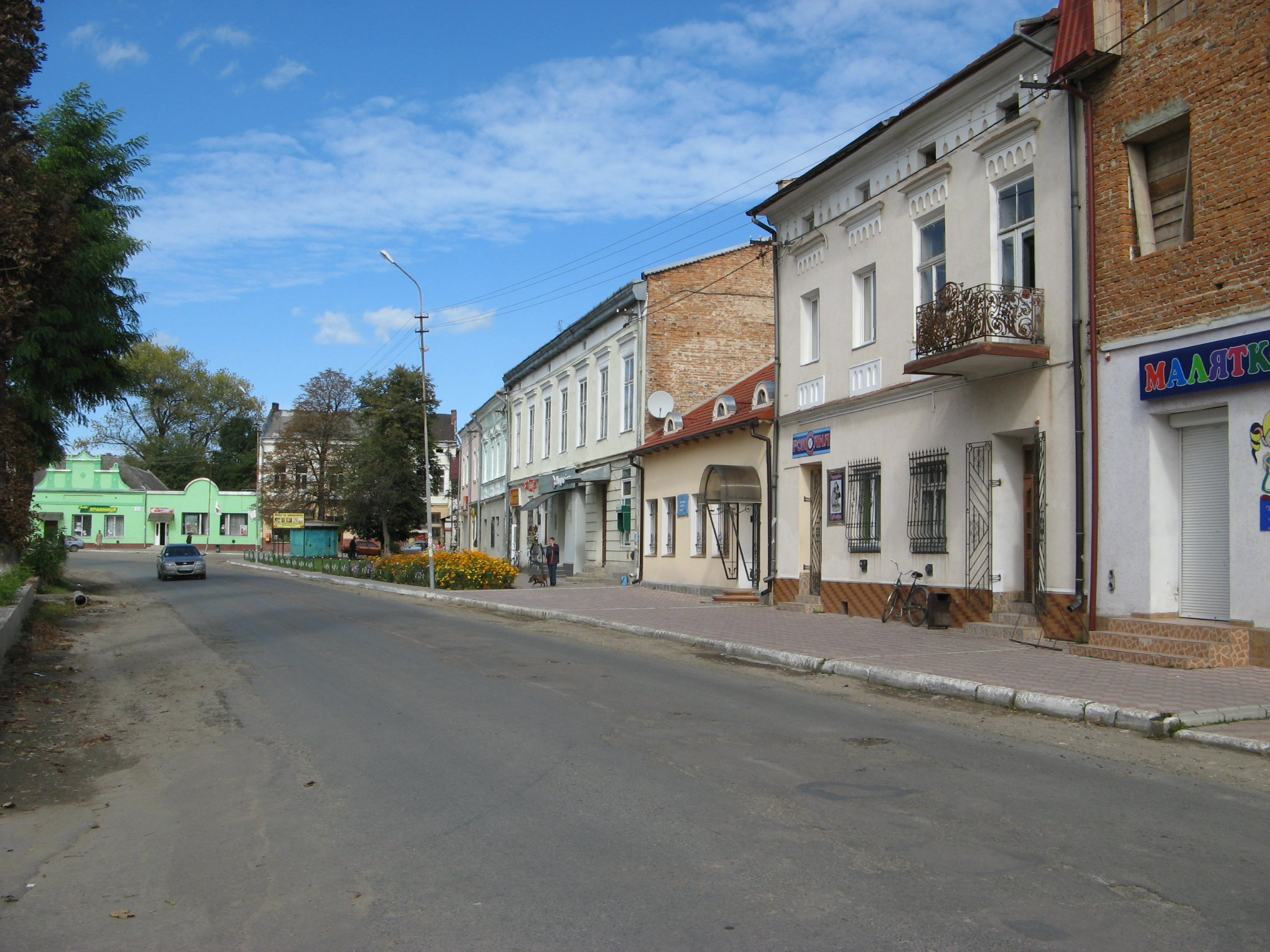
Old houses

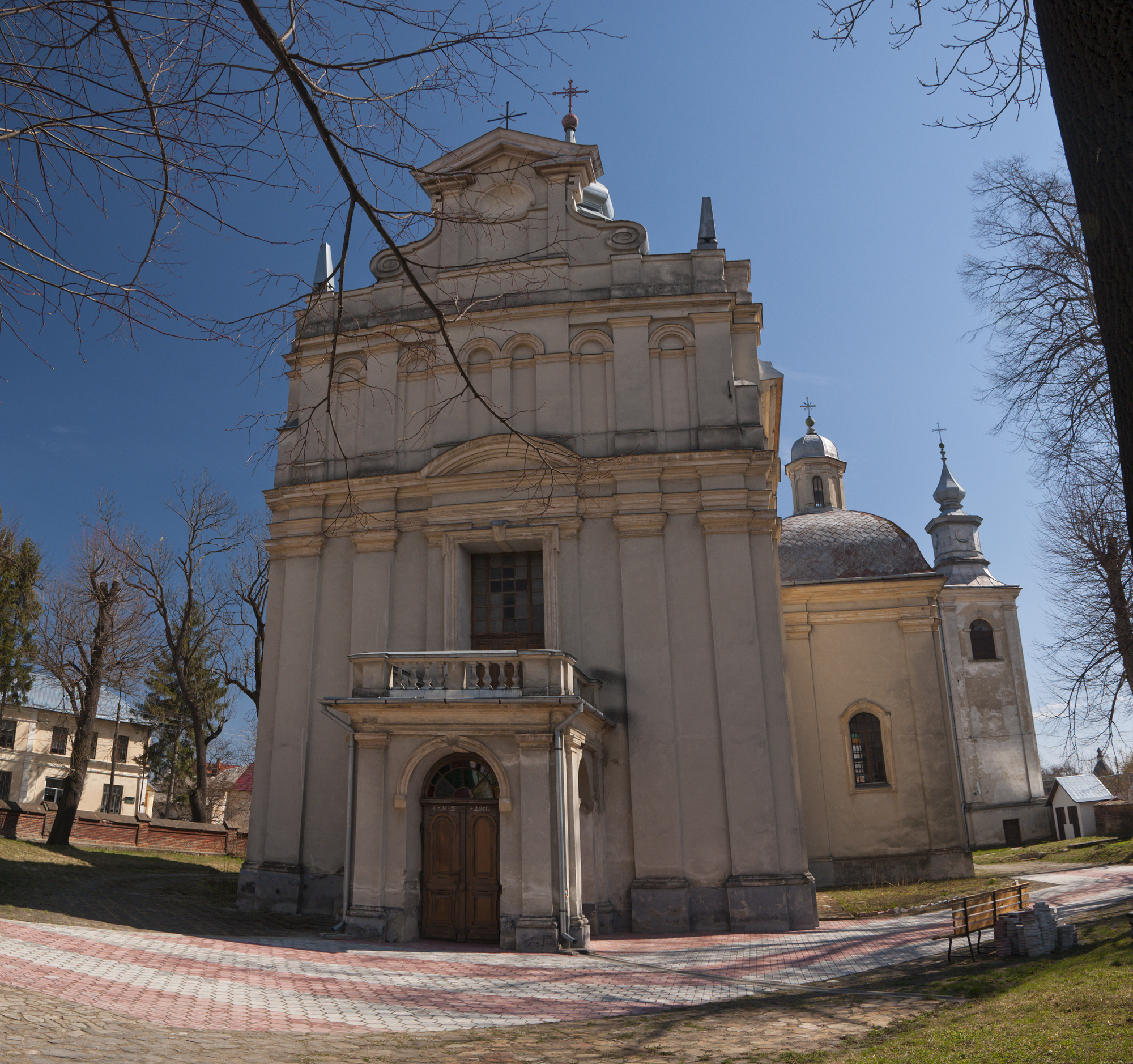
Church of Transfiguration

Jewish cemetery

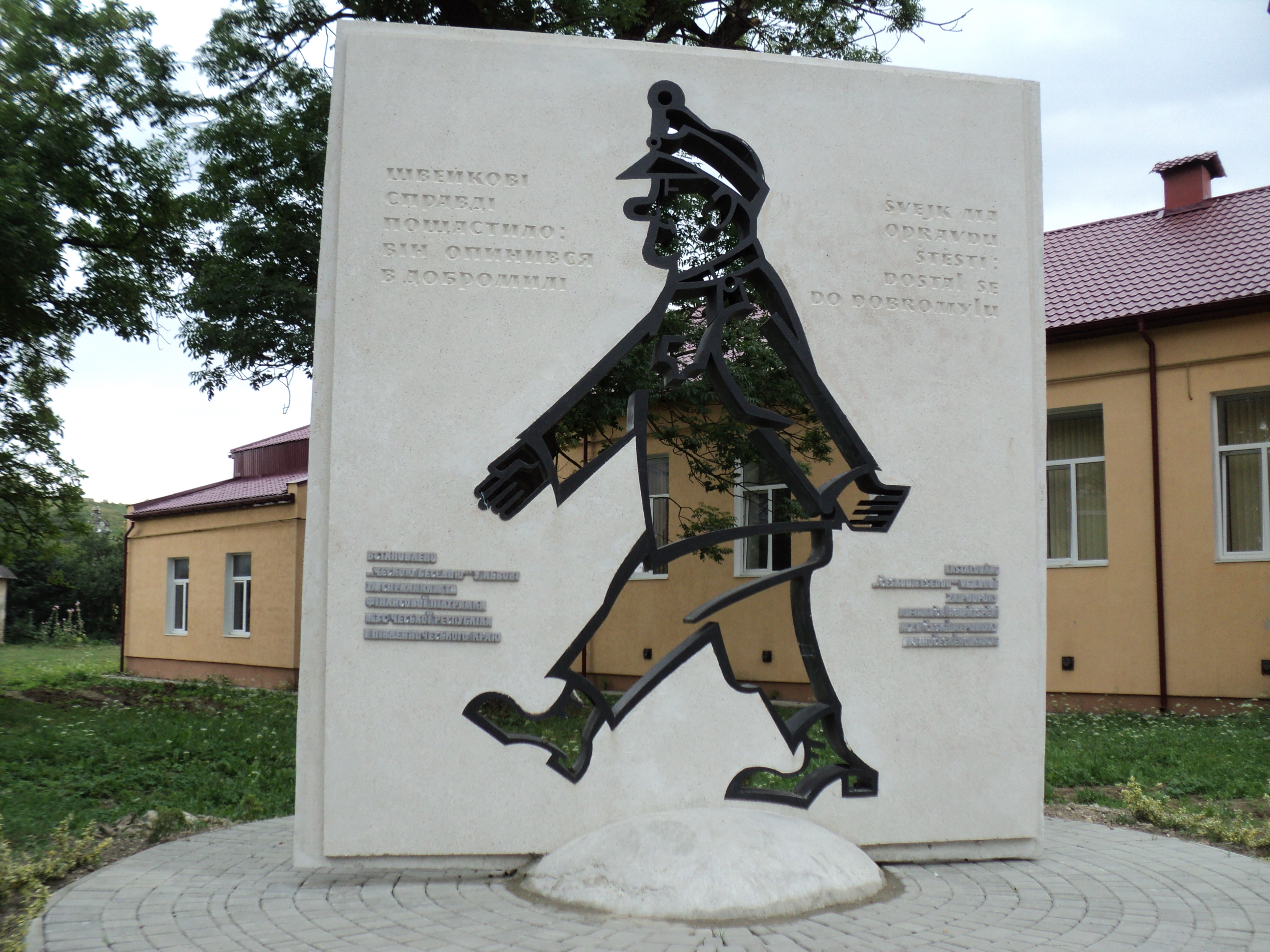
Josef Švejk memorial sign

== Notable people ==
- Physician and major of the Polish Army, Stanislaw van der Coghen, murdered in the Katyn massacre,
- Piotr Geisler, doctor and general of the Polish Army,
- Tadeusz Stanislaw Grabowski, Polish historian and professor of the Jagiellonian University,
- Emil Probst, engineer and academic who promoted reinforced concrete
- Kazimierz Wisniowski, brigade general of the Polish Army.
