= Staryi Sambir Raion =

Former subdivision of Lviv Oblast, Ukraine

Staryi Sambir Raion Старосамбірський район
- Raion
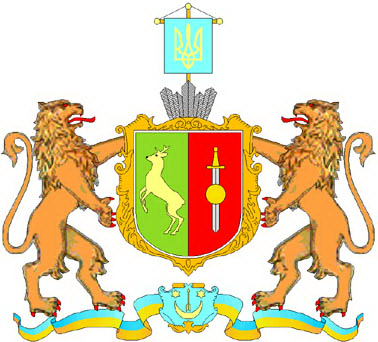
- Flag Coat of arms

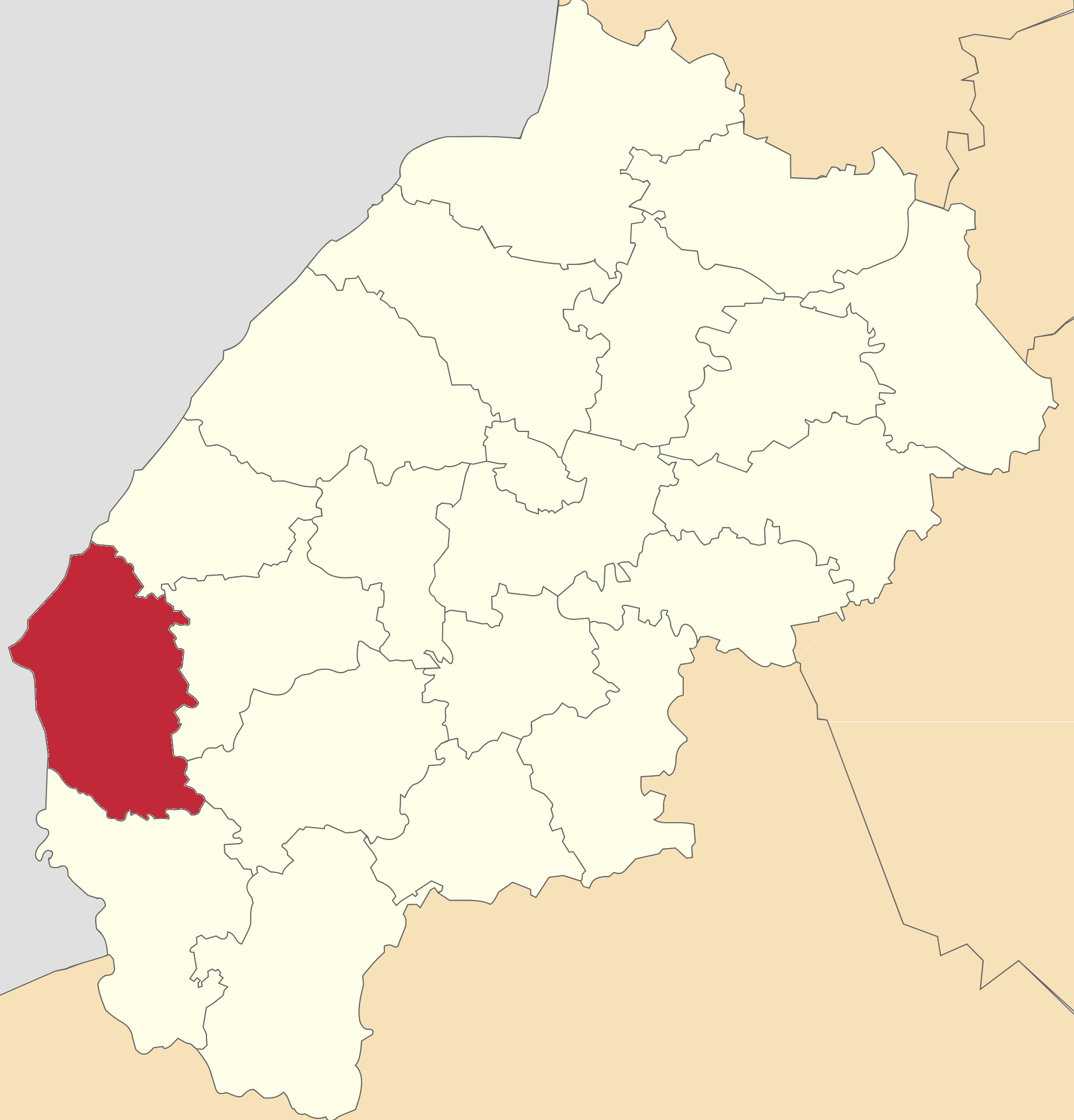
- Coordinates: 49°27′56″N 22°54′35″E
- Country: Ukraine
- Region: Lviv Oblast
- Established: 1944
- Disestablished: 18 July 2020
- Admin. center: Staryi Sambir
- Subdivisions: List: — city councils; — settlement councils; — rural councils; Number of localities: — cities; — urban-type settlements; 110 — villages; — rural settlements

Area
  - Total: 1,245 km^{2} (481 sq mi)

Population (2020)
  - Total: 76,099
  - Density: 61.12/km^{2} (158.3/sq mi)
- Time zone: UTC+02:00 (EET)
  - Summer (DST): UTC+03:00 (EEST)
- Postal index: 82000—82097
- Area code: 380-3238
- Website: http://stsrda.gov.ua/

Staryi Sambir Raion (Ukrainian: Старосамбірський район) was a raion (district) in Lviv Oblast in western Ukraine. Its administrative center was the city of Staryi Sambir. The raion was abolished on 18 July 2020 as part of the administrative reform of Ukraine, which reduced the number of raions of Lviv Oblast to seven. The area of Staryi Sambir Raion was merged into Sambir Raion. The last estimate of the raion population was 76,099 (2020 est.).

At the time of disestablishment, the raion consisted of four hromadas:

- Dobromyl urban hromada with the administration in the city of Dobromyl;
- Khyriv urban hromada with the administration in the city of Khyriv;
- Staryi Sambir urban hromada with the administration in Staryi Sambir;
- Strilky rural hromada with the administration in the selo of Strilky.

== See also ==
- Administrative divisions of Lviv Oblast
