= Poupko =

Poupko is a rabbinic family hailing from Russia. Led by Rabbi Eliezer, Av Beth Din of Velizh, and Pesha, noted female talmudist. All of their children went on to play an important role within world Jewry.

Genealogists speculate that Poupko derives from the Yiddish word meaning «doll» or «figurehead».

Pupko is a very common Lithuanian/Jewish ("Litvak") surname, especially around Lida, now in Belarus, but historically Lithuanian territory. Per the Yizkor of Lida article, "Jewish Family Names of Residents of Lida and Its Neighborhood", by Itchak Ganuz (Ganuzowitsch), translated by Rabbi David Haymowitz: "Some family names' identity is not clear like PUPKO. Such a very common name in Lida according to the famous saying: “Where ever you find a Pupko, you look at a Lida man.” The ending of the family name of the “ko” is very common in the Ukrainian non-Jewish family names."

== Notable people ==
- Eliezer Poupko (1886–1961), Lithuanian rabbi
- Baruch Poupko (1917–2010), son of R. Eliezer
- Rivy Poupko Kletenik, daughter of R. Baruch
- Reuben Joshua Poupko, son of R. Baruch
