= Kletenik =

Kletenik (/kləˈtɛnɪk/ klə-TEN-ik) is a surname. Notable people with the surname include:

- Gilah Kletenik, American scholar and religious leader
- Moshe Kletenik (born 1954), American rabbi
- Rivy Poupko Kletenik, American lecturer and educator
- Pesha Kletenik,American lecturer and educator. Head of School at Manhattan Day School
