= Reuben Joshua Poupko =

Canadian rabbi

Reuben Joshua Poupko is a Canadian-American Orthodox rabbi. He has served as spiritual leader of the Beth Israel Beth Aaron Congregation synagogue in Montreal since 1986, and sits as co-chair of the Centre for Israel and Jewish Affairs' Canadian Rabbinic Caucus.

He has appeared in three films: Schmelvis: The Search for the King's Jewish Roots, a documentary on Elvis Presley's supposed Jewish roots; Once a Nazi, on former Waffen SS soldier-turned-professor Adalbert Lallier; and Untying the Bonds ... Jewish Divorce, a documentary aiming to "increase awareness of the Jewish divorce issue."

== Controversy ==
In an interview with the Montreal Gazette in March 2021, Poupko attributed the upswing of the SARS-CoV-2 Alpha variant in parts of Montreal to the Lubavitch and Sephardic communities, prompting Federation CJA and the Centre for Israel and Jewish Affairs to issue a joint apology.

== Personal life ==
Poupko is the son of Gilda Twerski-Novoseller Poupko and Rabbi Baruch Poupko, rabbi for over sixty years of Congregation Shaare Torah in Pittsburgh. His maternal grandfather was Rabbi Dovid Shlomo Novoseller, and maternal grandmother a descendent of the Twersky rabbinic dynasty.

Poupko is the twin brother of Rivy Poupko Kletenik. He is married to makeup artist Mindy Shear of Montreal, where they reside with her son Shalev. Rabbi Poupko has five children: Adina (married to Hillel Silverberg), Hindy (married to Seth Galena), Tamar (married to Elliot Smith), Eliezer (married to Chany Wilner) and Avi (married to Shifra Valvo).
