= Skelivka =

Village in Lviv Oblast, Ukraine

Skelivka Скелівка
- Village
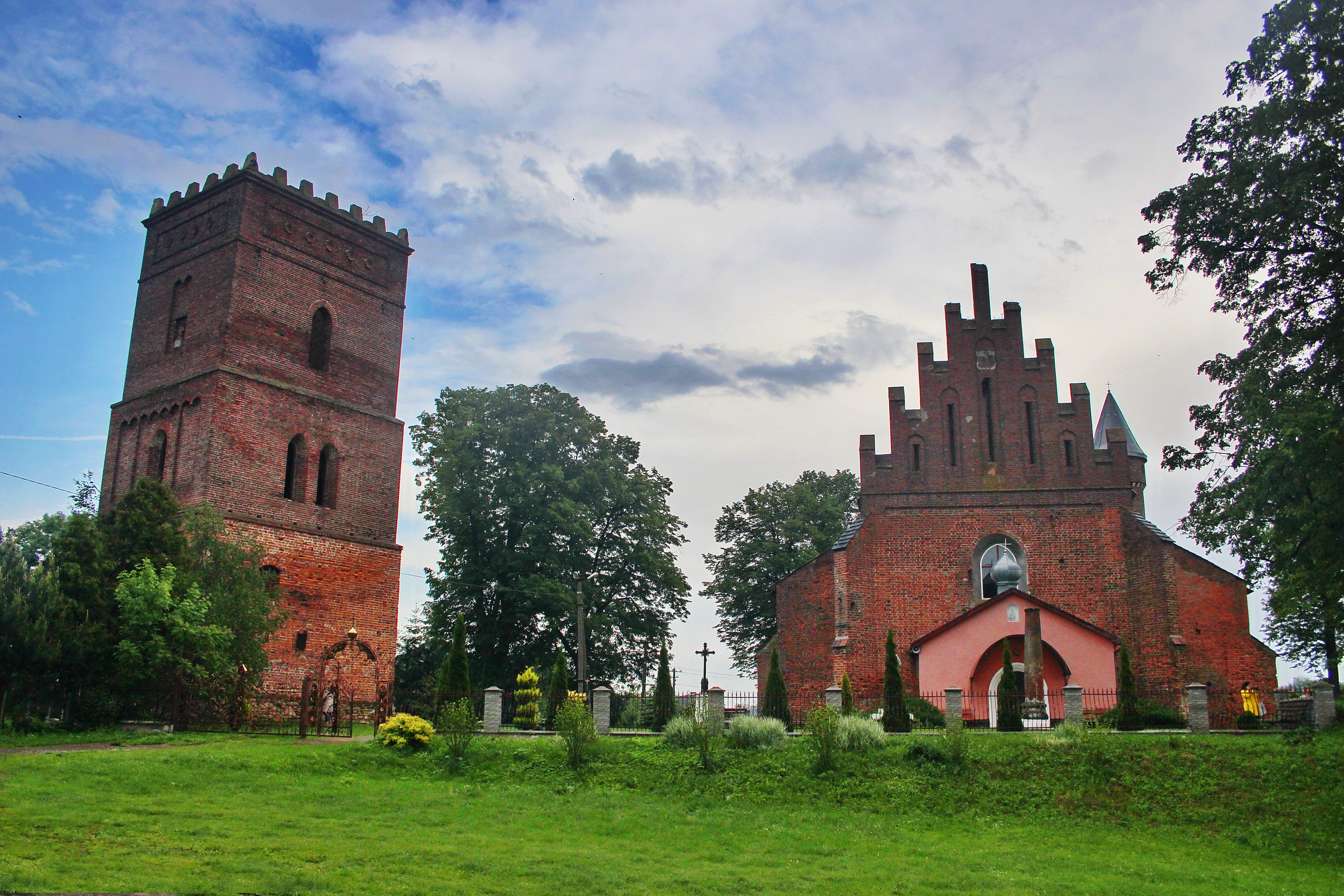
- 16th century church of St. Martin and 14th century tower remaining from the Felsztyn castle

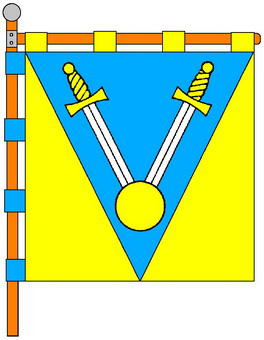
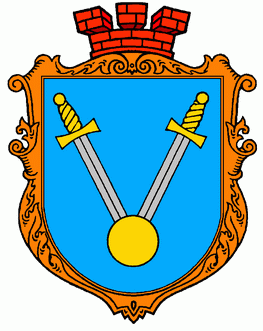
- Flag Seal

- Location in Ukraine Skelivka (Lviv Oblast)
- Coordinates: 49°32′7″N 22°57′45″E
- Country: Ukraine
- Oblast: Lviv Oblast
- Founded: 1374

Area
  - Total: 3.5 km^{2} (1.4 sq mi)
- Elevation: 250 m (820 ft)

Population (2023)
  - Total: 943
- Postal code: 82052

Skelivka (Ukrainian: Скелівка; Polish: Skeliwka) formerly known as Felsztyn, is a village in Lviv Oblast, Sambir Raion, Ukraine on the Strviazh River. It belongs to Khyriv urban hromada, one of the hromadas of Ukraine.

The village is located a few kilometers from the border with Poland, in the eastern part of the Bieszczady Mountains, near the towns of Przemyśl (in southeastern Poland), Khyriv and Stryi (in western Ukraine). It is situated below the main watershed at the foot of the Carpathian Mountains, and has an elevation of 250 meters.

== History ==
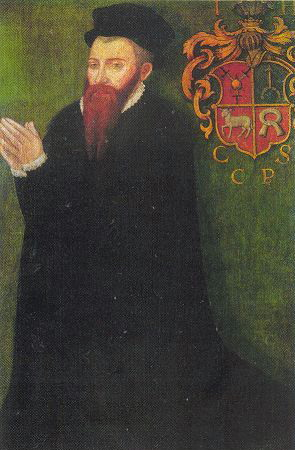
Jan Herburt, Starost of Sanok, owner of Felsztyn

Felsztyn (as the settlement is called in Polish) was founded in 1374 by King Louis I of Hungary (Ludwik Węgierski) on lands granted by Duke Vladislaus II of Opole to the Herburt noble family. It received town privileges under Magdeburg rights in 1380. Additional privileges were granted to the town in 1488 by King Casimir IV Jagiellon and in 1551 by King Sigismund II Augustus.The name was historically variously spelled as Fulsztyn, Folsteyn, Felstin, Fullensteyn, Fulsthine and Fulstin (1593). Its name comes from the town of Bohušov in present day Czech Republic, until 1950 called Fulštejn in Czech, also belonging to the Herburt family. Another Felsztyn was founded in Podolia, today known in Ukrainian as Hvardiiske. Felsztyn was administratively located in the Przemyśl County in the Przemyśl Land in the Ruthenian Voivodeship in the Lesser Poland Province of the Kingdom of Poland.

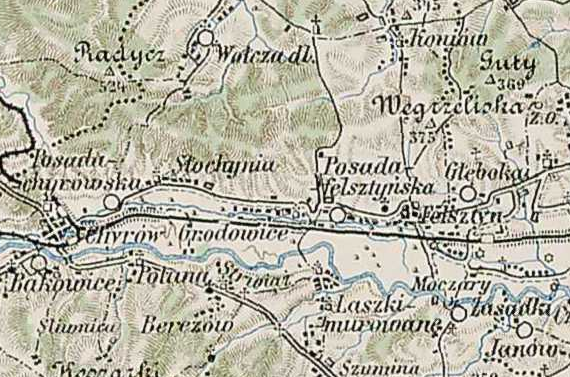
Felsztyn and surrounding villages, in 1889

After the First Partition of Poland, from 1772 to 1918, the town belonged to the Austrian Empire (later the Austro-Hungarian Empire when the double monarchy was introduced in Austria). In 1872 the Dniestr Railway was built through the town from Chyrów, where it connected with the First Hungarian-Galician Railway to Sambor and on to a junction with the Archduke Albrecht Railway in Stryj. The line went on to eventually become a part of the Galician Transversal Railway in 1884. During 1918–1939 Felsztyn was part of the Stary Sambor County of the Lwów Voivodeship in the Second Republic of Poland. According to the 1921 Polish census, the population was 55.9% Polish, 34.4% Jewish and 9.7% Ukrainian.

During the joint German-Soviet invasion of Poland, which started World War II, Felsztyn was occupied by the Soviet Union on September 17, 1939, and then by Nazi Germany from 1941 to 1944. The Jews were killed under German occupation, while the Poles were deported to Siberia in cattle trucks under Soviet occupation. Many of these Poles died in Siberia, some were able to leave Siberia with General Anders Army, while others eventually returned to Felsztyn in 1956 only to find their homes occupied by strangers or demolished. Most surviving Poles were moved to western Poland (mainly Lower Silesia) in the late 1940s and 1950s.

After World War II, some Lemkos from Poland were moved to the renamed Skelivka. Today Skelivka is inhabited by Ukrainians and Lemkos. Until World War II, the town had a Roman Catholic church (and adjacent cemetery) which catered to the Polish population. During Soviet times the church was used as a barn and shed. It is now being restored as a Greek Catholic church. Since the collapse of the Soviet Union in 1991, is part of independent Ukraine.

Historical population
| Year | Pop. | ±% |
|---|---|---|
| 1880 | 920 | — |
| 1921 | 1,195 | +29.9% |
| 1936 | 1,140 | −4.6% |
| 2001 | 1,062 | −6.8% |

Until 18 July 2020, Skelivka belonged to Staryi Sambir Raion. The raion was abolished in July 2020 as part of the administrative reform of Ukraine, which reduced the number of raions of Lviv Oblast to seven. The area of Staryi Sambir Raion was merged into Sambir Raion.

== Transport ==
A railway station of the Zagórz-Khyriv-Dobromyl railroad is located in Skelivka.

== In culture ==
Felsztyn is passingly mentioned in the famous Czech novel The Good Soldier Švejk by Jaroslav Hašek, and has been included in a tourist route The Trail Of The Good Soldier Švejk.

== Notable people ==
- Walenty Herburt (1524 – 1572), Bishop of Przemyśl
- Jan Herburt (1524–1577), royal secretary
- Sebastian z Felsztyna (c.1480–1490 – after 1543), Polish composer and music theorist,
- Dovid Shlomo Novoseller (1877-1966), rabbi and philanthropist
