= Kamil Giżycki =

Polish writer

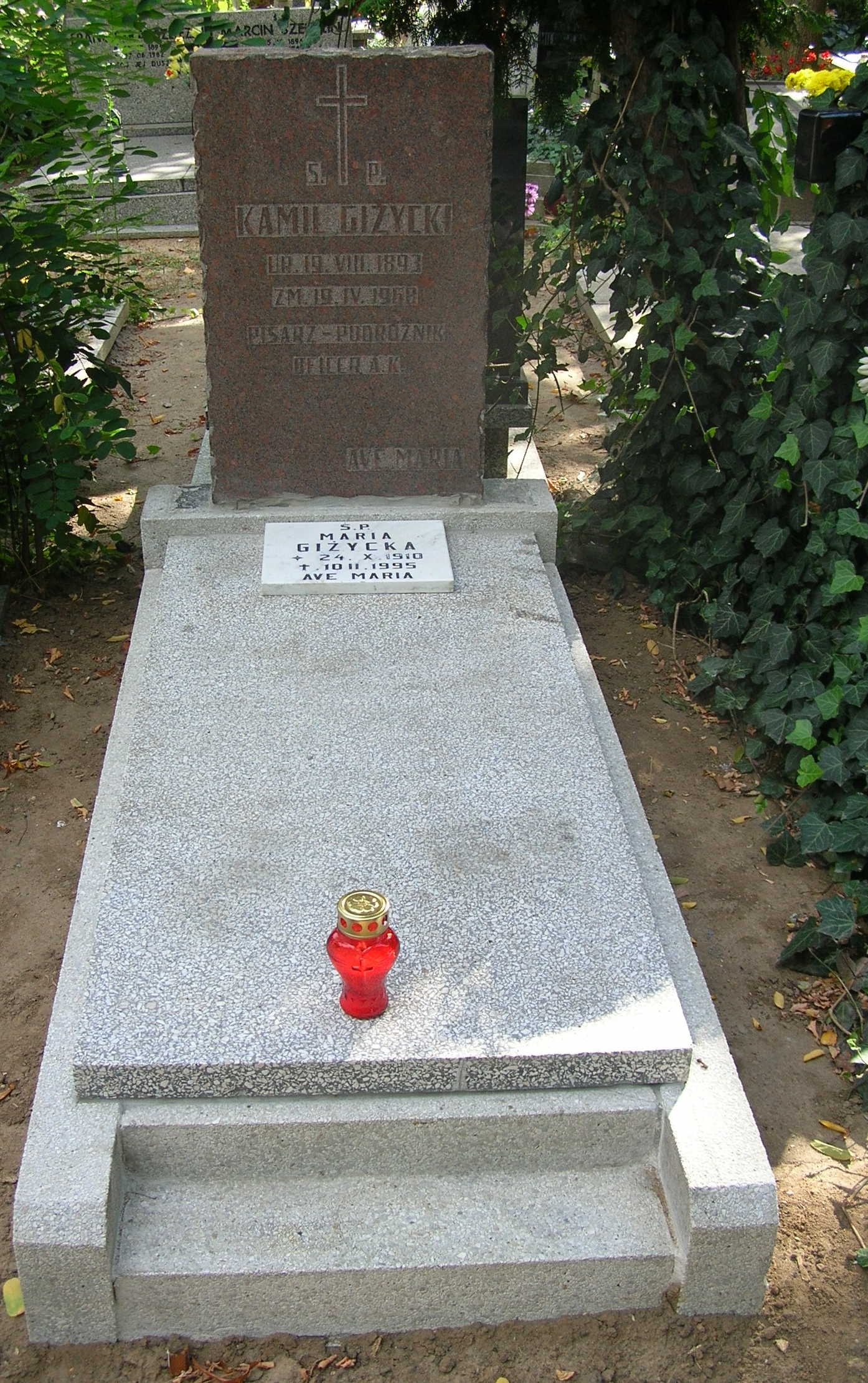
Tomb of Kamil Giżycki, Wrocław.

Kamil Giżycki (19 August 1893, at Grybów – 19 April 1968, at Wrocław) was a Polish writer, traveler, engineer, and soldier for Austria-Hungary during World War I, the Polish Siberian Brigade during the Polish–Soviet War, the White Army during the Russian Civil War, and, later, the Polish Home Army during the Invasion of Poland.

== Biography ==
=== Education ===
Giżycki studied at the famous Jesuit school Zakład Naukowo-Wychowawczy Ojców Jezuitów w Chyrowie in Khyriv. He graduated from Technical University of Munich.

=== Military career ===
==== World War I ====
During World War I he served in Austro-Hungarian army and he was injured and captured by Russian soldiers. As a prisoner of war Giżycki was sent to Siberia.

==== Polish-Soviet War ====
After the outbreak of the February Revolution of 1917, Giżycki served in Czechoslovak Legions, but later joined the Polish 5th Division in January 1919, with whom he fought against the Bolsheviks.

==== Russian Civil War and the White movement ====
In January 1920, after surrender of the 5th Division, Giżycki joined the White movement guerrillas in Uriankhai. Sometime between c. 1920~1921 he moved to north-western Outer Mongolia and he joined baron Roman Ungern von Sternberg's army, the Asiatic Cavalry Division, as an officer and engineer. He also briefly became Ungern von Sternberg's political advisor and chief of engineer troop, which manufactured land mines, hand grenades, chemical warfare, etc.

Giżycki took part in Ungern's last campaign to against the Bolsheviks in Transbaikalia, participating in their march across the mountains separating Mongolia from Russia, their battles against the overwhelming numerical superiority of the Bolshevik forces, and their final retreat from near Ulan-Ude in Buryatia back to Mongolia, where near the Egiin Gol River the baron's exhausted army collapsed on 17–18 August 1921, and baron was betrayed by two Russian officers who handed him over to the Bolsheviks.

Giżycki together with part of the 2nd Brigade of Ungern's army, pursued by the Red Army, retreated fighting both the enemy and the elements from north-central Mongolia, south of Urga, and then through northern Gobi to Chinese Manchuria. There, like the rest of the officer corps of the 2nd Ungern's Brigade, he joined the Chinese forces and served as a military instructor in army of Zhang Zuolin; he was later employed as an engineer of the Chinese Eastern Railway.

In summer 1922, Giżycki joined the army of White Russian general Anatoly Pepelyayev.

==== Interwar period and the Polish Defensive War ====
In 1923, Giżycki returned to Poland and settled near Lviv. In 1926, he joined an expedition to western Africa headed by Ferdynand Antoni Ossendowski. In 1934, Giżycki settled in Liberia where he bought a plantation.

Just before Polish Defensive War, in 1939, Giżycki returned to Poland and took part in fight against Germany as an officer of the Polish Home Army.

=== Later life ===
After the war, Giżycki lived at Wrocław and published numerous novels about Africa. He died in Wrocław on 19 April, 1968.

== Published books ==
Giżycki was a prolific writer of books and articles, and his recollections about his life during the 1920-21 in southern Siberia and Mongolia are important primary sources about the Mongolia and its inhabitants prior to the establishment of the Mongolian People's Republic, the life and last campaign of general Ungern-Sternberg, and flora and fauna of Central Asia.

- Polowania egzotyczne, 1927, Wyd. Zakł. Narodowy im. Ossolińskich, Lwów.
- Przez Urianchaj i Mongolię. Wspomnienia z lat 1920-21 (through Urianchai and Mongolia. Recollection of 1920–21 years), (1929 Dom Książki Polskiej, Lwów: Zakł. Narodowy im. Ossolińskich; 2007 and 2011 Wyd. LTW)
- Ze Wschodu na Zachód. Listy z podróży, 1930 „Księg. Polska" Tow. Polskiej Macierzy Szkolnej, Warszawa
- Przez knieje i stepy, 1930 and 1938, Księg. św. Wojciecha Poznań.
- Wielkie czyny szympansa Bajbuna Mądrego 1947 - Wydaw. Polskie R. Wegner, Toruń : Toruńskie Zakłady Graficzne; 1960 Warszawa : "Nasza Księgarnia"; 2007 - Warszawa : Polityka. Spółdzielnia Pracy; also German version: Die grossen Taten des Schimpansen Beybun Hofberater seiner Majestät des Königs Simba : Negermärchen. 1957, Berlin, A. Holz)
- Wężowa Góra, opowieści z puszczy liberyjskiej, 1958; 1975 Zakład Narodowy im. Ossolińskich
- Na Samotnym Atolu, 1958 (German version: Berlin, 1960, 1964, 1966 Das einsame Atoll A. Holz; 1962 Verlag Kultur und Fortschritt)
- Nil, rzeka wielkiej przygody, 1959, 1972, 1983 (Nasza Księgarnia, Warszawa)
- Listy z archipelagu Salomona "Ossolineum", Wrocław; also Russian version (Pisma s Solomonovyh ostrovov, Nauka, Moscow, 1974) and Latvia version (Vēstules no Zālamana salām Riga : "Zinātne", 1979)
- Hebanowa miłość, 1960 Zakład Narodowy im. Ossolińskich, Wrocław,
- Hevea płacze kauczukiem, 1962 Wyd. Śląsk.
- Lwica Uanga 1969 and 1980 (Nasza Księgarnia, Warszawa); also in Lithuanian Liūtė Uanga : apsakymai (Vilnius, Vaga 1966)
- W pogoni za Mwe, 1966, 1973, 1983 (Nasza Księgarnia, Warszawa)
- W puszczach i sawannach Kamerunu, Nasza Księgarnia, 1966, 1970, 1975, 1986

== Bibliography ==
- Michałowski W., 1977. Testament barona.
- Michałowski W., 1990. Tajemnica Ossendowskiego.
- Biograms of Kamil Giżycki in his books: Przez Urianchaj i Mongolię, (1929) and Przez knieje i stepy, 1930.
