= Gilah Kletenik =

American Jewish cleric and academic

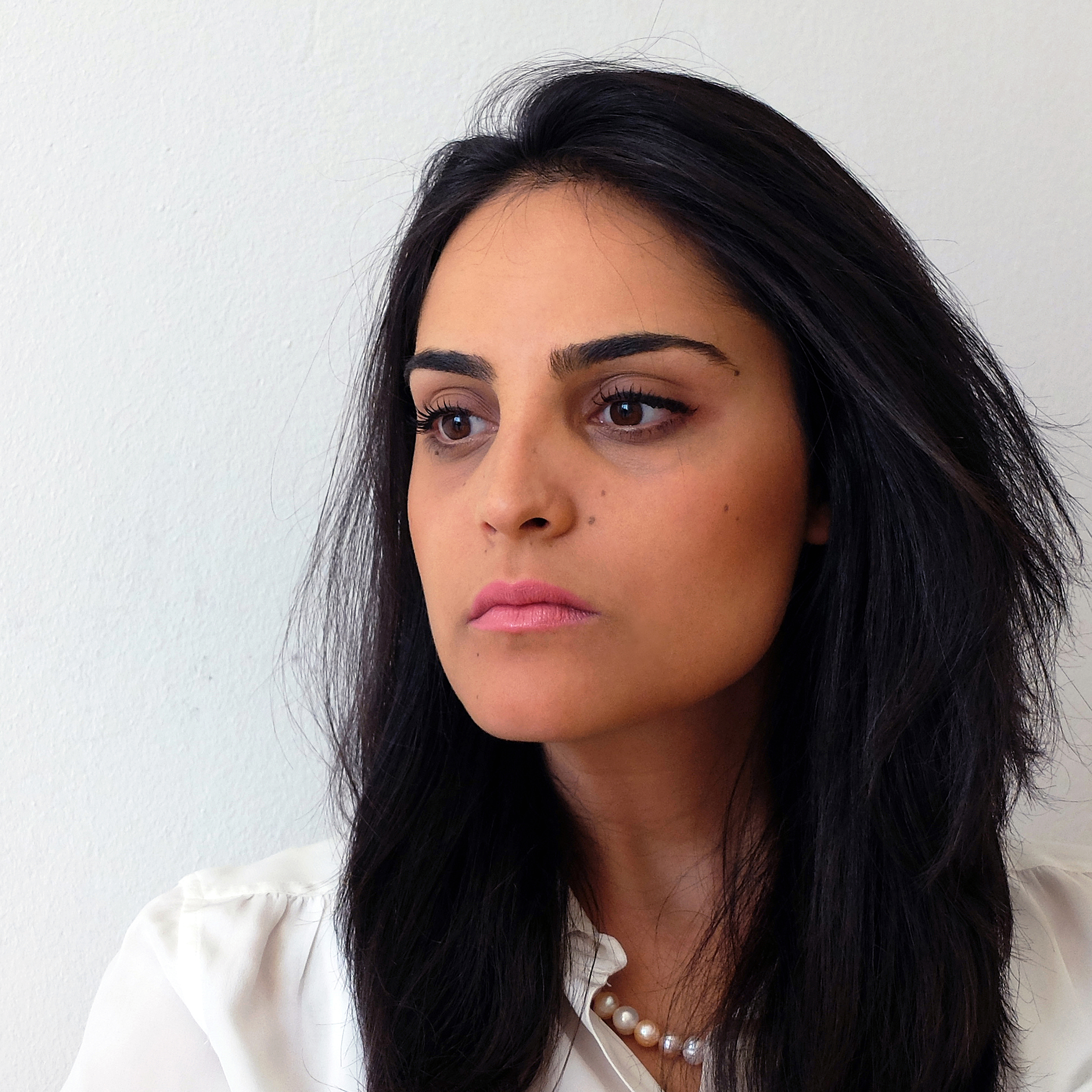
- Kletenik, 2013
- Occupation: Congregational Scholar

Gilah Kletenik is an academic and Open Orthodox rabbi.

== Education ==
Kletenik grew up in Seattle, Washington, where she attended the Seattle Hebrew Academy and later Northwest Yeshiva High School, from which she graduated in 2005.

She studied at Migdal Oz (seminary) of Yeshivat Har Etzion in Israel, and graduated summa cum laude from the Honors Program at Stern College for Women in 2009. As a student leader, in response to the Agriprocessors meat scandal, she organized a panel on ethics and the laws of Kashrut. Kletenik subsequently suggested that the foundation of the biblical laws of kosher are essentially ethical, that "the earth is not yours to plunder". Her Senior Honors Thesis was entitled To Judge or Not Judge: Women's Eligibility to Serve as Judges: an Exploration of the Biblical, Tannaitic, Amoraic and Tosafist Literature.

In 2011, Kletenik earned a Master of Arts degree in Biblical and Talmudic Interpretation from the Graduate Program for Women in Talmud at Yeshiva University. While at Yeshiva, she was one of the leaders of the Social Justice Society of Yeshiva University, which The Forward called part of "a boom in Orthodox social activism among the young".

She also studied Jewish philosophy at Yeshiva University's Bernard Revel Graduate School of Jewish Studies.

Kletenik earned a Ph.D. in the Hebrew and Judaic Studies Department at New York University.

== Career ==
Kletenik is a Starr Fellow at Harvard University. She has written about Jewish studies and other topics.

Previously she was a congregational scholar at the Modern Orthodox Congregation Kehilath Jeshurun on the Upper East Side of Manhattan. During her tenure at Kehilath Jeshurun, which concluded in 2014, Kletenik was among a few Orthodox women worldwide functioning as religious leaders. Kletenik has been a vocal advocate of advancing women as rabbis and clergy, notably suggesting as much in a public sermon. She has written about this position, which has been deemed controversial, in the Huffington Post. Kletenik has also written on political affairs, which she considers through a philosophical lens, most recently opining on ISIS in 3:AM Magazine. Working towards a more egalitarian Jewish leadership landscape, she is also a founder of the Orthodox Women’s Leadership Project.

Kletenik is one of The Jewish Week’s "36 under 36", an inaugural recipient of The Covenant Foundation’s Pomegranate Prize, and a Wexner Foundation Graduate Fellow.

Kletenik was the first female high-school-level Talmud teacher at the Ramaz School and has advocated for equality in Jewish learning. Kletenik has lectured and taught at Yeshivat Chovevei Torah, Mechon Hadar, JOFA, and the Drisha Institute.

Kletenik interned on Capitol Hill for Congressman Gary Ackerman.

In 2013, she was exhibited at the Jewish Museum Berlin in Jew in the Box.

In 2014, Kletenik was included on the list "radical Jews you really need to know".

== Personal life ==
Kletenik is the daughter of Moshe Kletenik and Rivy Poupko Kletenik, and the granddaughter of Baruch Poupko. She is married to Rabbi Samuel Klein.
