= Grunwald alley =

- Грюнвальдська алея
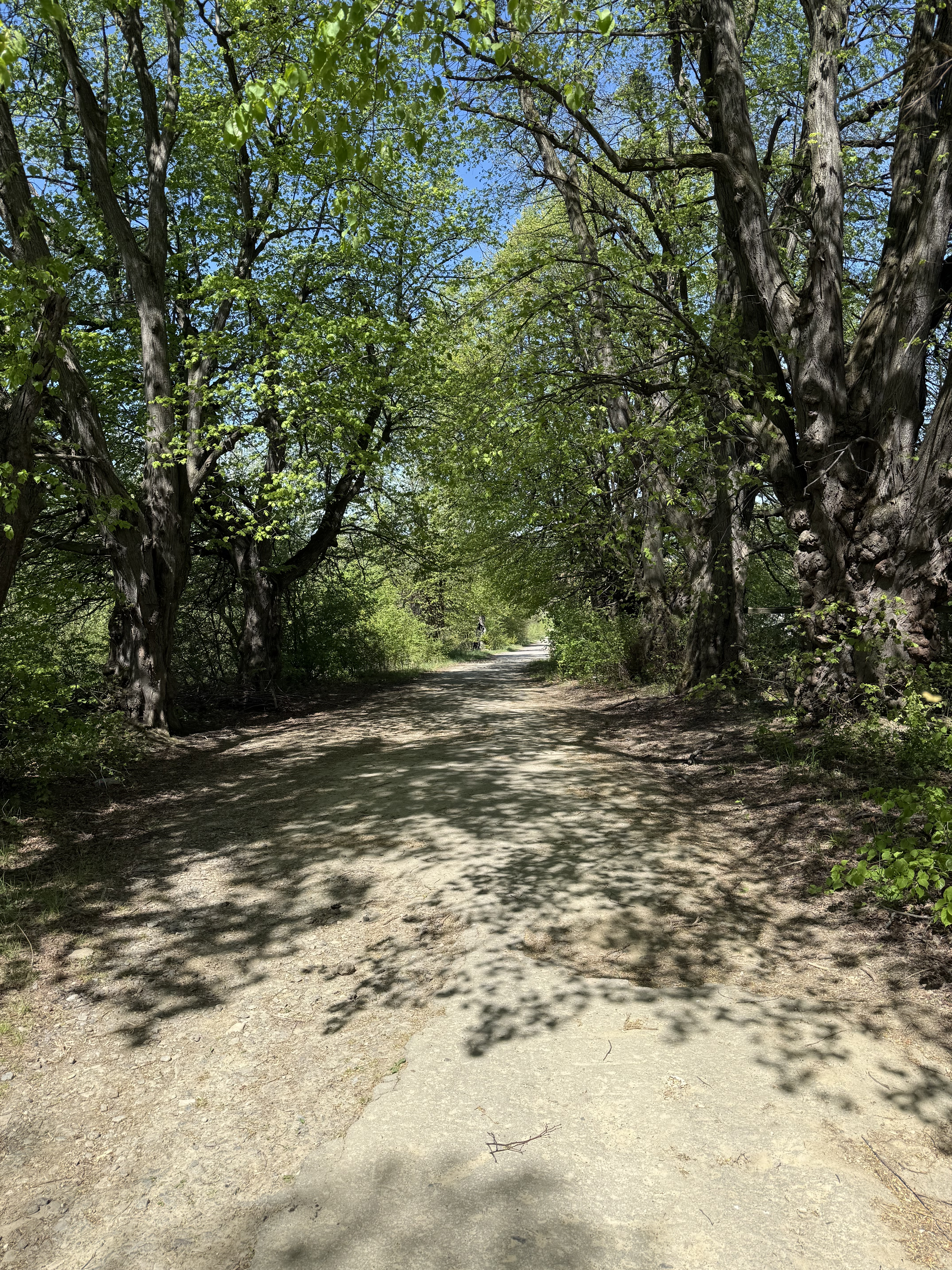
- Interactive map of Grunwald alley
- Type: alley
- Nearest city: Khyriv
- Established: 1911

Grunwald alley a historic linden alley that was planted near the Jesuit College in Khyriv as a tribute to 500th anniversary of the battle of Grunwald

== History ==
The alley was planted in 1911 near the renowned Jesuit College in the town of Khyriv, the teritorry of the college was enormous for such a small town as Khyriv, approximately 250ha (618 acres).

120 trees were planted in total, 100 of which were lindens and the rest were oak trees.

== Gallery ==
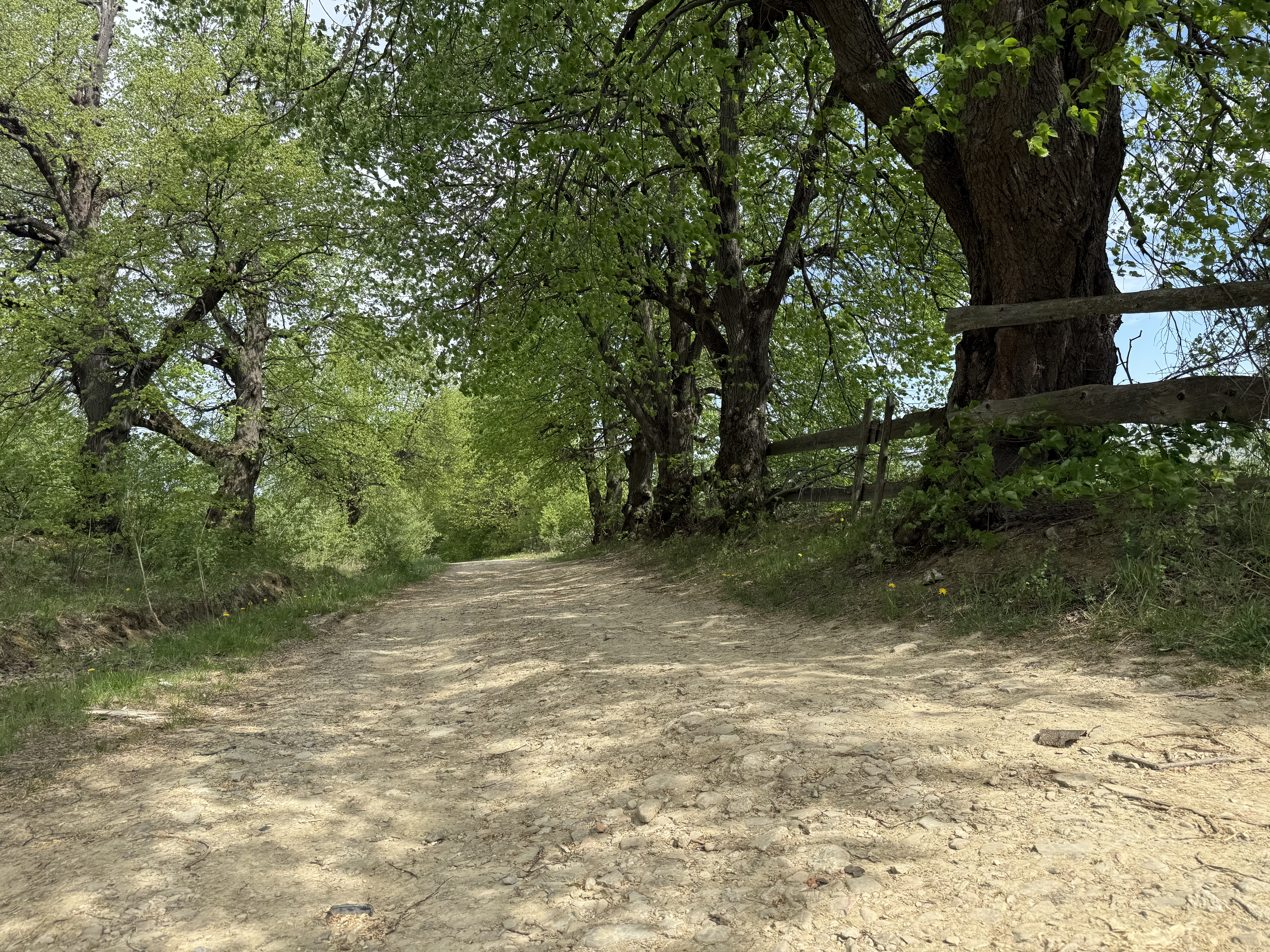

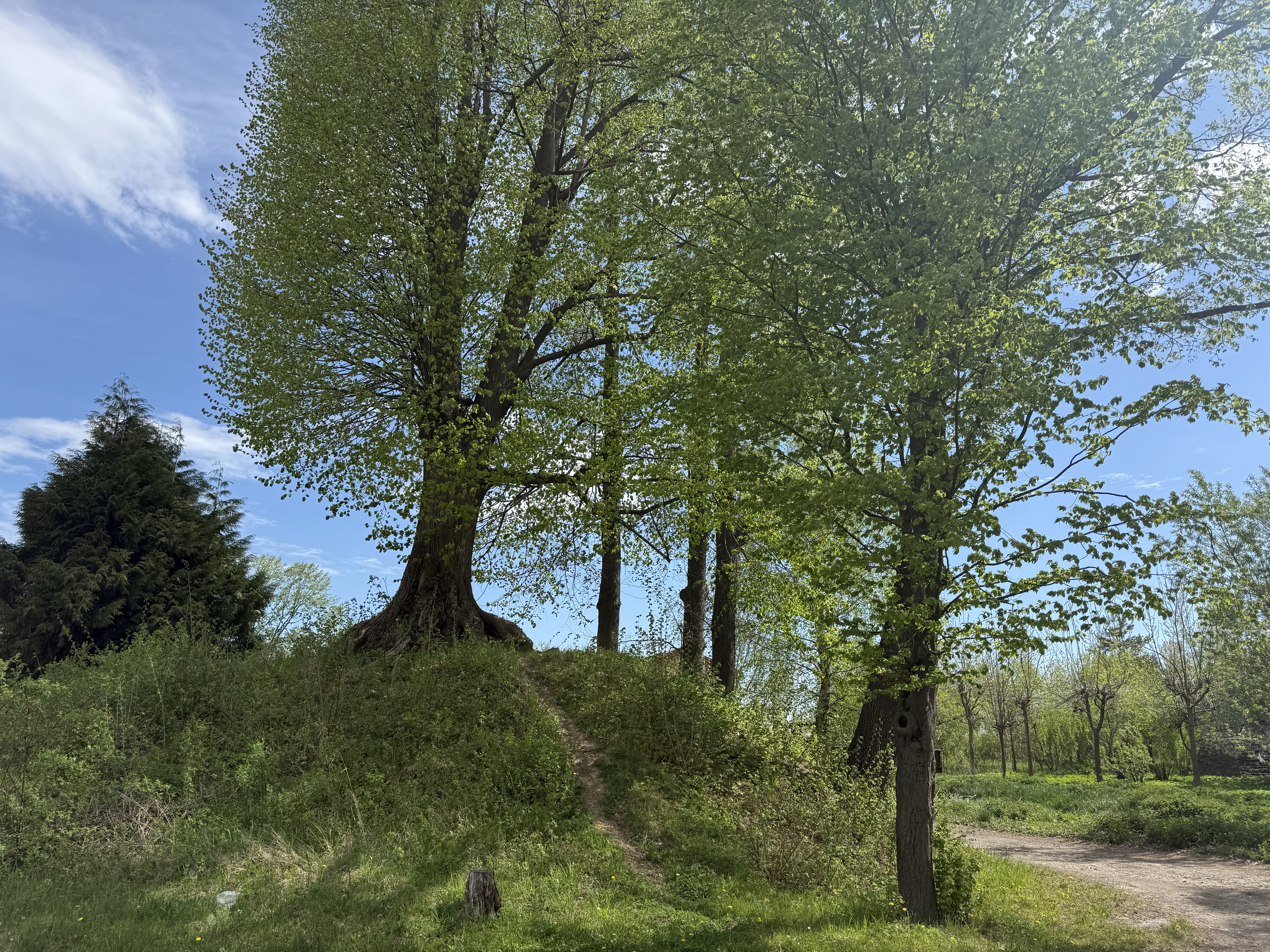

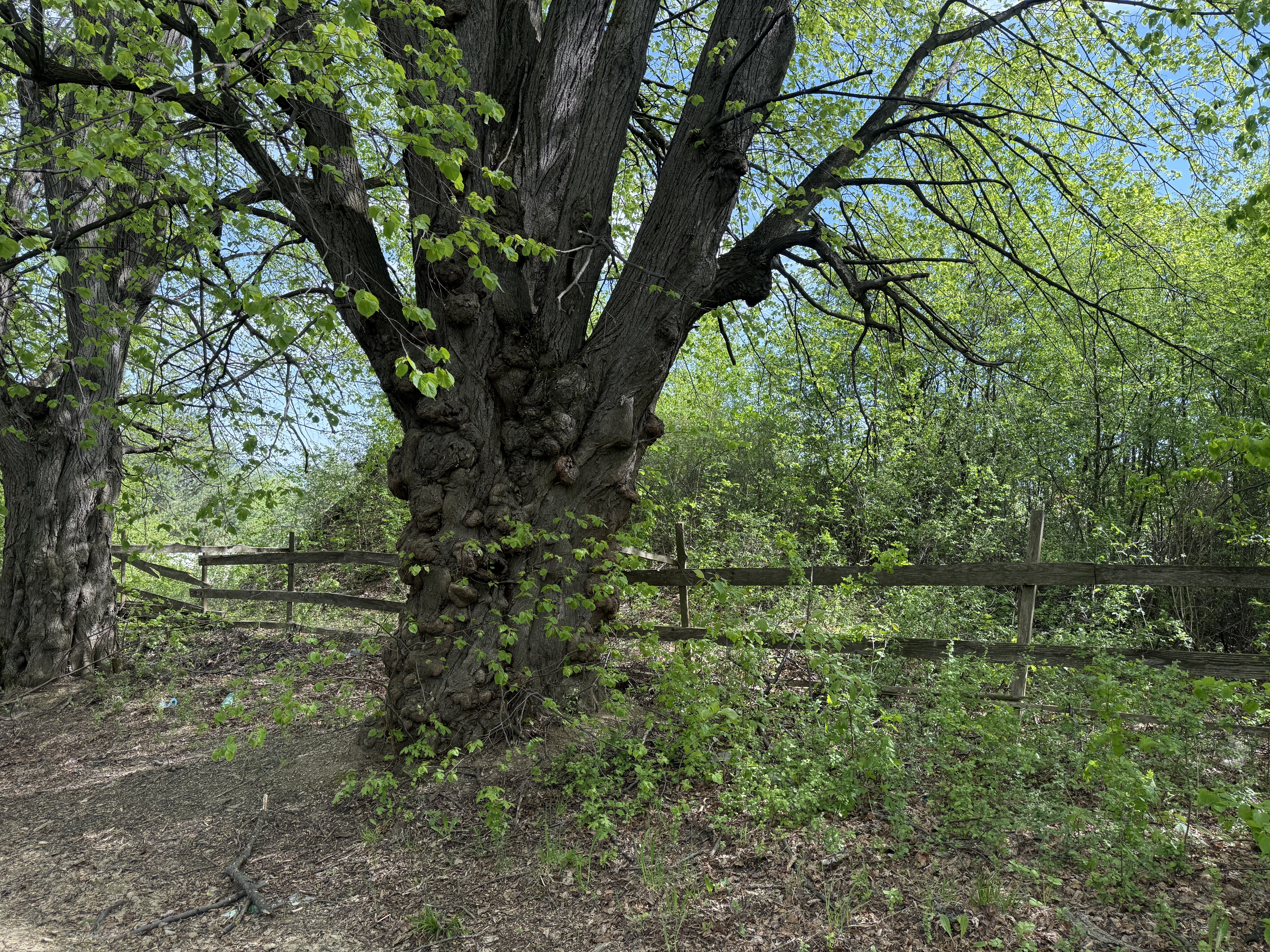
