= Khyriv urban hromada =

Hromada in Lviv Oblast, Ukraine

Khyriv urban hromada Хирівська міська громада
- Hromada
- Seal
- Interactive map of Khyriv urban hromada
- Country: Ukraine
- Oblast: Lviv Oblast
- Raion: Sambir Raion
- Admin. center: Khyriv

Area
  - Total: 218 km^{2} (84 sq mi)

Population (2021)
  - Total: 15,231
  - Density: 69.9/km^{2} (181/sq mi)
- CATOTTG code: UA46080210000051983
- Settlements: 25
- Cities: 1
- Villages: 24
- Website: hyrivska-gromada.gov.ua

Khyriv urban hromada (Ukrainian: Хирівська міська громада) is a hromada in Ukraine, in Sambir Raion of Lviv Oblast. The administrative center is the city of Khyriv.

== Settlements ==
The hromada consists of 1 city (Khyriv) and 24 villages:

- Bereziv
- Bunkovychi
- Velyka Sushytsia
- Hlyboka
- Horodovychi
- Humanets
- Zarichchia
- Zasadky
- Ivaniv
- Katyna
- Libukhova
- Lopushnytsia
- Murovane
- Pavlivka
- Poliana
- Rainova
- Skelivka
- Slyvnytsia
- Slokhyni
- Stariava
- Tarnavka
- Terlo
- Chapli
- Shumyna
