= Jesuit College in Khyriv =

Former Roman Catholic school in Khryiv, Ukraine

- Zakład Naukowo-Wychowawczy Ojców Jezuitów w Chyrowie
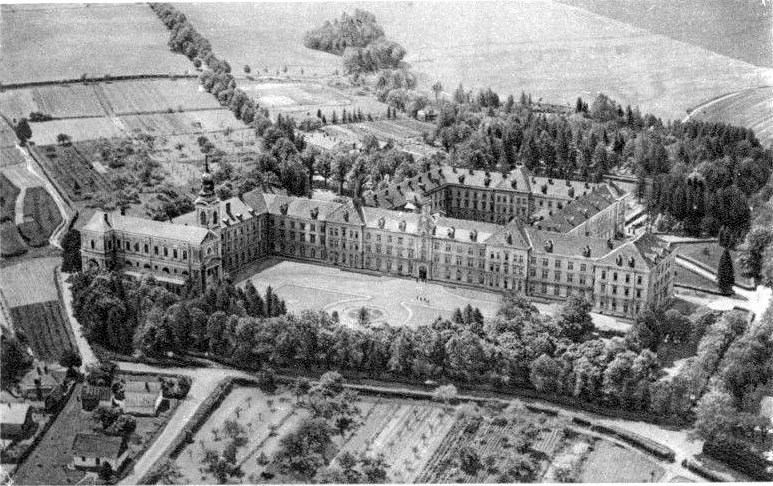
- Aerial view of the college buildings, 1930s
- Other name: Комплекс споруд Хирівської єзуїтської колегії
- Type: Roman Catholic boarding school for boys
- Active: 1580; 446 years ago, re-founded 1886–1939
- Founders: Marian Ignacy Dzierżykraj-Morawski SJ, Henryk Jackowski SJ
- Religious affiliation: Roman Catholic (Jesuit)
- Location: Khyriv, Ukraine nr. Przemyśl, Poland, Chyrów, Galicia (Eastern Europe) in Austria-Hungary, Poland now Ukraine
- Patron saint: Saint Joseph

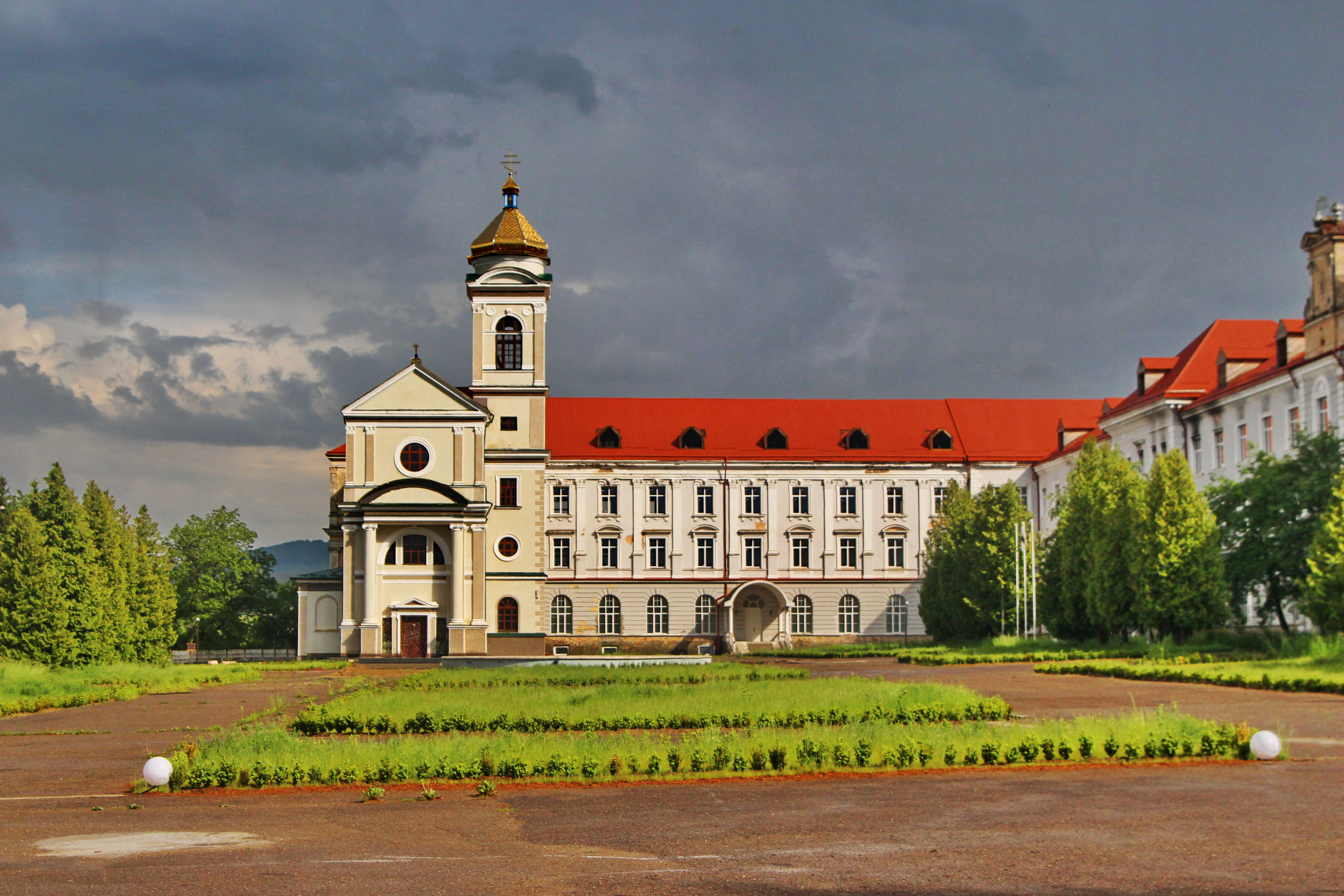
Part of the former school buildings after reconstruction following the 2018 fire

Jesuit College in Khyriv, formerly Jesuit College in Chyrów (full name: The Educational Academy of the Jesuit Fathers in Chyrów, Polish: Zakład Naukowo-Wychowawczy Ojców Jezuitów w Chyrowie, Ukrainian: Комплекс споруд Хирівської єзуїтської колегії), was a purpose-built Polish secondary boys college, owned by the Society of Jesus, in the occupied Austro-Hungarian partition of Poland in the late 19th century. The vast estate, comprising the college, has the rare distinction of having existed in at least five separate national Jurisdictions in the last century and a half. From 1918 the college was in independent Poland until 1939 when it ceased to exist as an institution, although not as an asset, due to foreign invasions, first by the Red Army till 1941, then by the German Wehrmacht until 1943, before being re-taken by the Soviet Union. Since 1944 the site and its entire estate was in the USSR and since 1991 has been in present-day Ukraine.

The college in Khyriv and its extensive grounds have so far not been returned to the Jesuit order, as part of war reparations. For a time it served as army barracks for the Soviet Armed Forces. In August 2013, the historic college and outbuildings were sold in a Ukrainian government auction for ₴2,231,000 (then about $275,000) to a private investor "Khyriv-rent-invest”.

As a (gimnazjum), the college had a Jesuit educational tradition reaching back to 1580 in the Commonwealth of Two Nations. It opened in Chyrów (now Khyriv, Ukraine), near Przemyśl then in the Austrian Partition of the former Polish–Lithuanian Commonwealth, just as the Jesuit college in Tarnopol was closed down by the authorities in 1886. It survived and flourished despite obstacles from the Austrian authorities, and was to continue the tradition of the former Jesuit Colleges in Polotsk (1580-1820) and Tarnopol until the Soviet invasion of Poland (1939). It was considered one of the most prestigious boys' schools in Poland and many of its alumni went on to notable careers.

== History ==
The foundation of the school was initiated by two Jesuit priests: academic theologian, Father Marian Ignacy Dzierżykraj-Morawski (1845–1901), alumnus of the dissolved Jesuit Collège Saint Clément in Metz, France and Henryk Jackowski (1834–1905), Polish provincial of the Jesuits. In 1883 the Polish Jesuits purchased the country estate of Franciszek Topolnicki at Bąkowice near Chyrów, about 33 kilometres (21 mi) from Przemyśl. The school, opened in 1886. It drew on the traditions of the erstwhile Jesuit College in Polotsk which closed in 1820, and the Jesuit College in Tarnopol, closed in 1886.

In the autumn of 1918 the college served as the quarters for the company of general Stanisław Maczek which he wrote about in his memoire.

After Poland regained its independence and the Second Polish Republic came into being, a statute of the Ministry for Religious Faiths and Public Education, which came into force on 5 December 1925, confirmed that the college operated with the full rights of all state secondary educational establishments. During the 1920s the college was known as the "Convent of St Joseph in Chyrów". Since that time, the college was generally referred to as "Chyrów" and its pupils as "Chyrowiacy" (Chyrowiaks). Ownership of the college remained with the Polish province of the Jesuit order. The teaching at the college followed a classical curriculum. In 1926 there were eight forms and fourteen departments, with 471 male pupils.

== College facilities ==
The college was rated as one of the best in Poland if not in the whole of Europe. The vast buildings comprised airy classes, with the latest teaching aids, ateliers devoted to particular subjects, a library with in excess of 30,000 volumes, comprising collections on geography, history (including archaeology and numismatics). There was a natural science department with its own botanical garden. As in Stonyhurst College, Chyrów's equivalent Jesuit school in Lancashire, there was an astronomical observatory. The sports facilities included gyms with a range of equipment, four tennis courts and eight pitches.

The college boasted its own theatre. There was generous space for socialising and boarders had good sleeping accommodation with an enormous dining hall and an assembly chamber. The estate possessed a modern plumbing and waste water system, with an independent electricity generator, an infirmary, a mill with a bakery attached. There was a steam laundry, and engineering workshops for repairs. The estate had its own farm, all in a rural setting with a landscaped park. The original building design was by Antoni Łuszczkiewicz, and later by Jan Zakrzewski. Further extensions were added at the start of the 20th century supervised by Edgar Kovats. The ensemble consisted of a total of 327 rooms and lecture halls to accommodate 400 pupils.

=== The library ===
As committed scholars, the Jesuits, devoted great effort and attention to the development of the academy's library. The nucleus of the collection was formed out of the collection moved from their college in Tarnopol. It was further expanded with the volumes the Jesuits managed to recover from many locations after the re-establishment of the Order in Europe, and by new purchases and donations. The collection included medieval manuscripts, incunabula, old music prints, collections of the 18th-century maps, rare scholarly and scientific works, academic and school manuals from Jesuit colleges (the oldest from the Jesuit College in Polotsk), from missions (e.g. Minsk) and from Jesuit houses before the suppression of the Society of Jesus.

The Chyrów library collection surpassed, by the number of volumes, their value and educational quality, all secondary school libraries in the Austrian Partition of Poland and then those of all educational establishments in the Second Polish Republic, after Poland had regained national independence in 1920. At the time of the Soviet invasion of Poland (1939) the Chyrów Library counted over 50,000 volumes and items of cultural heritage. In 1939 the academy was liquidated by the Soviet authorities and its library with its collections entirely destroyed.

=== Curriculum ===
Although the college curriculum was largely based on that followed in all Polish state high schools, there were at various stages, attempts to extend its scope. For instance in 1890 there was an experiment to teach history in the German language, however the expected results were not attained and the initiative was abandoned. Between 1909 and 1917 aside from core subjects taught in Polish, other language teaching was introduced consisting of Ukrainian, Russian, French and English. To those were added courses in Graphic design and Calligraphy. A music department was developed to teach various instruments and to put on performances. The availability of extra-curricular subjects made it possible for pupils from less privileged backgrounds to attend the college. However, they formed a minority of students.

=== Regimented System ===
The pupils timetable was regimented as was the behaviour expected of them. A former turn-of-the-century pupil recorded his college routines thus:

In that two-floor structure there were two kilometres of corridors. Each form had its own sleeping quarters, its own classroom and games room. Crossing all common parts and passages had to be done in silence in two columns. Entering the dining hall, set for 550 people, had to be in silence, and only after the prefect general, who dined with us, had sounded his bell, was talking permitted. At the end of the meal another bell signalled talking had to stop, which did not always work out harmoniously. A wake-up call was sounded at 6am and lights out was at 9.30pm. Lessons began at 9am till 1pm, with three quarters of an hour for recreation. Lessons resumed at 4pm till 5.30pm. Prep lasted four hours and was arranged over three phases. The first was between 8 and 9 in the morning. Recreation was allotted two and a half hours split over two parts. On Tuesdays and Thursdays instead of after-lunch recreation or lessons, we had outings and rambling. In winter there was ice-skating, skiing and sledding. In summer we could swim in the river.

== Alumni ==
During its years of operation, 6,000 alumni had passed through its doors. Some notable students included:

- Roman Abraham
- Witold Bełza
- Aleksander Birkenmajer
- Adam Epler
- Józef Garliński, army officer, survivor of Auschwitz concentration camp, writer
- Kamil Giżycki
- Adolf Hyła
- Kazimierz Junosza-Stępowski
- Jerzy Kirchmayer
- Kazimierz Konopka
- Adam Kozłowiecki
- Eugeniusz Kwiatkowski, Deputy Prime Minister of the Second Polish Republic
- Włodzimierz Jung-Mochnacki, bank director before WWII, prisoner of Woldenberg POW camp until 1945
- Antoni Halka-Ledóchowski,
- Juliusz Mieroszewski
- Edward O'Rourke
- Zdzisław Peszkowski
- Ksawery Pruszyński
- Stanisław Kostka Starowieyski
- Kazimierz Tomczak
- Kazimierz Wierzyński
- Antoni Wiwulski

== Faculty ==
The school's faculty included:

- The future blessed Father Jan Beyzym, SJ (1850–1912) who taught in Tarnopol and Chyrów for 17 years before leaving, at 48 in 1898, for Madagascar to begin his apostolate to people suffering with Leprosy.
- Adam Kozłowiecki, SJ was in charge of discipline 1933–34. After surviving Dachau concentration camp, he went on to spend decades as a missionary in Zambia. He became Archbishop of Lusaka and was elevated in 1998 to Cardinal priest by Pope John Paul II.
- Władyslaw Dzikiewicz, last Head Master until 1939. During the war was parish priest of the John the Baptist Cathedral in the Old Town in Warsaw

== World War II and after ==
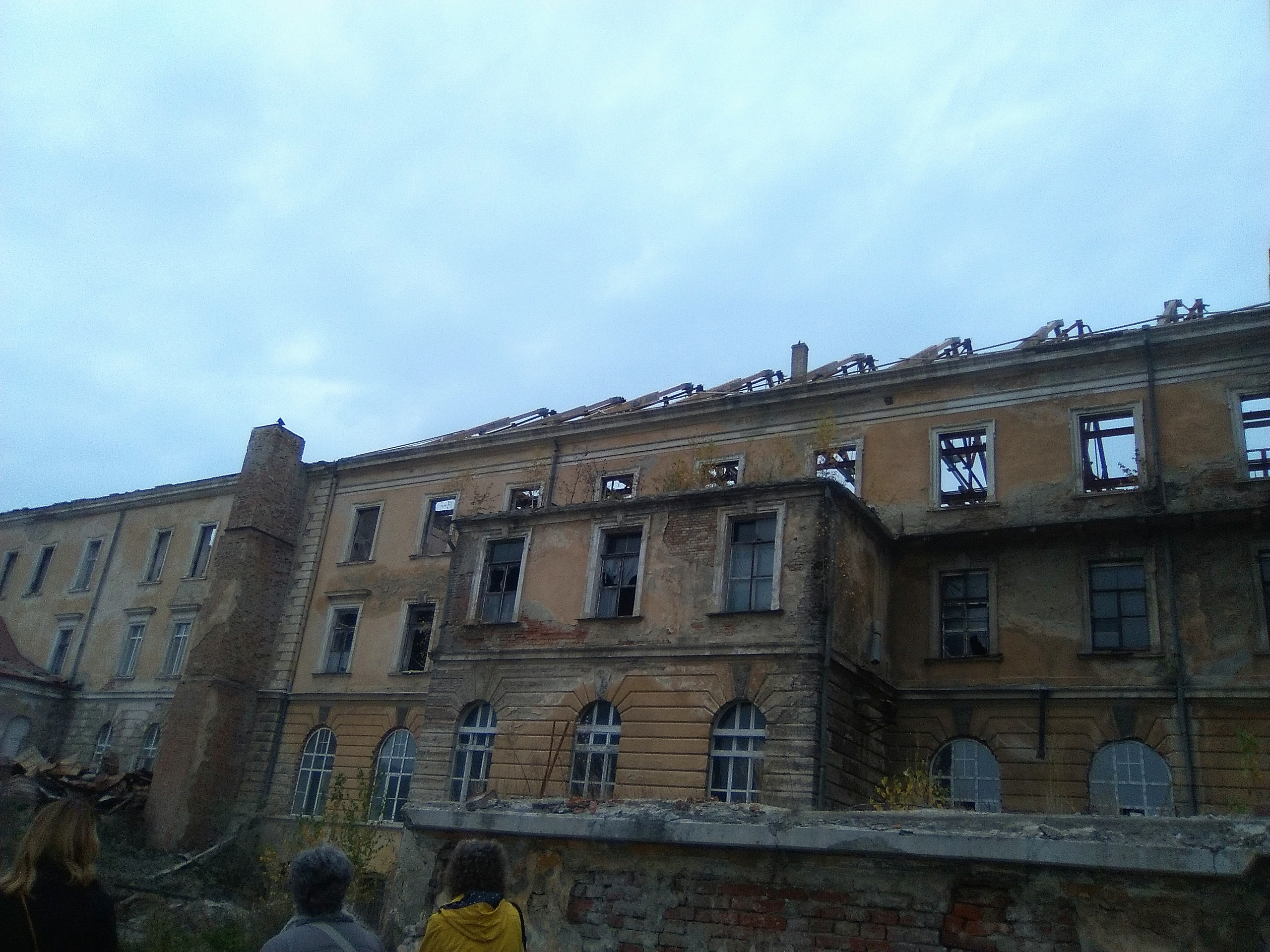
The fire damaged Jesuit College in Khyriv, Ukraine (detail, 2018)

Modern view of the former college building after reconstruction

During the first phase of Soviet occupation in September 1939 which lasted until June 1941, the site became a military base for the Red Army. Upon the subsequent ingress on the territory of the German Wehrmacht in June 1941, the college was used as a prisoner of war camp. From the second half of 1943 till the end of the German occupation in August 1944, it was used as a military hospital.

Following the Fourth Partition of Poland after the war, the college, known familiarly as "Chyrów", found itself beyond the Polish frontier. It was now in the Ukrainian Soviet Socialist Republic, when it served as a Soviet military barracks until 1992, and housed Ukrainian troops until 2004. On 4 February 1996, the college chapel was re-consecrated as a Greek Catholic church dedicated to Saint Nicholas. The original buildings and later military extensions were allowed to become run down.

There were discussions to use the site for a Polish-Ukrainian research institute, and while the local authority had in principle agreed to such an initiative, it changed its mind and leased the site to a private developer. The idea was to create a country club or a theme park.

On 24 March 2018 the attics of the former college caught alight with considerable damage to the fabric of the buildings.

Most of the damaged parts were restored shortly after the 2018 fire. As of 2026 the territory of the former college functions as part of a large recreational and sports complex.

== Commemoration ==
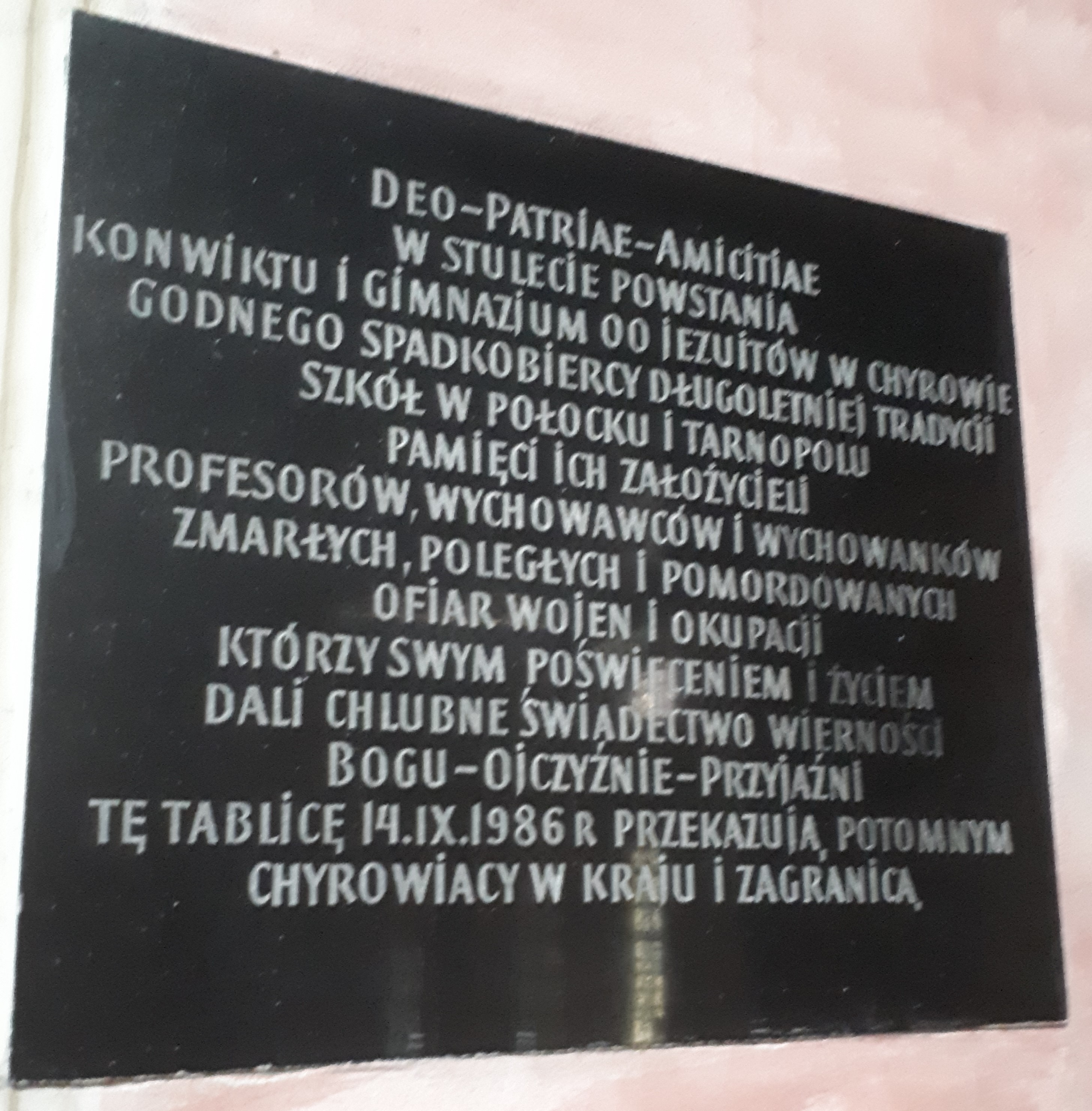
Plaque commemorating the foundation of the Jesuit Monastery and College in Chyrów - St. Barbara's Church, Krakow Poland

On the 100th anniversary of the college's foundation, a commemorative plaque was installed in the church of St. Barbara in Kraków, Poland on 14 September 1986. It was sponsored by "Chyrowiak" Old Boys, both in Poland and abroad to recall the long traditions and legacy of the earlier Jesuit colleges of Polotsk and of Tarnopol of which Chyrow became an honourable successor. The plaque also pays tribute to the founders of the college, its teachers, prefects and pupils and all those among them who paid the ultimate sacrifice during its existence, dying or being murdered in the ensuing historical conflicts, including the two world wars. The motto on the plaque reads: Deo - Patriae - Amicitiae.

== See also ==
- List of Jesuit sites
- Jazłowiec College
- Territorial evolution of Poland
- Grunwald alley
