= Khyriv railway station =

Railway station in Khyriv, Ukraine

Khyriv Хирів
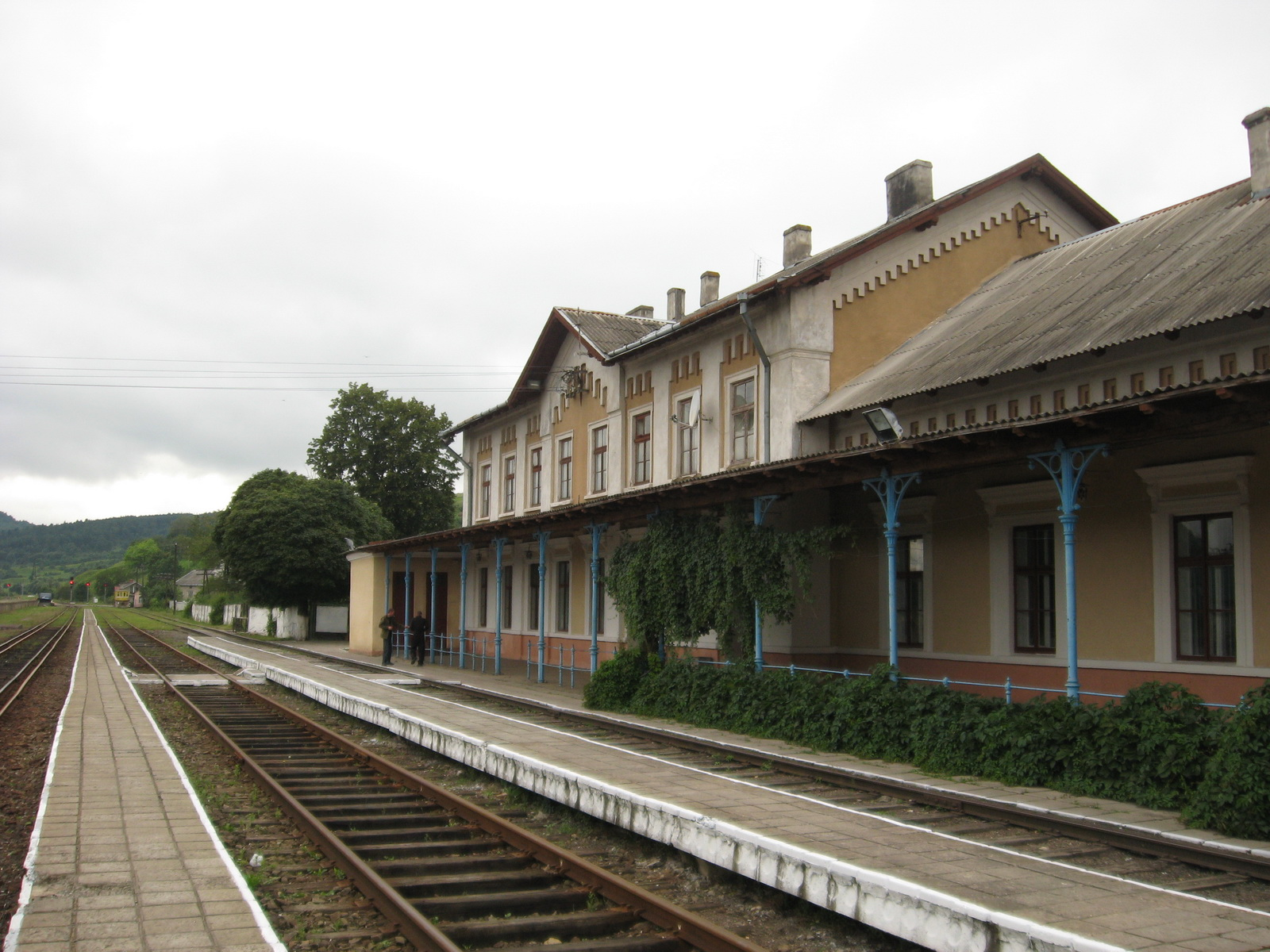
- Khyriv train station in 2010

General information
- Location: Khyriv, Lviv Oblast; Ukraine
- Coordinates: 49.531657°N 22.850832°E
- Owner: Ukrzaliznytsia
- Operator: Lviv Railways

History
- Opened: 1870
Location

Khyriv railway station (Ukrainian: Хирів) is a railway junction and border station located in Khyriv, Ukraine. It is one of the oldest and most historically significant stations in Lviv Oblast.

== History ==
Khyriv railway station was built in 1870 during the construction of the first Hungarian-Galician and Dniester Railways, and became one of the most important railway junctions in Austria-Hungary up until the end of World War II. In addition to the main line, several smaller ones were built as part of the Dniester railway connecting Khyriv-Sambir-Drohobych-Stryi. The station was damaged during the First and Second World Wars but it survived and was repaired.

The station was famously featured in The Good Soldier Švejk where he was accidentally arrested by Hungarian guards and forced to perform manual labor repairing the war-damaged railway line.

Today, the station building is preserved in satisfactory condition and is a landmark of the city of Khyriv.

In 2023 Ukrzaliznytsia repaired the building of the train station and rebuilt 70 km of tracks around Khyriv and right up to the polish border as part of a project to develop railway connections between Ukraine and the European Union.

In 2024 rail services through Khyriv station within Ukraine were reinstated on an experimental basis, with further plans to launch an international train service.
