= Forest Ridge School of the Sacred Heart =

Private, girls school in Bellevue, Washington, US

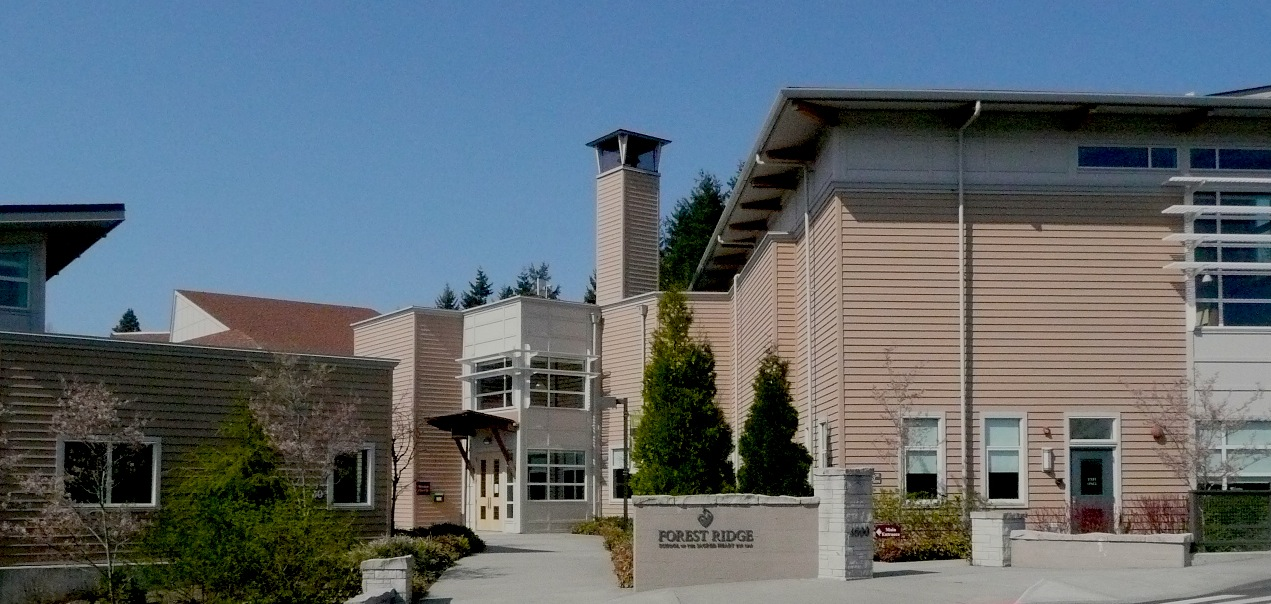

Location
- 4800 139th Avenue SE; Bellevue, (King County), Washington 98006; United States; 47°33′32″N 122°9′19″W

Information
- Type: Private, All-girls
- Religious affiliation: Catholic
- Established: 1907
- Head of school: Mary Rose Guerin
- Grades: 5–12
- Colors: Green, navy and white
- Song: Coeur de Jesus
- Athletics conference: Emerald City
- Mascot: Raven
- Accreditation: Northwest Accreditation Commission
- Tuition: Day school $44,795 (2024-2025); boarding school $72,400
- Affiliation: Network of Sacred Heart Schools
- Website: http://www.forestridge.org

Forest Ridge School of the Sacred Heart is a private, Roman Catholic, all-girls middle school and high school in Bellevue, Washington, United States, with a student population of around 260. The school is a member of the Society of the Sacred Heart schools and is part of the global Network of Sacred Heart Schools. Forest Ridge educates girls in grades 5 through 12.

== History ==
Forest Ridge was established in Seattle in 1907 as the Convent of the Sacred Heart- Forest Ridge by the Religious of the Sacred Heart. The informal name was Forest Ridge Convent or FRC. The school relocated to Somerset Hill in Bellevue in 1971, and the Seattle building was sold to the Seattle Hebrew Academy, which is still located there.

In 2006, Forest Ridge made major additions and renovations to its campus, notably the main high school building, the main offices and chapel housed in the Sacred Heart Center, and the science labs.

== Academics ==
Forest Ridge offers challenging academics focusing on real world problem solving. The Forest Ridge Upper School does not have AP classes, but select classes offer college credit through UW in the High School Dual Enrollment Partnership.

The Forest Ridge Upper School operates on a Mod-Schedule.

== Athletics ==
Forest Ridge offers a no-cut policy. Students can choose from a variety of sports such as soccer, cross country, basketball, volleyball, ultimate, softball, track, tennis and golf.
