= Herburt coat of arms =

Polish coat of arms

Herburt
- Battle cry: Herburt
- Alternative names: Pawcz, Fullstein, Herbort, Herbortowa, Voronich
- Earliest mention: Westphalia, Moravia, Poland (1353)
- Towns: Bohušov (Cz), Felsztyn(PL -1939)
- Families: Arłamowski, Chełmowski, Dobromilski, Falsztyn, Fulstein, Fulsztyn, Fulsztyński, Gerberski, Hajbowicz, Helman, Herberski, Herbortowski, Herburt, Hewel, Hewell, Heybowicz, Katyna, Kobyliński, Kozika, Kozieka, Kozieł, Koziełł, Lewgowd, Milatowskic, Mierzewski, Modzelewski, Modzelowski, Nicz, Nosicki, Nowicki, Odnowski, Ponyrko, Powęzowski, Rymgayło, Rymgayłowicz, Wismułowicz, Wisnarzewski, Woronicz, Zyniew

Herburt is a Polish coat of arms. It was used by several distinct and unrelated szlachta families such as the Pawcz family of Ruthenian Galicia. A coat of arms is an individual or family heirloom the origins of which lie in the 12th century.

== Blazon ==
Variation

== Notable bearers ==
Notable bearers of this coat of arms include:

- Jan Herburt (Arłamowski)
- Fryderyk Herburt
- Jan Paweł Woronicz
- Jan Szczęsny Herburt
- Mikołaj Herburt
- Mikołaj Herburt Odnowski
- Piotr Herburt
- Stanisław Herburt
- Szymon Konarski ps. Janusz Hejbowicz

== Gallery ==
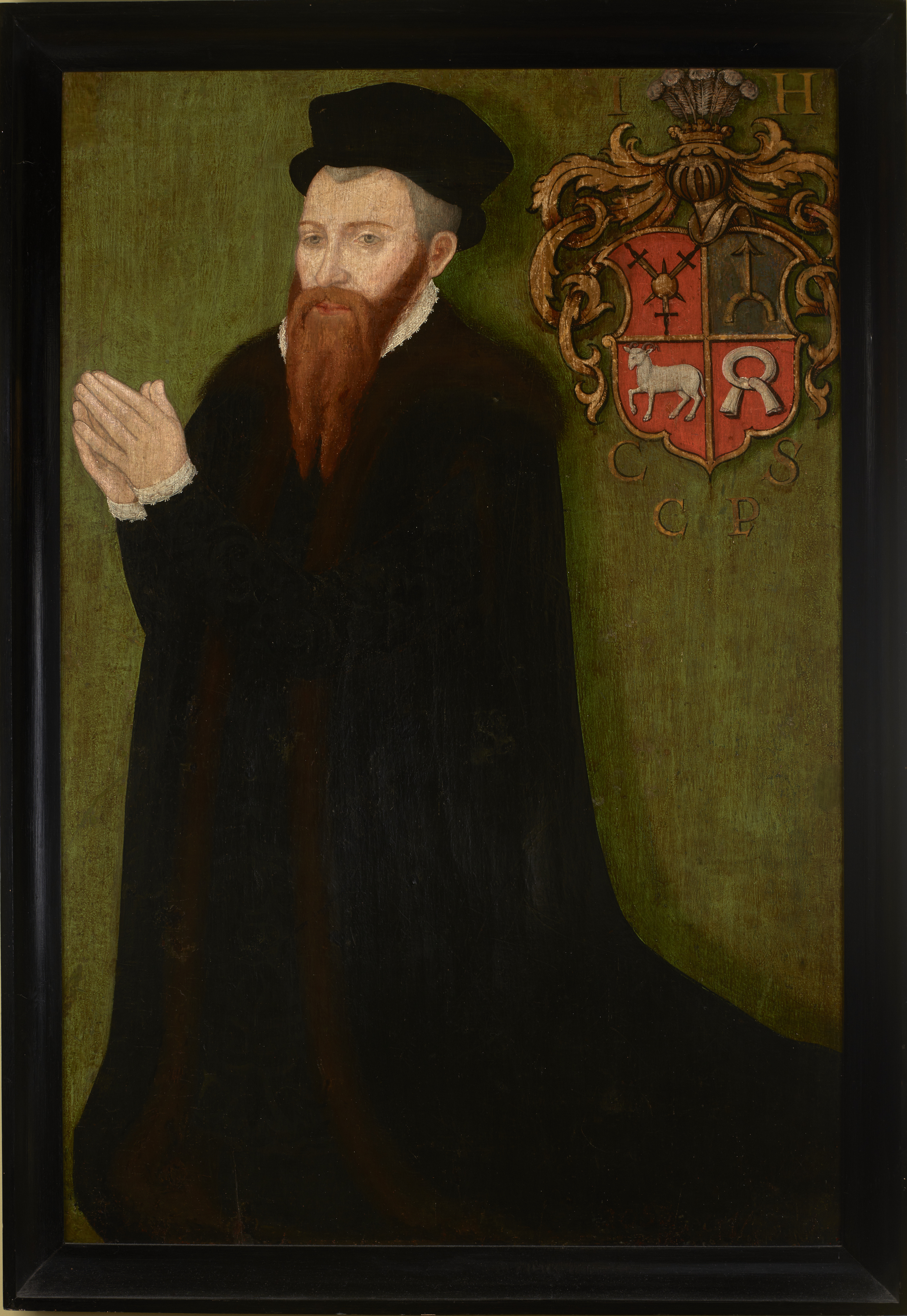
Portrait of Jan Herburt, Polish humanist, castellan of Sanok and elder of Przemyśl, (1524–1578)

Coat of arms of Felsztyn, 16th century

Coat of arms of Dobromil, 17th century

Coat of arms of Felsztyn, 16th century

Coat of arms of Bohušov

== See also ==
- Polish heraldry
- Heraldic clan
- List of Polish nobility coats of arms

== Bibliography ==
- Tadeusz Gajl: Herbarz polski od średniowiecza do XX wieku : ponad 4500 herbów szlacheckich 37 tysięcy nazwisk 55 tysięcy rodów. L&L, 2007. ISBN 978-83-60597-10-1.
