= Seattle Hebrew Academy =

Private school in Seattle, Washington, USA

Coordinates: 47°38′04″N 122°18′29″W

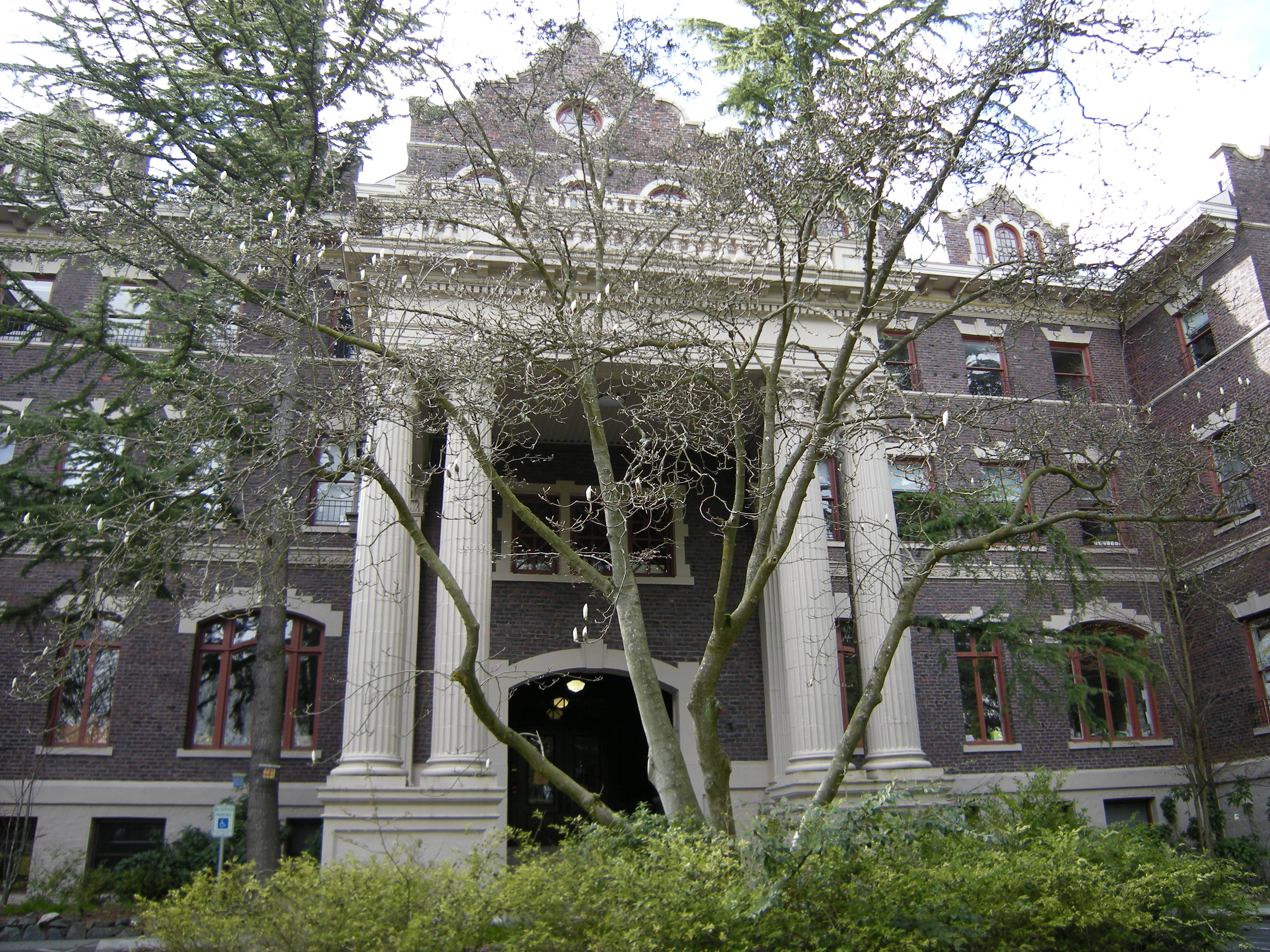
Seattle Hebrew Academy

The Seattle Hebrew Academy is a private Kindergarten–grade 8 school and Preschool located in the Capitol Hill neighborhood of Seattle.

== History ==
The school was established in 1947 as the "Seattle Hebrew Day School" to integrate Jewish and secular studies following World War II, and in the following year, it and the Seattle Talmud Torah consolidated. The school changed its name in 1969 to "Seattle Hebrew Academy", to reflect the addition of a childhood center. The school is located in a space formerly occupied by the Sisters of the Sacred Heart and the old Forest Ridge, since 1973 when the building was purchased by the school administration.

The academy building took extensive damage and was deemed unsafe following the Nisqually Quake in March, 2001. The school had temporary campuses during the retrofit and rebuild period. They were first housed in Mercer Island's Herzl Ner Tamid for the remainder of the 2001 school year. The Seattle Hebrew Academy built temporary classrooms in the parking lot of Bikur Cholim Machzikay Hadath for the lower school while the middle school was housed in portables in the upper field on the Seattle Hebrew Academy's campus. The school board raised money for renovations, totalling $8 million over the course of three years. The academy reopened on their Capitol Hill campus in Autumn 2004.

In 2006, the academy hired Rivy Poupko Kletenik as their head of school. She was the first woman head of school in the school's history. Two weeks after Kletenik was elected to serve as head of school, a break away school formed in reaction to the Seattle Hebrew Academy selecting a female head. Kletenik served the Academy for 16 years, tied for the longest serving Head of School with the first head, Rabbi Samuel Gruadenz. In 2022, Rabbi Benjy Owen became the first Sephardic head of school. In 2023, the school officially adopted the "Stars of David" as its new mascot, commonly referred to as the "Stars." The school colors are dark blue, athletic gold, and white.

The school is accredited through Northwest Association for Independent Schools, NWAIS.
