= Dovid Shlomo Novoseller =

American rabbi

Rabbi Dovid Shlomo Novoseller

Dovid Shlomo Novoseller, a descendant of Rabbis Levi Yitzchok of Berditchev (Kedushat Levi), Samuel Eidels (Maharsha) and Yechezkel Landau and of the Meor Einayim of Chernobyl, Rabbi Menachem Nahum Twersky, was born in Yarmolintsky on Aug. 19, 1877, and received semicha from Rabbi Moshe Noson HaLevi Rubinstein, Av Beth Din of Vinnitsa.

Novoseller acted as Av Beth Din of Felshtin from 1917 to 1928. During the horrific February 1919 pogrom, Novoseller's wife and two daughters were murdered and he was left for dead. After a miraculous recovery he remarried and in 1928 emigrated to Philadelphia where he became Av Beth Din and founded Cong. Bnai Yehoshua and a free hostel for the Jewish homeless. He also served as president of the Vaad HaRabonim of Philadelphia and vice president of the Union of Orthodox Rabbis.

Novoseller died in 1966.
