= Eliezer Poupko =

American-Lithuanian rabbi (1886–1961)

Rabbi Eliezer Poupko
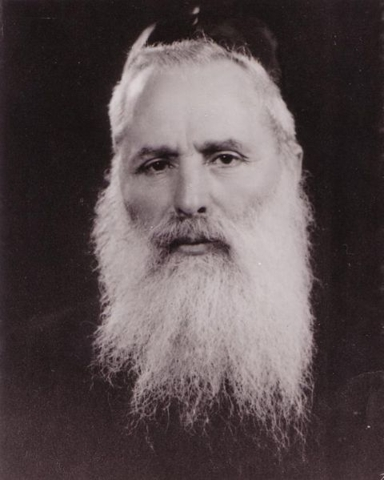
- Rabbi Eliezer Poupko

Chief Rabbi of Velizh

Rabbi of Haverhill, Massachusetts

Rabbi of Providence, Rhode Island

Rabbi of Aitz Chaim Congregation in Philadelphia

Personal life
- Born: March 18, 1886 Radin, Lithuania
- Died: September 23, 1961 (aged 75) Albert Einstein Medical Center, Philadelphia
- Spouse: Pesha Chaya
- Children: Reuven Poupko, Baruch Poupko, others
- Known for: Chief rabbi in Velizh, Russia; Rabbi in Philadelphia
- Occupation: Rabbi

Religious life
- Religion: Judaism
- Denomination: Orthodox

Rabbi Eliezer Poupko (or Pupko) (1886–1961) was born in Radin, Lithuania, on March 18, 1886. He attended the Telz yeshiva. Receiving Semicha in 1908, he served for twenty four years as chief rabbi of the Jewish community in Velizh, Russia. Rabbi Poupko was twice tried in 1930s for defying the religious policies of the Soviet Union and was sentenced to two years in a Siberian prison. He served only part of that sentence as the United States rabbinate was able to win a commutation.

Rabbi Poupko immigrated to the US in 1931, first serving congregations in Haverhill, Massachusetts and Providence, Rhode Island. In 1942, he became the Rabbi of the Aitz Chaim Congregation in Philadelphia. He was an honorary president and a member of the executive board of the Union of Orthodox Rabbis of the United States and Canada.

Rabbi Poupko married Pesha Chaya, a daughter of Rabbi Yaakov Moshe Sapir, rabbi of Kenna near Vilna and subsequently of Saratov. Their four oldest sons were sent to study in the Israel Meir Kagan's (Chofetz Chaim) yeshiva in Radin, and indeed many of Rabbi Poupko's children went on to play a pivotal role within the Jewish world. Rabbi Reuven Poupko published a Sefer by the name of Toras Reuven in Philadelphia in 1940, containing a warm approbation by Rabbi Isser Zalman Meltzer that praises the author's father. Rabbi Baruch Poupko became a leading American Rabbi and author of numerous articles, books and anthologies. One of Rabbi Poupko's sons-in-law was the renowned Rabbi Mordechai Savitzky, Chief Rabbi of Boston and author of twenty-two works on the Talmud. Another was Rabbi Gedalia Dov Schwartz.

== Death ==
Rabbi Poupko died at the Albert Einstein Medical Center in Philadelphia on September 23, 1961. At the time of his death, he was the most distinguished rabbi in Pennsylvania. His wife Pesha Chaya outlived him, dying at the age of 87 in 1976.
