= Strwiąż =

Strwiąż Стривігор
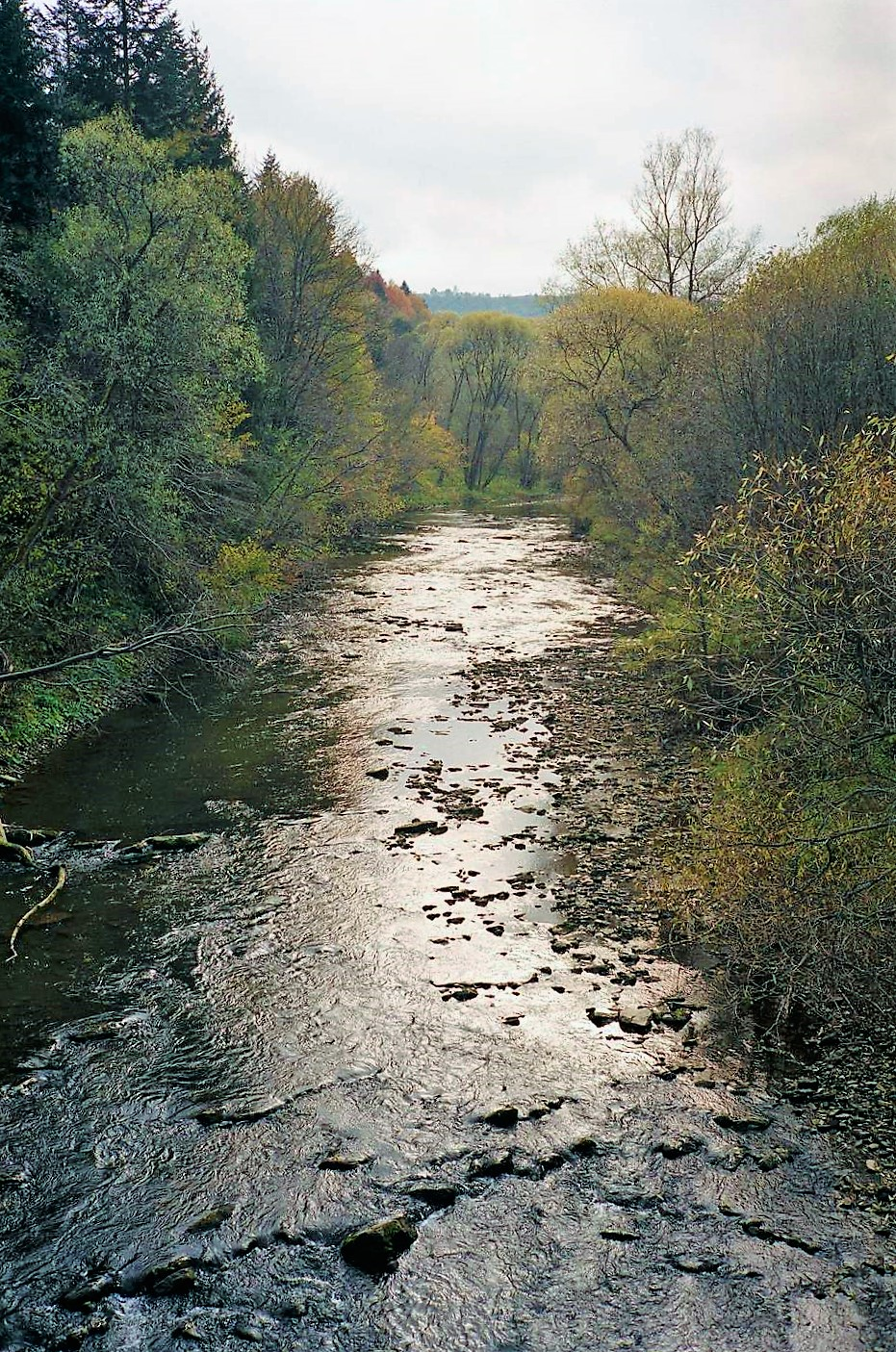

Location
- Country: Poland, Ukraine

Physical characteristics
- Source
  - coordinates: 49°28′25″N 22°39′52″E
- Mouth
  - location: Dniester
  - coordinates: 49°35′33″N 23°27′49″E

Basin features
- Progression: Dniester→ Dniester Estuary→ Black Sea
- Cities: Ustrzyki Dolne, Khyriv

Strwiąż (Polish pronunciation: [str̥fʲjɔ̃w̃ʃ]), also known as Stryvihor or Strviazh (Ukrainian: Стривігор, Стрв'яж), is a river in Poland and Ukraine, a tributary of the Dniester. Its source is near the town of Ustrzyki Dolne, southeastern Poland. It crosses the Ukrainian border, flows through the town of Khyriv and joins the Dniester south of the town Rudky.

== Description ==
Length is 94 kilometres (58 mi), basin area is 926 square kilometres (358 sq mi).The predominant width of the riverbed is 10–20 metres (33–66 ft)

The river begins on the outskirts of the city Ustrzyki Dolne and then flows near the center of Khyriv dividing it into two parts running along the central area.

== Interesting facts ==
Once, there were many water mills on the Strwiąż river. About seven mills operated on a mill channel that started in Khyriv and was about 30 kilometres (19 mi) long.
