= Baruch Poupko =

Baruch Aaron Poupko
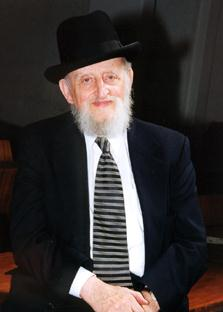
- Poupko in 2005
- Title: Rabbi, Scholar, Author, and Lecturer

Personal life
- Born: February 5, 1917 Velizh, Russia
- Died: April 14, 2010 (aged 93) Seattle, WA
- Children: Rivy Poupko Kletenik
- Parent(s): Rabbi Eliezer and Pesha Poupko
- Education: Rabbi Isaac Elchanan Theological Seminary, University of Pittsburgh

Religious life
- Religion: Judaism
- Order: Rabbi
- Ordination: 1941

Baruch Aaron "Bernard" Poupko (February 5, 1917 – April 14, 2010) was a Russian-born American scholar, author, and lecturer. A refugee who escaped persecution in his native Russia, he went on to become a prominent figure in the Jewish community in the United States whose career largely focused on advocating for Soviet Jews.

== Early life and escape from Russia ==
Baruch Poupko was born in Velizh, Russia, in 1917, to Rabbi Eliezer and Pesha Poupko. Eliezer Poupko was the chief Rabbi in their community, and also an activist who sent letters describing the local conditions for Jews to Rabbinic leaders in the United States and England. The Soviet authorities intercepted the letters, and the elder Poupko was arrested and then convicted following a trial in 1930.

Although he was sentenced to two years of hard labour in Siberia, his sentence was reduced to house arrest with the help of the Joint Distribution Committee (JDC). The family then managed to escape to Latvia. The JDC also secured passports for the family, and they made their way to Poland, and eventually, in 1931, to the United States.

== Life in the United States ==
Poupko was ordained by Rabbi Joseph Soloveitchik at the Rabbi Isaac Elchanan Theological Seminary at Yeshiva University in 1941.

He moved to Pittsburgh in 1942, serving as Rabbi and later Senior Rabbi of Shaare Torah in Pittsburgh from 1942 to 2004. From 1949 to 1999 he presided over the Rabbinical Council of Pittsburgh, and was one of the founding members of the Hillel Academy of Pittsburgh. He studied history at Columbia University and obtained his doctorate at the University of Pittsburgh in 1952.

He wrote the Yiddish book In the Shadow of the Kremlin, as well as many articles about Soviet Jewry. His doctoral thesis, completed at the University of Pittsburgh, "traces the history and status of Jewish religious adult education, analyzing the various emphases in curriculum of the three major religious ideologies."

Poupko edited and co-edited 38 sermon volumes of the Rabbinical Council of America, including the scholarly Anglo-Hebrew volume Eidenu in memory of the founder and first president of Yeshiva University (YU), Bernard Revel, the volumes in honor of rabbis Yitzhak HaLevi Herzog and Joseph Soloveitchik, of the centennial of YU, and of Norman Lamm's 20th anniversary as President of YU.

Poupko served as the National Vice President of the Rabbinical Council of America and as the National President of the Religious Zionists of America. He lived in Seattle with his daughter, Rivy Poupko Kletenik, and son-in-law, Moshe Kletenik. He is the grandfather of Chaim Poupko, senior rabbi of Congregation Ahavath Torah in Englewood, New Jersey.

He died on April 14, 2010, in Seattle.

== Film ==
In 1983, filmmaker Sheila Chamovitz produced a half-hour documentary about Poupko entitled Murray Avenue: A Community in Transition. The film follows Poupko as he retires from Shaare Torah, where he served as Rabbi from 1942 to 1996.

== Sources ==
- "Poupko, Bernard." Encyclopaedia Judaica. Jerusalem: Keter, 1972.
- Rosenstein, Neil. The Unbroken Chain. Lakewood, NJ: CIS, 1990. p. 294
- American Jewish Year Book
