= Moshe Kletenik =

American rabbi (born 1954)

Rabbi Moshe Kletenik
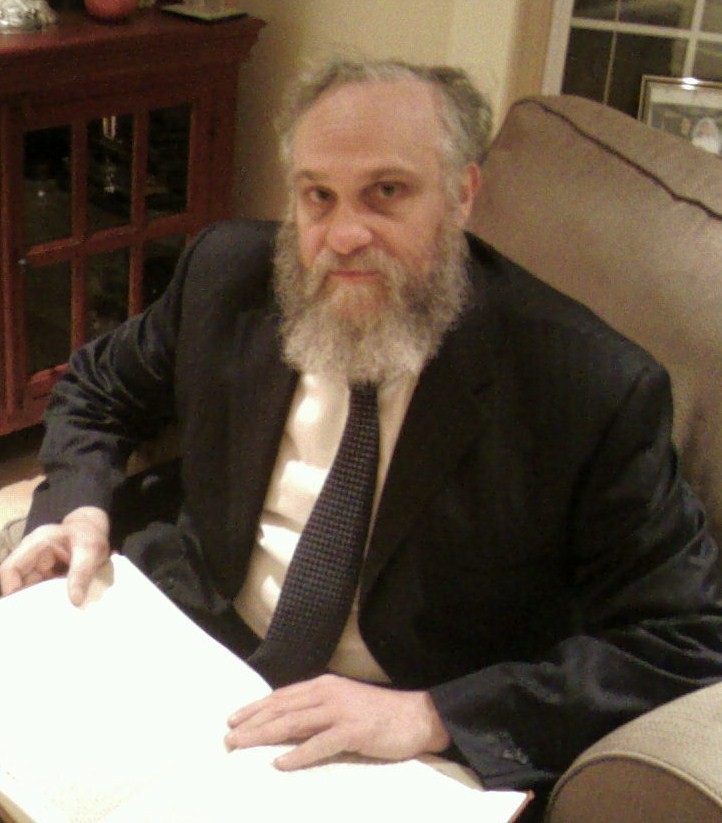
- Rabbi Moshe Kletenik

President, Rabbinical Council of America

Av Beth Din and Mesader Gittin, Vaad HaRabbanim of Greater Seattle

Personal details
- Born: 1954 (age 71–72) Chicago, Illinois
- Spouse: Rivy Poupko Kletenik
- Children: Gilah Kletenik

Moshe Kletenik is an American rabbi who was President of the Rabbinical Council of America.

== Biography ==
He was born in Chicago in 1954. His parents are Rabbi Shya and Rochelle Kletenik. After studying in the Hebrew Theological College and Yeshivas Brisk of Chicago, he received "Yoreh Yoreh" semicha from Rabbi Ahron Soloveichik . Kletenik received semicha in the areas of gittin and Even Ha'ezer and "Yadin Yadin" semicha from Rabbi Gedalia Dov Schwartz in 2004 and 2009 respectively.

He has served as a congregational rabbi, at Shaare Torah Congregation of Pittsburgh in Pittsburgh, Pennsylvania, and in Seattle at Bikur Cholim Machzikay Hadath Congregation from 1994 until June 2013. He is currently the Av Beth Din and Mesader Gittin for the Vaad HaRabbanim of Greater Seattle.

Kletenik was President of the Rabbinical Council of America and a member of the Faith Advisory Board to Governor Christine Gregoire of Washington State. He has written extensively on contemporary issues of Jewish law, especially Jewish medical ethics, and published in journals such as Hadarom, Hapardes and Aspaklaria and the RCA Sermon Anthology Series which he has co-edited. Kletenik lectures at medical ethics conferences such as Bar Ilan University.

Kletenik presently heads the Semicha Standards Committee of the RCA. This committee "determine[s] which institutional and private semichot are acceptable for membership in the RCA."

Kletenik brokered the conversion deal between the RCA and Israeli Chief Rabbinate. He defended this controversial deal in an editorial.

Under his leadership, the RCA approved a resolution at its April 2010 conference which prohibited the ordination of women as rabbis, as well as "the recognition of women as members of the Orthodox rabbinate, regardless of the title." The resolution was passed in response to the decision by the Hebrew Institute of Riverdale to ordain Sara Hurwitz with the newly established title 'Rabba', formally recognizing her role as a member of its rabbinical staff.

He is married to Rivy Poupko Kletenik and has four children, including Gilah Kletenik.

== Sources ==
- Rosenstein, Neil. The Unbroken Chain. Lakewood, NJ: CIS, 1990. p. 294
