= Rivy Poupko Kletenik =

American lecturer and educator

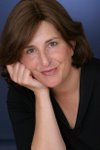

Rivy Poupko Kletenik is an American lecturer and educator.

== Career ==
Poupko Kletenik was the head of school at the Seattle Hebrew Academy from 2006 until 2022. She was the first woman head of school at the Seattle Hebrew Academy. Poupko Kletenik wrote a monthly Jewish advice column called JQ for Seattle's The Jewish Sound. She was the recipient of a Covenant Foundation Award for Jewish educators in 2002.

== Personal life ==
Born and raised in Pittsburgh, Pennsylvania, Poupko Kletenik is the daughter of Gilda Twerski Novoseller Poupko, descendant of a Hasidic dynasty, and Baruch Poupko, rabbi for over 60 years of Shaare Torah Congregation in Pittsburgh.

She is married to Rabbi Moshe Kletenik, and they have four children, including Isaiah Kletenik and Gilah Kletenik.
