= Khyriv =

City in Lviv Oblast, Ukraine

Khyriv Хирів Chyrów
- City
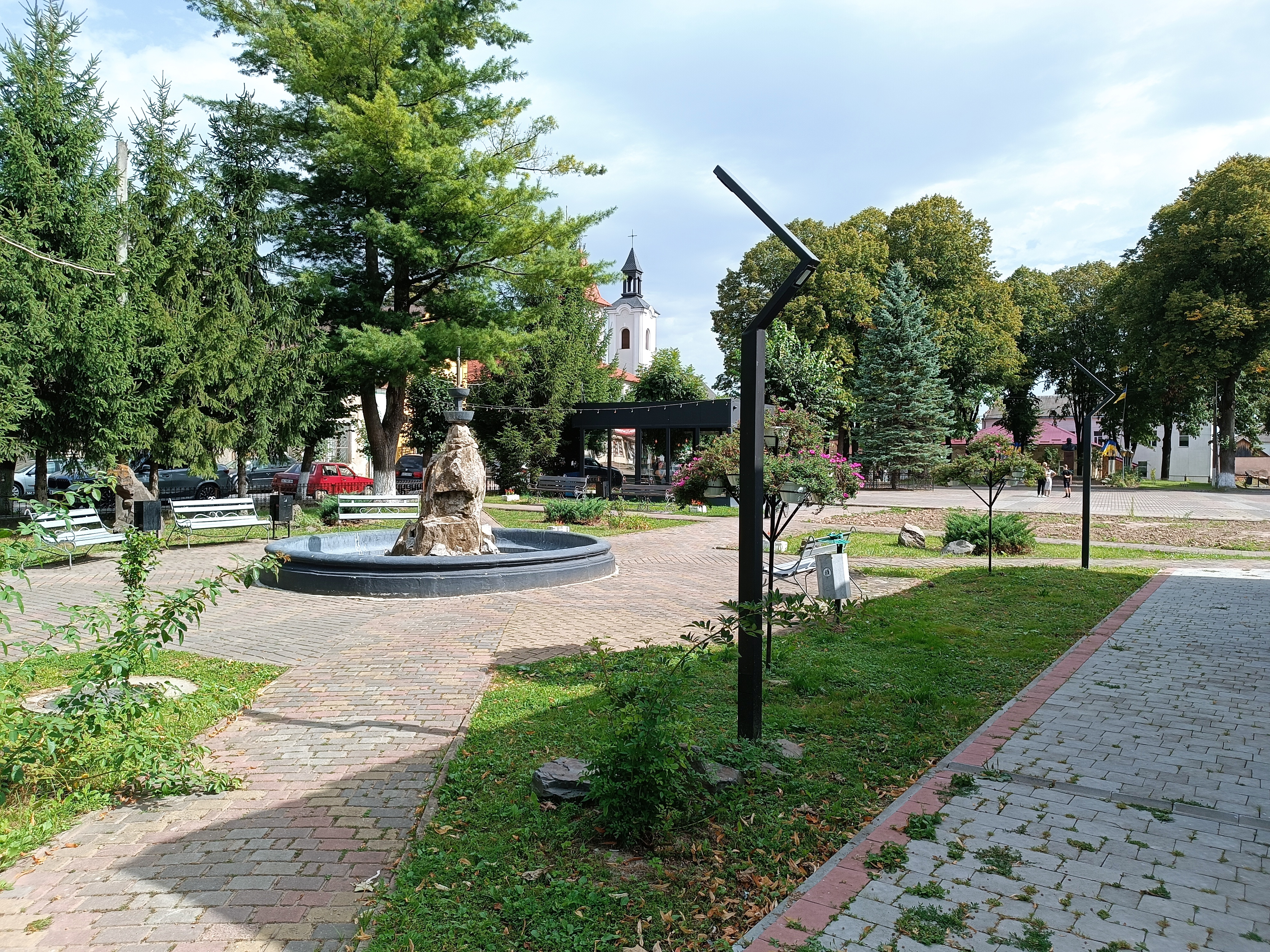
- Central Khyriv

- Flag Coat of arms

- Location within Lviv Oblast Location within Ukraine
- Coordinates: 49°32′N 22°51′E
- Country: Ukraine
- Oblast: Lviv Oblast
- Raion: Sambir Raion
- Hromada: Khyriv urban hromada
- First mentioned: 1374
- Town rights: 1528

Area
  - Total: 4.15 km^{2} (1.60 sq mi)
  - Land: 6.7 km^{2} (2.58 sq mi)

Population (2022)
  - Total: 4,249
  - Density: 1,020/km^{2} (2,650/sq mi)
- Demonym: Khirivsk (Ukrainian: Хирівська)
- Website: hyrivska-gromada.gov.ua

Khyriv (Ukrainian: Хирів, IPA: [ˈxɪr⁽ʲ⁾iu̯]; Polish: Chyrów) is a city in Sambir Raion, Lviv Oblast (region) of Ukraine with a population of around 4,249 (2022 estimate). It hosts the administration of Khyriv urban hromada, one of the hromadas of Ukraine.

It became known principally for the celebrated eponymous Jesuit secondary boys school founded there in 1886. The institution, which produced 6,000 alumni during its existence, ceased all activity when the then Polish town fell to Soviet forces in 1939.

== History ==
Khyriv is first mentioned in documents from 1374. At that time, it was the private property of the noble Polish family of Herburt, and was part of the Kingdom of Poland. Administratively it was located in the Przemyśl Land in the Ruthenian Voivodeship in the Lesser Poland Province. For over 400 years Chyrów was a private town of the powerful landowning Ossoliński and Mniszech families. In 1528 Chyrów, as it is called in Polish, received Magdeburg rights, and three years later, the first Roman Catholic church was founded there by Andrzej Tarło. The wooden church probably burned down during the Great Northern War, and in 1710, it was replaced by a brick structure. In 1740, a synagogue opened in the town.

In 1772, following the First Partition of Poland, Chyrów was annexed by the Habsburg Empire, and remained in Austrian Galicia until late 1918. In 1872 a rail connection was established with a station. In the 1880s, a state of the art vast purpose-built complex was erected there for a college on the outskirts of the town by the Polish province of the Society of Jesus. By 1913 the population of Chyrów was 3,400.

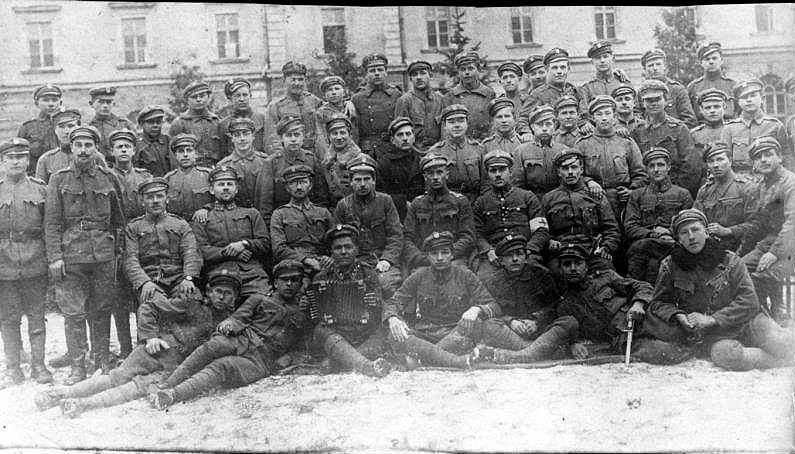
Polish–Ukrainian War 1918–1919. Polish defenders in front of the Chyrów Jesuit college, where they were stationed in 1919

During the Polish–Ukrainian War, Khyriv was the site of heavy Polish–Ukrainian fighting from late 1918 into early 1919. The war was won by Poland, and until the 1939 Invasion of Poland, Chyrów remained within the territory of the Second Polish Republic. According to the 1921 census, the population of Chyrów was 2,654, 68.2% Polish, 19.0% Ukrainian and 12.7% Jewish. In the interbellum period, Chyrów formed part of Sambor County, in the Lwow Voivodeship.

With the outbreak of the Second World War, on 27 September 1939 Khyriv was transferred by Germans under Soviet control as a result of the joint Invasion of Poland. The Red Army occupied the entire region until 1941, when it was seized by the German Wehrmacht until 1944, before being re-taken by forces of the Soviet Union. The Germans operated the Stalag 323 prisoner-of-war camp in the town before its relocation to Tarnopol. From 1944, the town and its surroundings was annexed by the USSR. Return of Khyriv to Poland was briefly considered following the 1951 Polish-Soviet Territorial Exchange, but was dismissed following the death of Joseph Stalin. With the dissolution of the Soviet Union in 1991, the town came under the jurisdiction of newly independent Ukraine.

Until 18 July 2020, Khyriv belonged to Staryi Sambir Raion. The raion was abolished in July 2020, as part of the administrative reform of Ukraine, which reduced the number of raions of Lviv Oblast to seven. The area of Staryi Sambir Raion was merged into Sambir Raion. That same year Khyriv became the administrative center of Khyriv Urban Hromada

In 2023 the train station in Khyriv was restored, almost 70 km of tracks were renovated.

== Geography ==
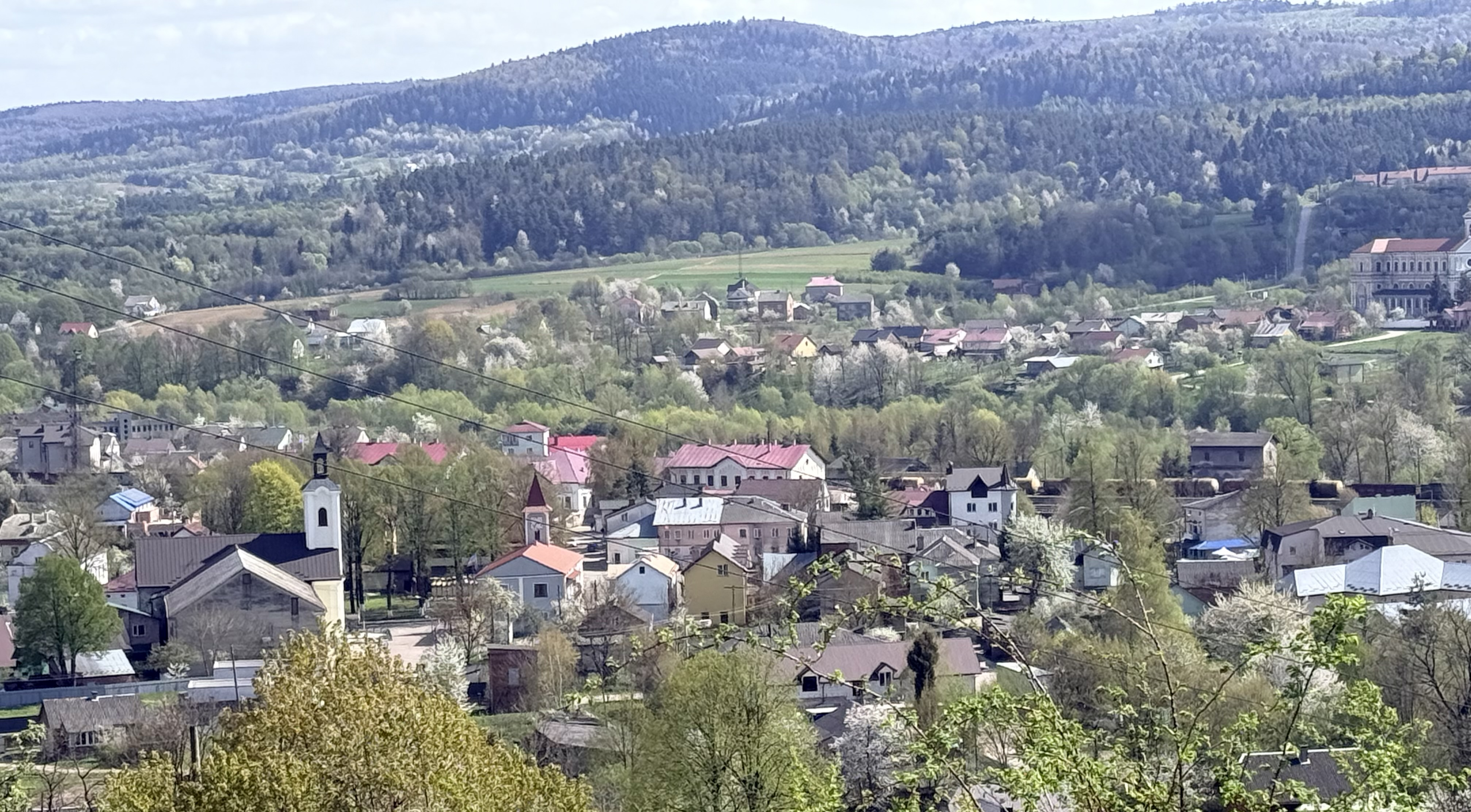
The view of Khyriv from above

the city of Khyriv is situated in the Pre-Carpathian region on the Strviazh river which divides the city into two banks.

== Public transport ==
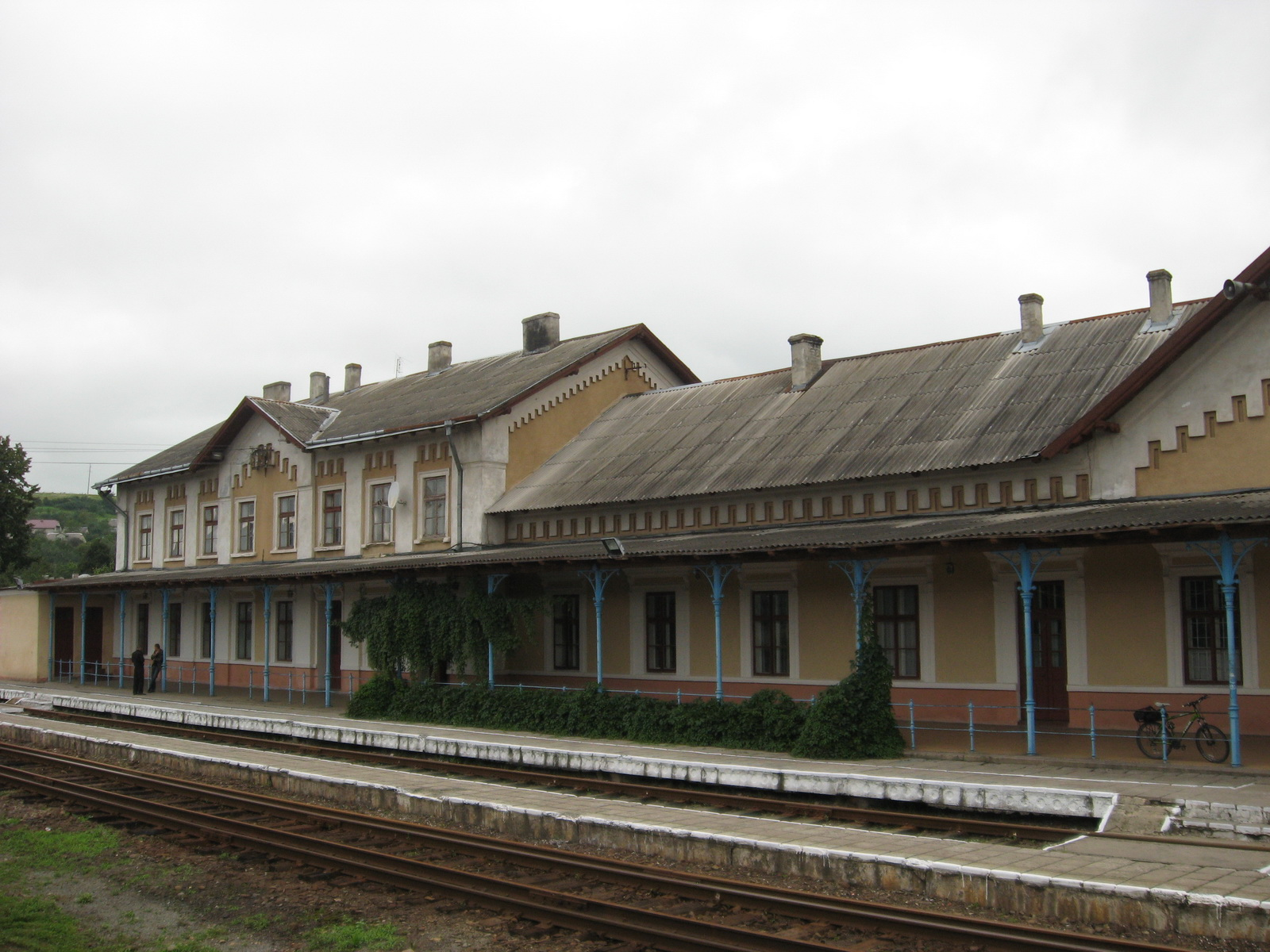
Khyriv railway station

A railway was built in Khyriv in 1870 and the first railway traffic officially opened in 1872 making Khyriv an important rail hub with two railway terminals, which significantly boosted the development of trade and crafts.

There is also a local bus station in Khyriv That connects the city with other regional hubs

== Notable residents ==
- Yaroslav Pasternak (1892–1969), Ukrainian archaeologist

== Gallery ==
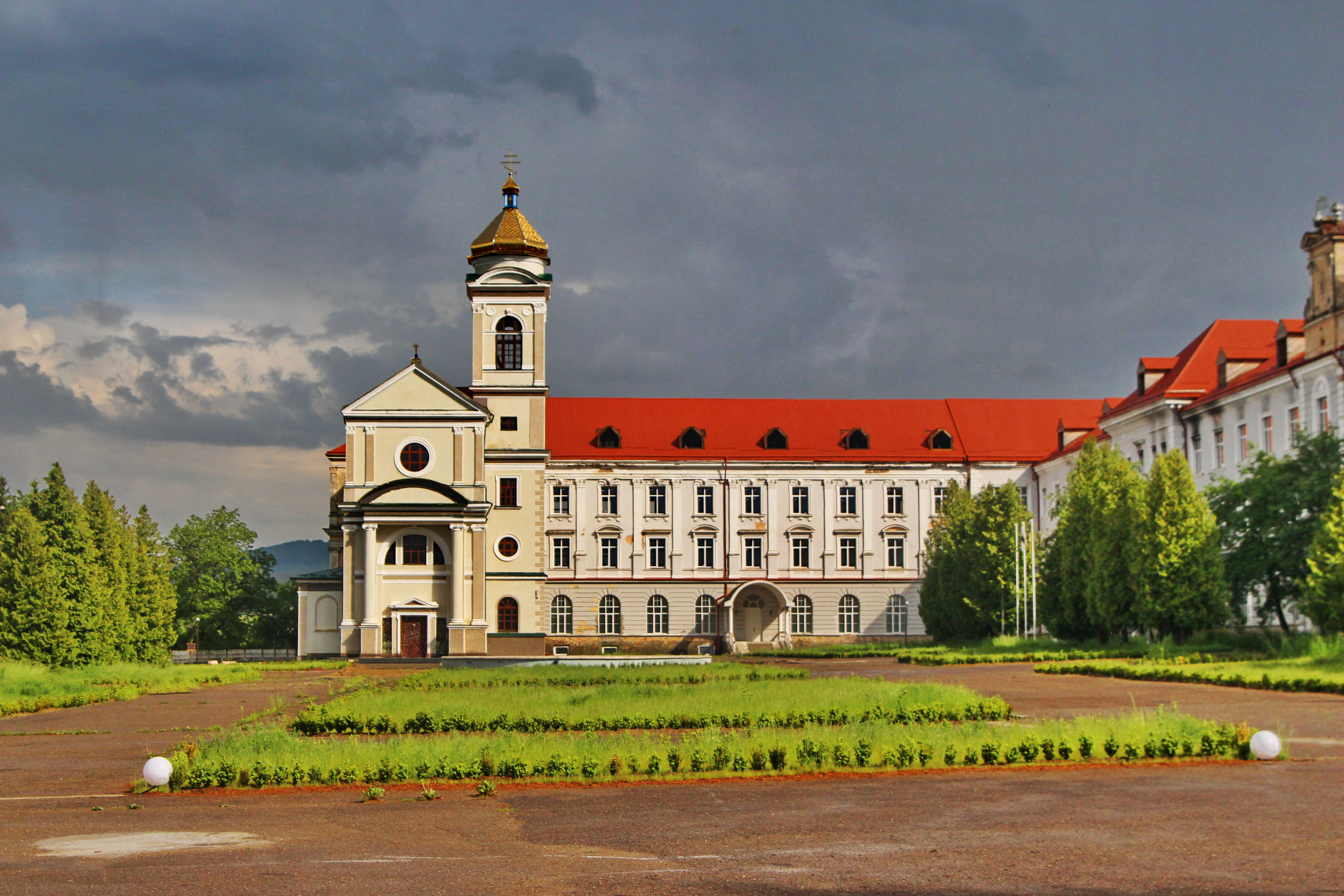
The former Jesuit College in Khyriv following reconstruction after the 2018 fire

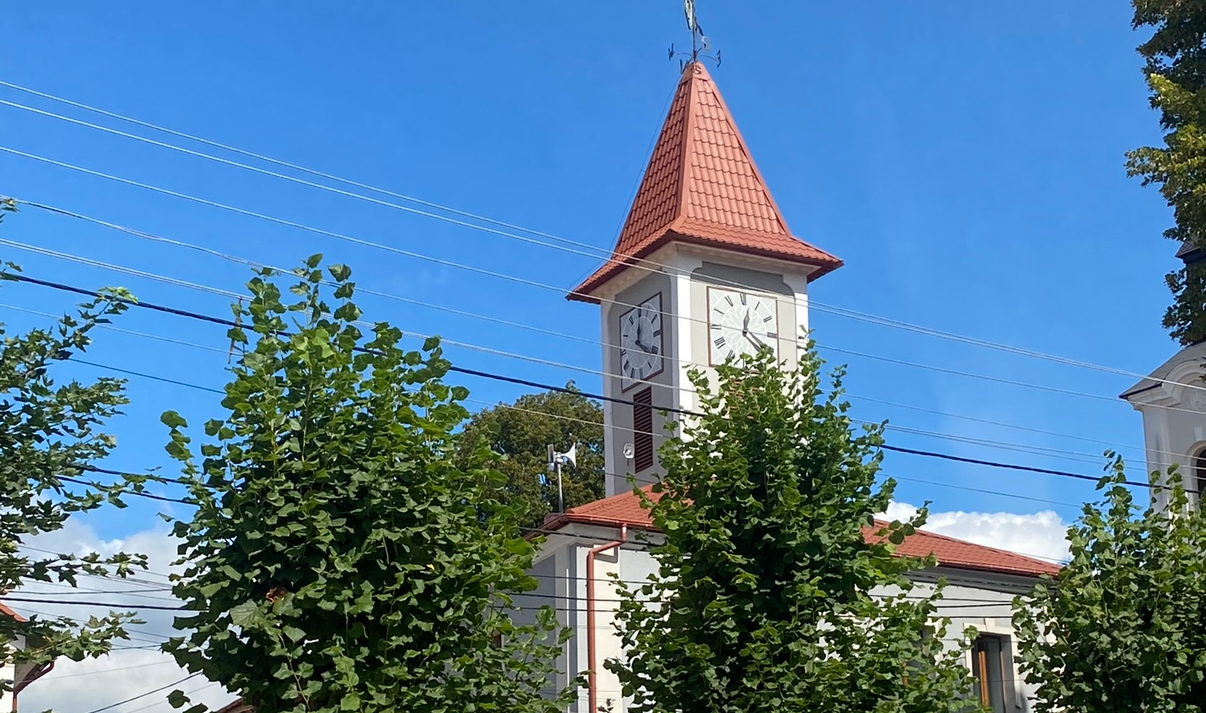
Town hall

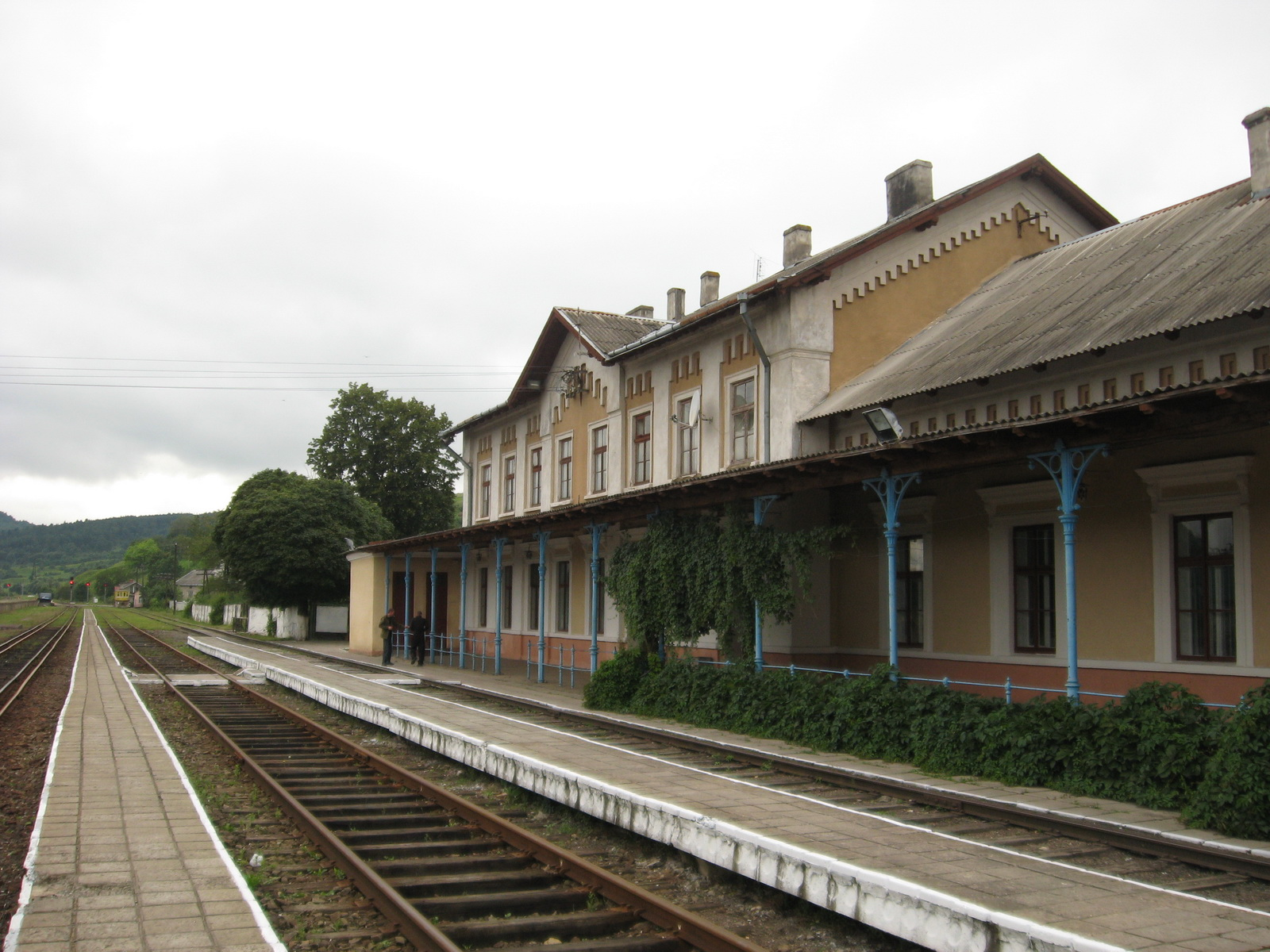
Train station

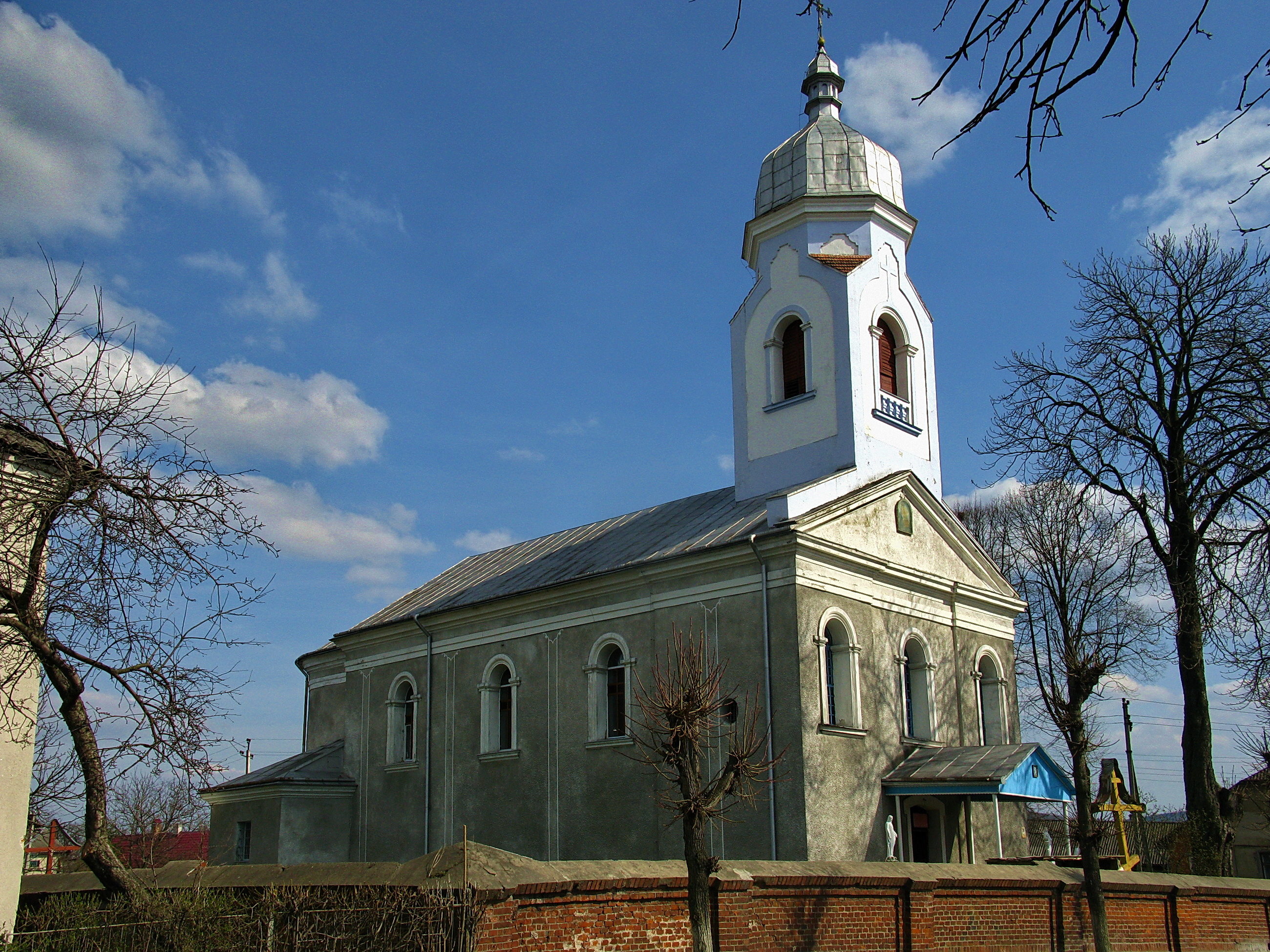
Church of the Nativity of the Holy Mother of God

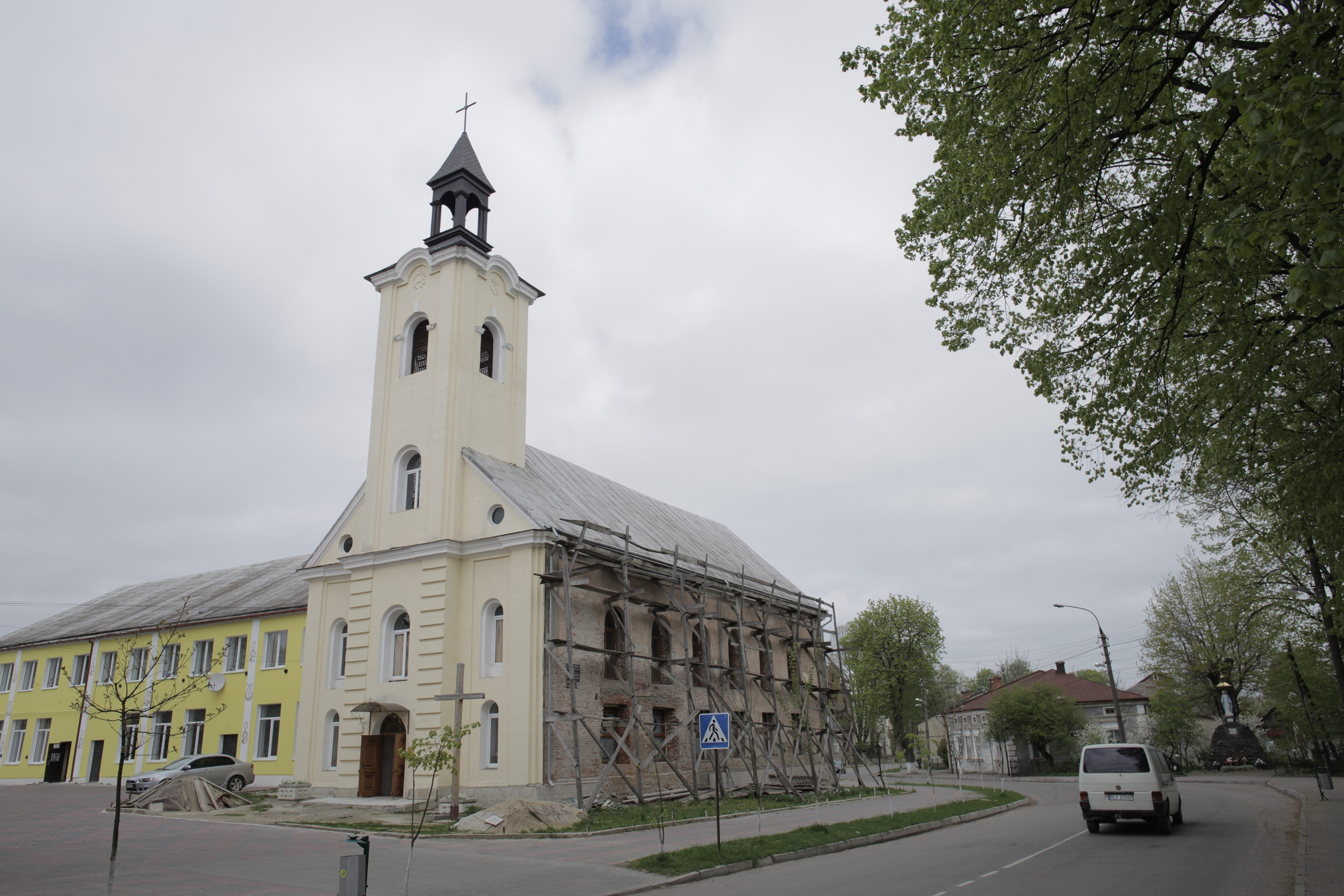
Church of St. Lawrence (2017)
