= Czerwińsk Floating Bridge =

Temporary floating bridge used by the Kingdom of Poland

Czerwińsk Floating Bridge over the Vistula Most łyżwowy pod Czerwińskiem nad Wisłą
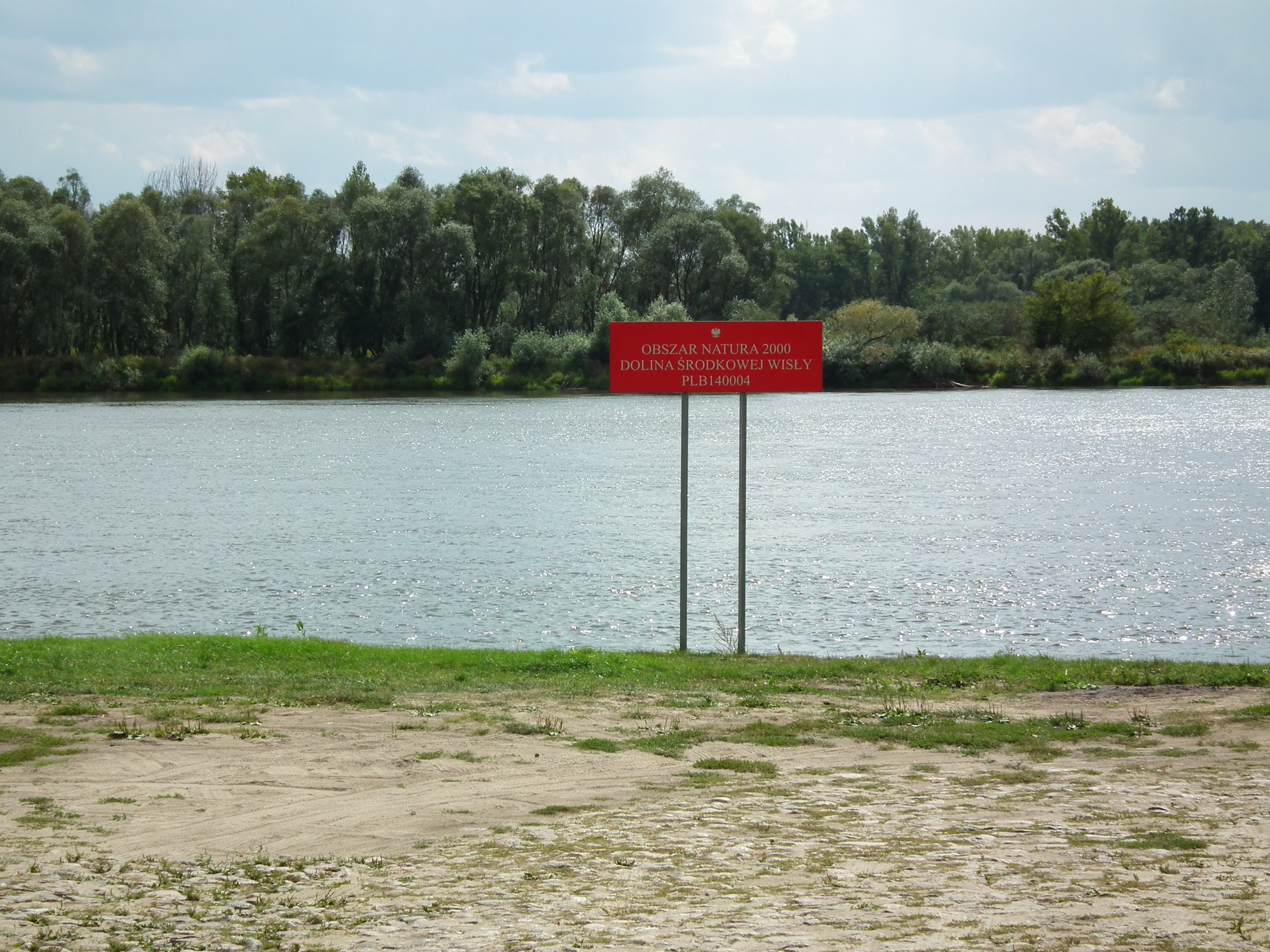
- Alleged site of crossing in 1410
- Coordinates: 52.3915600°N 20.3159720°E
- Locale: Czerwińsk nad Wisłą, Poland

Characteristics
- Total length: about 500 meters
- Width: 2.4 meters
- No. of spans: about 80

History
- Built: 30 June 1410
- Rebuilt: 27 September 1410 (near Przypust for the duration of the crossing)
- Destroyed: 3 July 1410

Location
- Interactive map of Czerwińsk Floating Bridge over the Vistula

The Czerwińsk Floating Bridge over the Vistula was a temporary floating bridge used by the forces of the Kingdom of Poland during the summer campaign of 1410 in the Polish–Lithuanian–Teutonic War.

Accounts of its use are found in the anonymous Chronicle of the Conflict and in the Annals of Jan Długosz, where it is referred to as a "bridge on boats". The construction was prepared secretly during the winter and spring of 1410, floated down the Vistula, and assembled above Czerwińsk on June 30, enabling Polish units to efficiently and swiftly cross the river within three days. Afterwards, the bridge was dismantled and floated to Płock. It was reused at the end of September 1410 near Przypust, where Polish forces were crossing back from Prussia.

This structure provided a faster crossing of the Vistula, which came as a surprise to the Teutonic command and facilitated the concentration of Polish-Lithuanian forces at Czerwińsk. This had a significant impact on the further course of the campaign, and thus on the Battle of Grunwald. The idea of using such a construction, as well as its execution and efficient use, is considered a major success of contemporary Polish military engineering.

== Bridge type ==
This structure is variously referred to as a pontoon bridge in different works, which according to Professor Barbara Rymsza from the Research Institute of Roads and Bridges in Warsaw, is not a precise term. It should be used for bridges based on boats (pontoons) transported to the crossing site over land. However, in situations where boats are towed or floated down the river to the assembly site, as in the construction of 1410, the term "floating bridge" should be used.

== Reason of construction ==
The decision to build the bridge was made in early December 1409 during a council meeting in Brześć Kujawski attended by King Władysław Jagiełło, Grand Duke Vytautas, and their closest advisors. It resulted from the choice of Czerwińsk as the concentration point for the Polish-Lithuanian forces. The bridge was intended to facilitate the crossing of the Vistula river by the banners of the Kingdom of Poland, coming from the west (from Greater Poland) and the south (Lesser Poland and Red Ruthenia), as well as reinforcements from the Masovian dukes. Subsequently, on the northern bank of the river, these units would join forces with the troops of the Grand Duchy of Lithuania, marching from the east from the direction of Pułtusk after crossing the Narew river. Furthermore, the use of this construction in Czerwińsk allowed for keeping the Teutonic Order commanders uncertain about the main direction of the Polish-Lithuanian army's attack, which was aimed at Malbork, in order to lead to a decisive battle.

== Preparations ==
The elements of the crossing were clandestinely prepared during the winter and spring months of 1410, upstream of the Vistula river, near Kozienice, close to the Radom Forest, from which materials for construction were obtained. The supervision of the works was carried out by the Radom starosta, Dobrogost Czarny of Odrzywołek, of the Nałęcz coat of arms. The direct executor of the task was the master carpenter Jarosław, about whom little else is known, although he may have been identical to Jarosław, who received royal privilege on 14 February 1410, to build a mill and sawmill on the Wieprz river near Krasnystaw.

The choice of Kozienice as the place of work was due to the proximity of the forest and the fact that it was one of the last major settlements on the Vistula river, close to the area of military concentration, which was not located within the territory of the Duchy of Masovia. Most likely, the work was carried out by peasants from the starosta's estate under the direction of town craftsmen. The expenses were covered by the king.

== Usage ==
According to the plan, the bridge was floated down the Vistula river, most likely on 29 June 1410. It was assembled in just half a day on June 30. It was set up somewhere above the Czerwińsk monastery, although it is currently difficult to precisely locate this place (it may have been along the Kromnów – Zdziarka or Kromnów – Czerwińsk line).

According to the accounts in the Chronicle of the Conflict and in the Annals of Jan Długosz, the crossing of the Polish forces with their accompanying baggage, artillery, and other military equipment began on the same day and proceeded without any incidents over the following days until July 2. On June 30, the king and most of the troops from Lesser Poland found themselves on the northern bank of the Vistula, where they set up camp. It took the following days for the remaining Polish units, gradually arriving at the concentration area, to join them. The crossing itself proceeded in good, orderly fashion – as Długosz reports, selected knights guarded the entrances to the bridge to prevent confusion and crowding, and the exits were also secured with massive beams, which prevented deviation from the designated path. A guide accompanied each unit. It appears that priority in using the bridge was given to baggage trains and artillery, while some cavalry units may have swum across the river due to the low water level that summer.

It is unknown who supervised the floating of the structure, as well as its assembly and the crossing itself. Regarding the latter task, Długosz emphasized the role of the king, a view endorsed by Stefan Maria Kuczyński, highlighting the monarch's involvement down to the smallest details, supported by a later mention in a Teutonic document from 1412 regarding Jagiełło's role in directing the construction of the castle in Veliuona. However, it is difficult to imagine that the king personally directed everything without the assistance of others.

The crossing was completed without technical damage or major disruptions by several tens of thousands of troops, along with artillery, baggage trains, and camp followers. Their exact number is difficult to determine, with various estimates presented in scholarly literature – 18,000 cavalry, 4,000 infantry, 30 cannons, and 8,000 wagons; 18,000 cavalry and 2,000 infantry; 25,000 cavalry, 4,000 infantry, and 8,000–9,000 wagons; approximately 20,000 cavalry and an indeterminate number of camp followers. As for the size of the baggage train, Andrzej Nadolski critically assessed estimates ranging from 8,000 to 11,000 wagons, based on the assumption that each lance fournie had at least one wagon, in addition to vehicles from royal cities for transporting cannons, ammunition, and provisions. In his opinion, such calculations should be significantly reduced based on specific examples from slightly later times (e.g., the known size of the Polish baggage train at the Battle of Chojnice), and it can be assumed that in the Polish army in 1410, one wagon was assigned to every 5–6 combatants.

After the crossing, the bridge was dismantled and floated to Płock to be reused later. This occurred at the end of September 1410, when the Polish army was returning from Prussia. After the conclusion of the campaign in the Dobrzyń Land, the king with court retinue, baggage train, urban contingents, and part of the levy of knights stood on September 25 on the Vistula near Przypust (near Aleksandrów Kujawski). There, the bridge was set up again, although this time assembly encountered previously unknown technical difficulties. As a result, the crossing took place only after two days, on September 27.

The further fate of the structure remains unknown. It has been suggested that parts of it were used during subsequent wars with the Teutonic Order, when other crossings were established on the Vistula (near Zakroczym in 1414, Czerwińsk in 1422, or Nieszawa in 1454). However, this seems unlikely, as the elements of the bridge would have required special maintenance.

== Construction ==
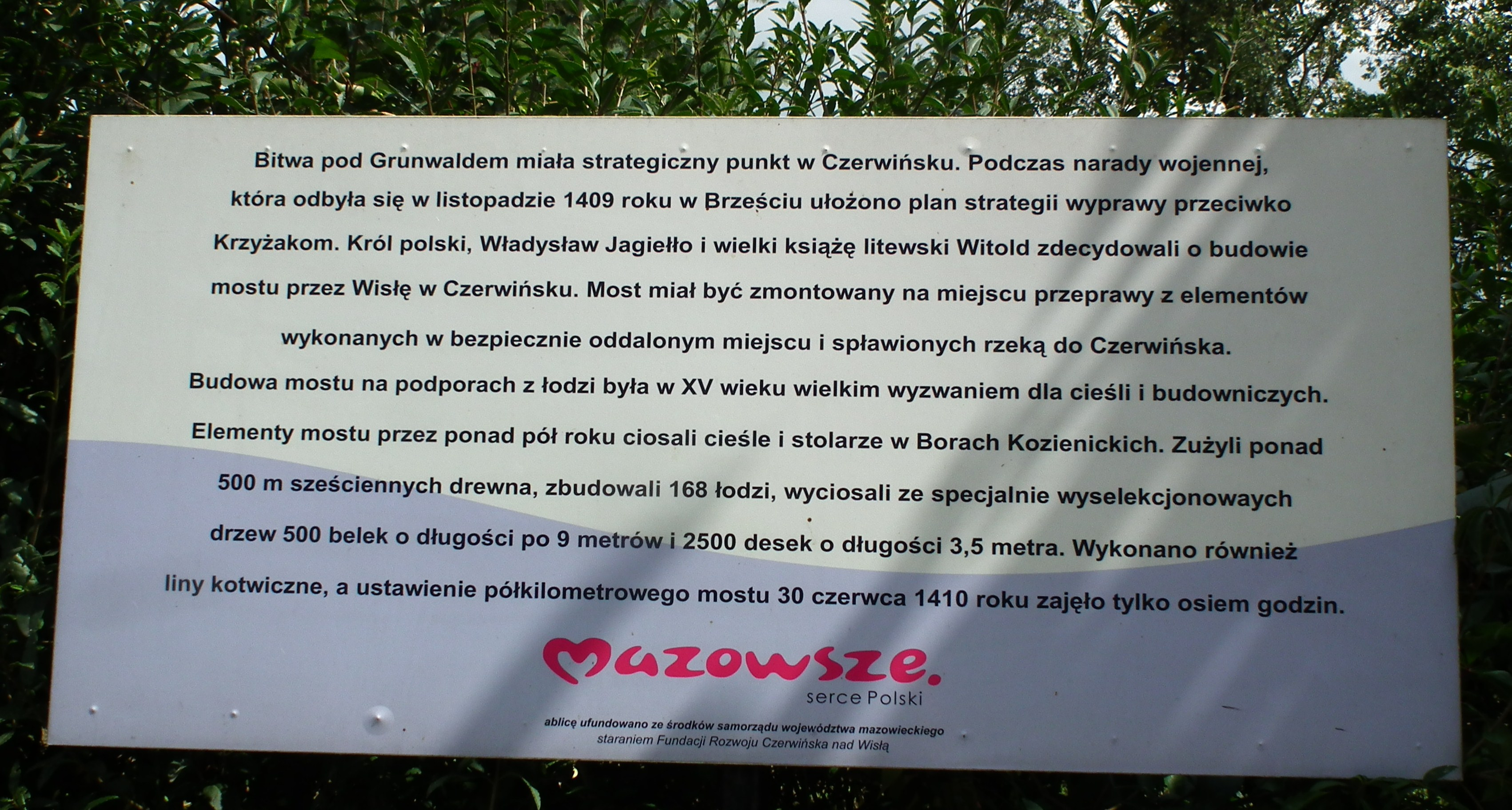
Information board dedicated to the construction of the 1410 bridge at its presumed location

The exact details of the bridge construction did not survive, likely due to keeping its construction secret. In the Chronicle of the Conflict, it was described briefly, emphasizing only the uniqueness of the construction and the fact that no injuries occurred during the crossing. Długosz provided slightly more details about this bridge. Based on his account, attempts have been made to reconstruct the dimensions of the structure, yielding various results.

Approximately 500 nine-meter-long beams and 2,500 3.5-meter-long planks were estimated to have been used for assembling the bridge, along with 168 to 200 boats, likely flat-bottomed and spindle-shaped, stable, with lengths of 8–12 meters and widths of 2–3 meters, on which the construction was to be supported. For this purpose, about 500 m³ of wood from selected trees of high structural quality were used. Additionally, a large quantity of anchor ropes was twisted. The floating likely occurred partially assembled, in the form of catamarans. The number of spans could have reached 80.

The bridge was approximately 500 meters long, as this was the width of the Vistula river in the vicinity of Czerwińsk. However, it is possible that it was shorter, which could have been due to the terrain around the river, the presence of the Kępa Śladowska island, and numerous sandbars that could have been used for the crossing (there might have been several sections of the bridge between these islands and the shore). Its width was probably around 2.4 meters, and the bridge was covered with fascine and a layer of earth fill, without railings.

== Significance ==
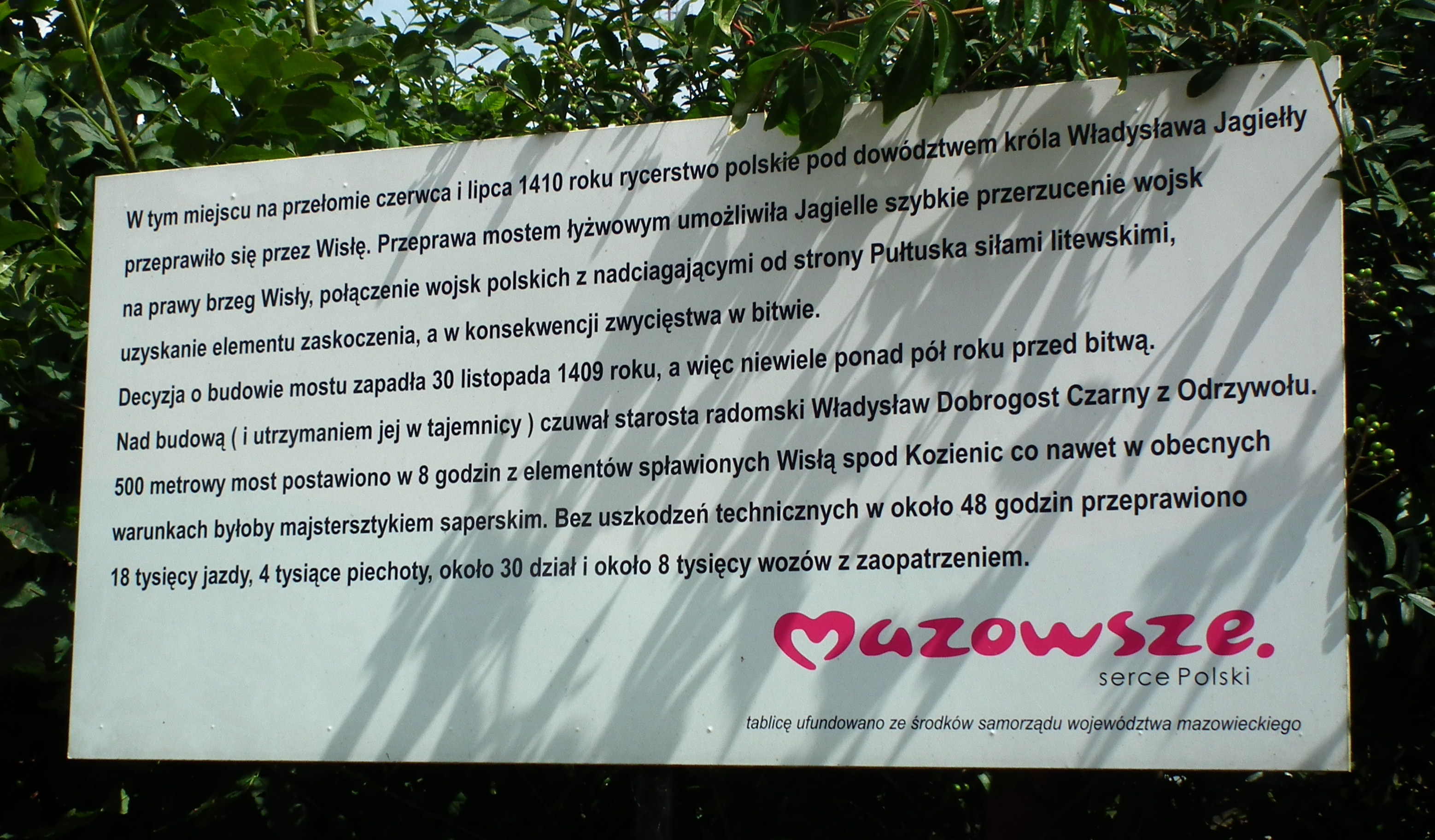
Information board dedicated to the significance of the 1410 bridge at its presumed location

The Czerwińsk Floating Bridge facilitated a swift crossing of the Vistula river, accelerating the concentration of Polish and Lithuanian forces. After crossing the river at this point, they could strike at the lands of Dobrzyń, Chełmno, and Pomesania, heading towards Malbork. The threat to the heart of the Teutonic Order itself forced the Knights to accept battle in open field, leading to the Battle of Grunwald. Additionally, the speed of the crossing surprised the Teutonic leadership, as evidenced by mentions of it in their correspondence.

However, it is difficult to determine the extent to which the construction itself was extraordinary. Długosz presented in his Annals an account of a meeting in Toruń (July 3) between the Grand Master Ulrich von Jungingen and Dobiesław Skoraczewski, a Polish knight serving the Hungarian envoys, Stibor of Stiboricz, and Mikołaj Gara. They sent him to the Polish camp, where he was on June 30. According to the chronicler, the Grand Master did not believe in the rapid crossing of the Vistula by the enemy, citing reports from his scouts that the Polish forces were on the river but unable to cross it. Moreover, he treated the stories about the bridge as unserious, claiming he was informed of its construction in the air. When Skoraczewski, who had seen the structure, began to explain its actual appearance, Jungingen dismissed his words as lies or too biased assessment of the power of the King of Poland due to the origin of the interlocutor. It is possible that this account is not reliable but rather the result of deliberate, biased portrayal of the Grand Master in the chronicle as arrogant and full of pride, disdainful of the opponent. It is also possible that the Grand Master quickly learned about the bridge and crossing, and the conversation with the Polish knight confirmed the information he had received earlier.

Both the Chronicle of the Conflict and Długosz's account describe the bridge at Czerwińsk as a novelty, previously unseen in Poland. In Polish scholarly literature, this construction is considered a bold and innovative solution, a spectacular success of contemporary military engineering, particularly in terms of assembly speed and the length of the bridge. It is also acknowledged as the first Polish bridge for which a written account of its operation has been preserved.

Floating bridges were not entirely uncommon in medieval Europe. Such structures were known at least since the late 11th century; for example, they were used to connect the banks of the Nogat river. Additionally, in the summer campaign of 1410, a similar bridge was assembled on the Narew river near Pułtusk for the crossing of Lithuanian forces. Descriptions of such technical solutions also appear in treatises on the art of war from that era. Chronologically closest to the Great War with the Teutonic Order was Conrad Kyeser's Bellifortis, a work completed around 1405, richly illustrated, where both in the description and in the miniature, a floating bridge is depicted, which may resemble the one at Czerwińsk.

== Commemoration ==
In January 2010, on the occasion of the 600th anniversary of the Battle of Grunwald, there was an idea to create a replica of the bridge to commemorate this object and popularize knowledge about it. Work began at the Warsaw Institute of Roads and Bridges under the direction of Professor Barbara Rymsza. Due to the navigability of the Vistula river, the construction of a full-size replica was not considered. Initially, it was planned to build a pier in the shape of a horseshoe, with two sides resembling modern military bridges, and one side being a reconstruction of two spans of the 1410 bridge. Engineering units of the Polish Army were supposed to be involved in the construction, but this did not succeed due to the need to fight floods in May and June 2010. Ultimately, with the involvement of local authorities, a bridge-building company from Warsaw, assistance from the Polish House in Pułtusk, and the Volunteer Fire Brigade from Nowy Dwór Mazowiecki, a replica consisting of a span supported on boats and a shore span with horse beams was built. It was ceremoniously unveiled on 26 June 2010, as part of the 600th anniversary celebrations of the Battle of Grunwald in Czerwińsk, combined with the historical picnic Through Czerwińsk to Grunwald. It was only a temporary attraction and was dismantled after three days.

Meanwhile, in Kozienice, in the palace-park complex, there is a multi-figure monument commemorating the construction of the bridge along with a replica of its fragment. Erected on a small hill, the monument depicts Władysław Jagiełło on horseback, whose bridle is held by Zbigniew Oleśnicki (the royal secretary during the Great War), while the starosta Dobrogost Czarny presents the monarch with plans for the construction of the bridge. Below, there is a figure of Master Jarosław bowing to the ruler, with carpenters and blacksmiths at work behind him. Behind them is a replica of two spans of the bridge. The monument was unveiled on 19 June 2010, as part of the Kozienice celebrations of the 600th anniversary of the Battle of Grunwald.

Memorial in Kozienice – Construction of the Floating Bridge

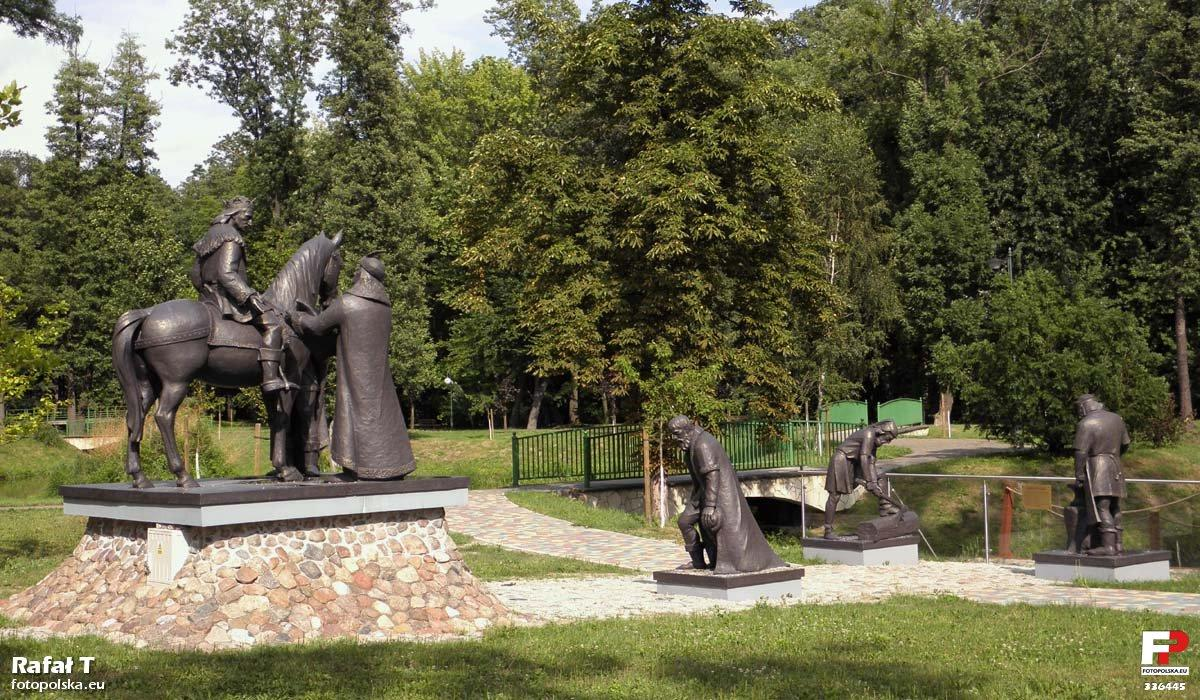
General view (August 2012)

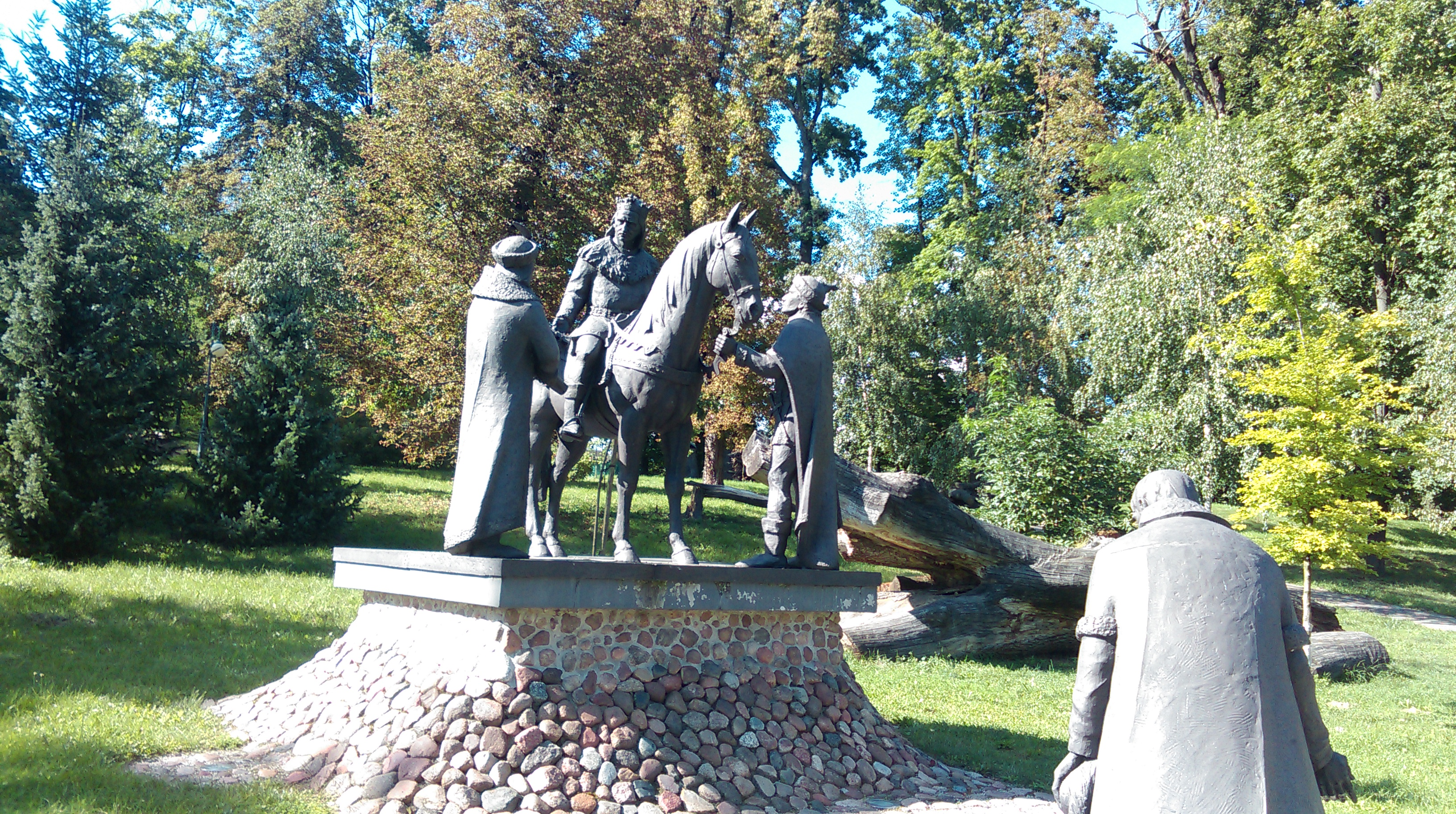
Statues of Jagiełło with Oleśnicki and starosta Dobrogost, on the right a statue of Master Jarosław (August 2016)

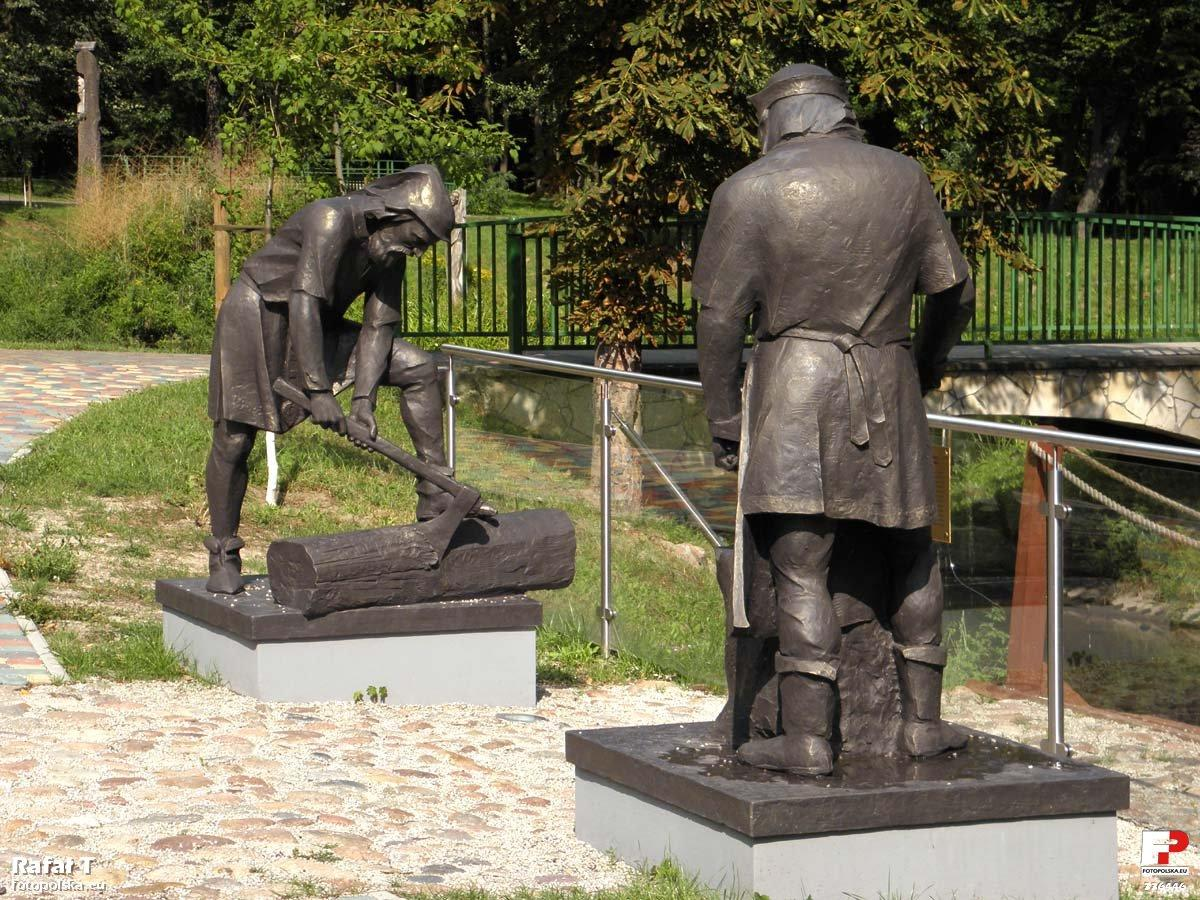
Figures of craftsmen, carpenters and blacksmiths (August 2012)

== Bibliography ==
- Dzikowski, Tadeusz (2010). "Wpływ inżynierii wojskowej na wiktorię grunwaldzką". In Białas, Marcin (ed.). Wsparcie inżynieryjne w wielkiej wojnie z Zakonem Krzyżackim 1409 – 1411. Sesja popularno-naukowa z okazji 600-lecia bitwy pod Grunwaldem w 1410 roku. Warsaw: Centralna Biblioteka Wojskowa im. Marszałka Józefa Piłsudskiego. ISBN 978-83-89875-32-7.
- Jóźwiak, Sławomir; Kwiatkowski, Krzysztof; Szweda, Adam; Szybkowski, Sobiesław (2010). Wojna Polski i Litwy z Zakonem Krzyżackim w latach 1409–1411. Malbork: Wydawnictwo Muzeum Zamkowego w Malborku. ISBN 978-83-60518-33-5.
- Kuczyński, Stefan Maria (1987). Wielka wojna z Zakonem Krzyżackim w latach 1409–1411. Vol. V. Warsaw: Wydawnictwo Ministerstwa Obrony Narodowej.
- "Most Królewski w Kozienicach". Kozienicki Dom Kultury (in Polish).
- "Most zwycięstwa. Z prof. Barbarą Rymszą z Instytutu Badawczego Dróg i Mostów rozmawia Włodzimierz Kalicki". wyborcza.pl (in Polish). 2010-07-14.
- Nadolski, Andrzej (1999). Grunwald 1410. Historyczne bitwy (III ed.). Warsaw: Dom Wydawniczy Bellona. ISBN 83-11-08620-6.
- Nadolski, Andrzej (2010). Grunwald. Problemy wybrane (II ed.). Wodzisław Śląski – Łódź: Wydawnictwo "Templum", Instytut Archeologii i Etnologii PAN. ISBN 978-83-929218-6-8.
- Nowak, Tadeusz Marian (1956). "Uwagi o technice budowy mostów polowych w Polsce w w. XV do XVII". Studia i materiały do historii sztuki wojennej. II.
- "Piknik historyczny Przez Czerwińsk pod Grunwald". Urząd Gminy Czerwińsk nad Wisłą (in Polish). Archived from the original on 2016-09-11.
- Potkowski, Edward (1994). Grunwald. Dzieje narodu i państwa polskiego. Vol. I-11. Kraków: Krajowa Agencja Wydawnicza. ISBN 83-03-03641-6.
- Rymsza, Barbara (2010). "O budowie repliki Mostu Jagiełły". In Białas, Marcin (ed.). Wsparcie inżynieryjne w wielkiej wojnie z Zakonem Krzyżackim 1409 – 1411. Sesja popularno-naukowa z okazji 600-lecia bitwy pod Grunwaldem w 1410 roku. Warsaw: Centralna Biblioteka Wojskowa im. Marszałka Józefa Piłsudskiego. ISBN 978-83-89875-32-7.
- Sikorski, Janusz (1975). Zarys historii wojskowości powszechnej do końca wieku XIX (II ed.). Warsaw: Wydawnictwo Ministerstwa Obrony Narodowej.
- "Uroczyste przecięcie wstęgi". Instytut Badawczy Dróg i Mostów (in Polish). 2010-06-28. Archived from the original on 2016-09-17.
- "Władysławowi Jagielle w podzięce". Polska Niezwykła (in Polish).
