= Grodziec =

Grodziec may refer to the following places in Poland:

- Grodziec, Greater Poland Voivodeship (west-central Poland)
- Grodziec, Lower Silesian Voivodeship (south-west Poland)
  - Grodziec Castle
- Grodziec, Pomeranian Voivodeship (north Poland)
- Grodziec, Silesian Voivodeship (south Poland)
- Grodziec, Masovian Voivodeship (east-central Poland)
- Grodziec, Namysłów County in Opole Voivodeship (south-west Poland)
- Grodziec, Gmina Niemodlin in Opole Voivodeship (south-west Poland)
- Grodziec, Gmina Ozimek in Opole Voivodeship (south-west Poland)
- Grodziec Mały in Lower Silesian Voivodeship (south-west Poland)
- Gmina Grodziec, in west-central Poland
