= Goławin =

- Village
- Location within Poland
- Coordinates: 52°25′54″N 20°27′15″E
- Country: Poland
- Voivodeship: Masovian
- County: Płońsk
- Gmina: Czerwińsk nad Wisłą
- Area code: (+48) 24

Goławin [ɡɔˈwavin] is a village in the administrative district of Gmina Czerwińsk nad Wisłą, within Płońsk County, Masovian Voivodeship, in east-central Poland.
