= Gmina Czerwińsk nad Wisłą =

Gmina Czerwińsk nad Wisłą Czerwińsk nad Wisłą Commune
- Gmina
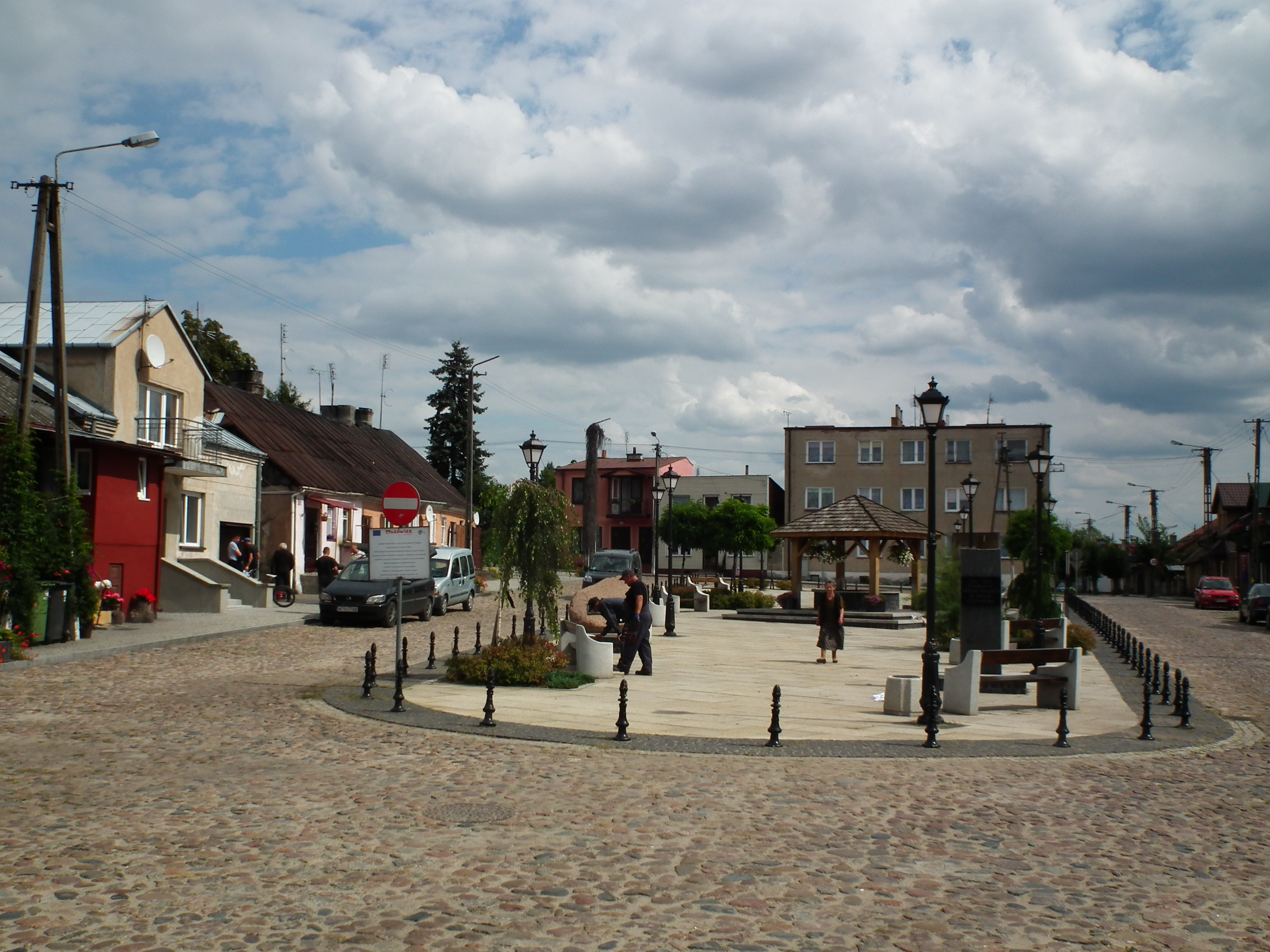

- Coat of arms

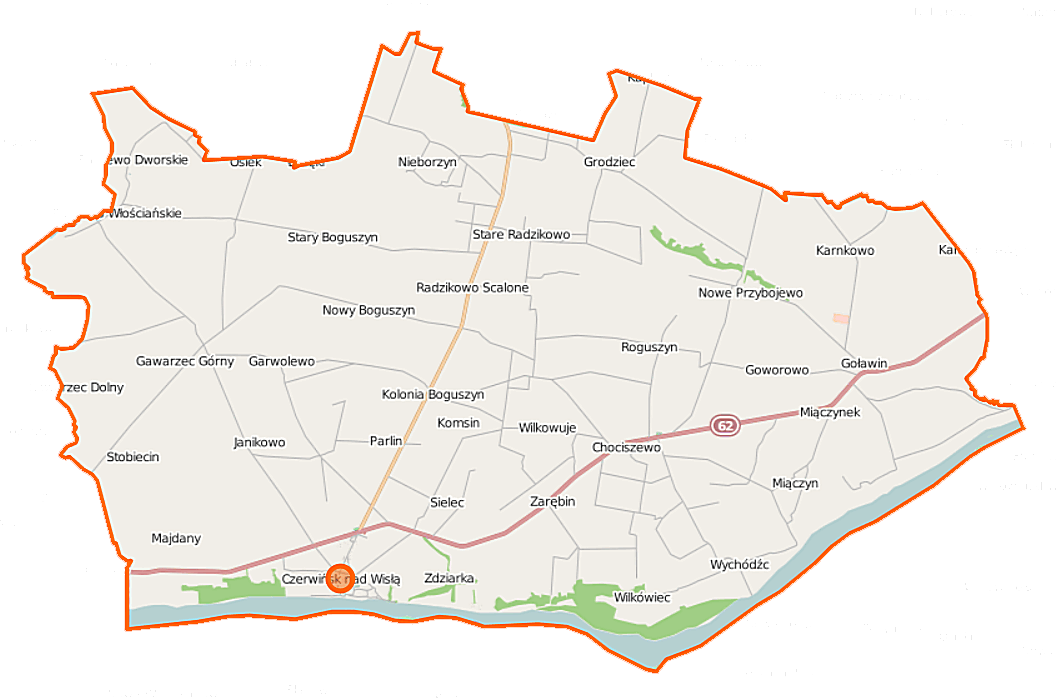
- Coordinates (Czerwińsk nad Wisłą): 52°23′N 20°18′E
- Country: Poland
- Voivodeship: Masovian
- County: Płońsk
- Seat: Czerwińsk nad Wisłą

Area
  - Total: 146.07 km^{2} (56.40 sq mi)

Population (2013)
  - Total: 7,914
  - Density: 54.18/km^{2} (140.3/sq mi)
- Website: http://www.czerwinsk.pl/

Gmina Czerwińsk nad Wisłą is a rural gmina (administrative district) in Płońsk County, Masovian Voivodeship, in east-central Poland. Its seat is the village of Czerwińsk nad Wisłą, which lies approximately 29 kilometres (18 mi) south of Płońsk and 52 km (32 mi) west of Warsaw.

The gmina covers an area of 146.07 square kilometres (56.4 sq mi), and as of 2006 its total population is 7,787 (7,914 in 2013).

== Villages ==
Gmina Czerwińsk nad Wisłą contains the villages and settlements of:

- Chociszewo
- Czerwińsk nad Wisłą
- Garwolewo
- Gawarzec Dolny
- Gawarzec Górny
- Goławin
- Goworowo
- Grodziec
- Janikowo
- Karnkowo
- Komsin
- Kuchary-Skotniki
- Łbowo
- Miączyn
- Miączynek
- Nieborzyn
- Nowe Przybojewo
- Nowe Radzikowo
- Nowy Boguszyn
- Osiek
- Parlin
- Radzikowo Scalone
- Raszewo Dworskie
- Raszewo Włościańskie
- Roguszyn
- Sielec
- Stare Przybojewo
- Stare Radzikowo
- Stary Boguszyn
- Stobiecin
- Wilkówiec
- Wilkowuje
- Wola
- Wólka Przybójewska
- Wychódźc
- Zarębin
- Zdziarka

== Neighbouring gminas ==
Gmina Czerwińsk nad Wisłą is bordered by the gminas of Brochów, Leoncin, Naruszewo, Wyszogród, Zakroczym and Załuski.
