= Czerwińsk nad Wisłą =

- Town
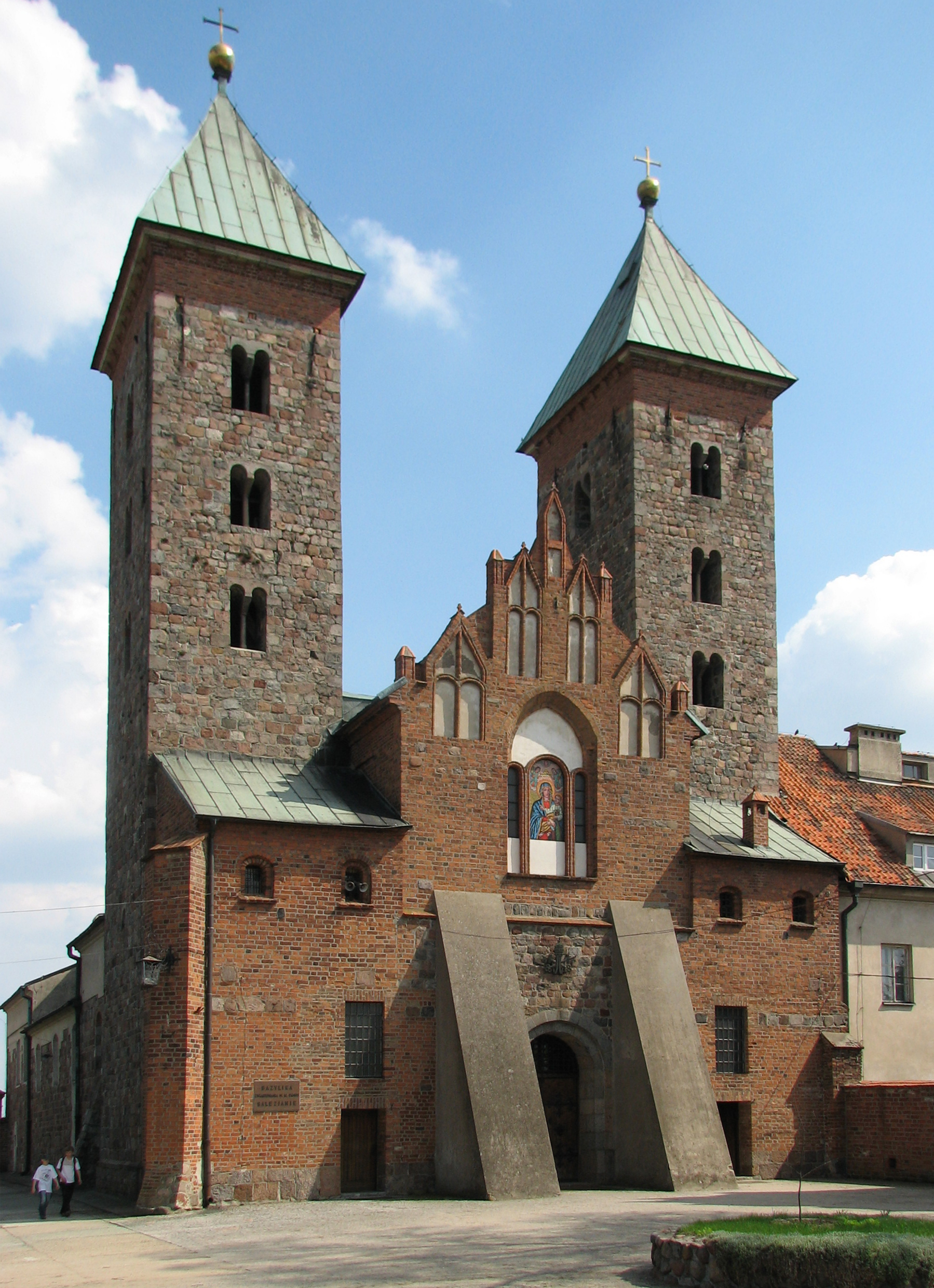
- Romanesque Abbey Church in Czerwińsk

- Coat of arms

- Location within Poland
- Coordinates: 52°23′44″N 20°18′34″E
- Country: Poland
- Voivodeship: Masovian
- County: Płońsk
- Gmina: Czerwińsk nad Wisłą
- First mentioned: 1155
- Town rights: 1373
- Population: 1,200
- Time zone: UTC+1 (CET)
  - Summer (DST): UTC+2 (CEST)
- Vehicle registration: WPN
- Website: http://www.czerwinsk.pl/

Czerwińsk nad Wisłą [ˈt͡ʂɛrviɲsk ˌnad ˈviswɔ̃] is a town in Płońsk County, Masovian Voivodeship, in central Poland. It is the seat of the gmina (administrative district) called Gmina Czerwińsk nad Wisłą. The town has a population of 1,200.

== History ==
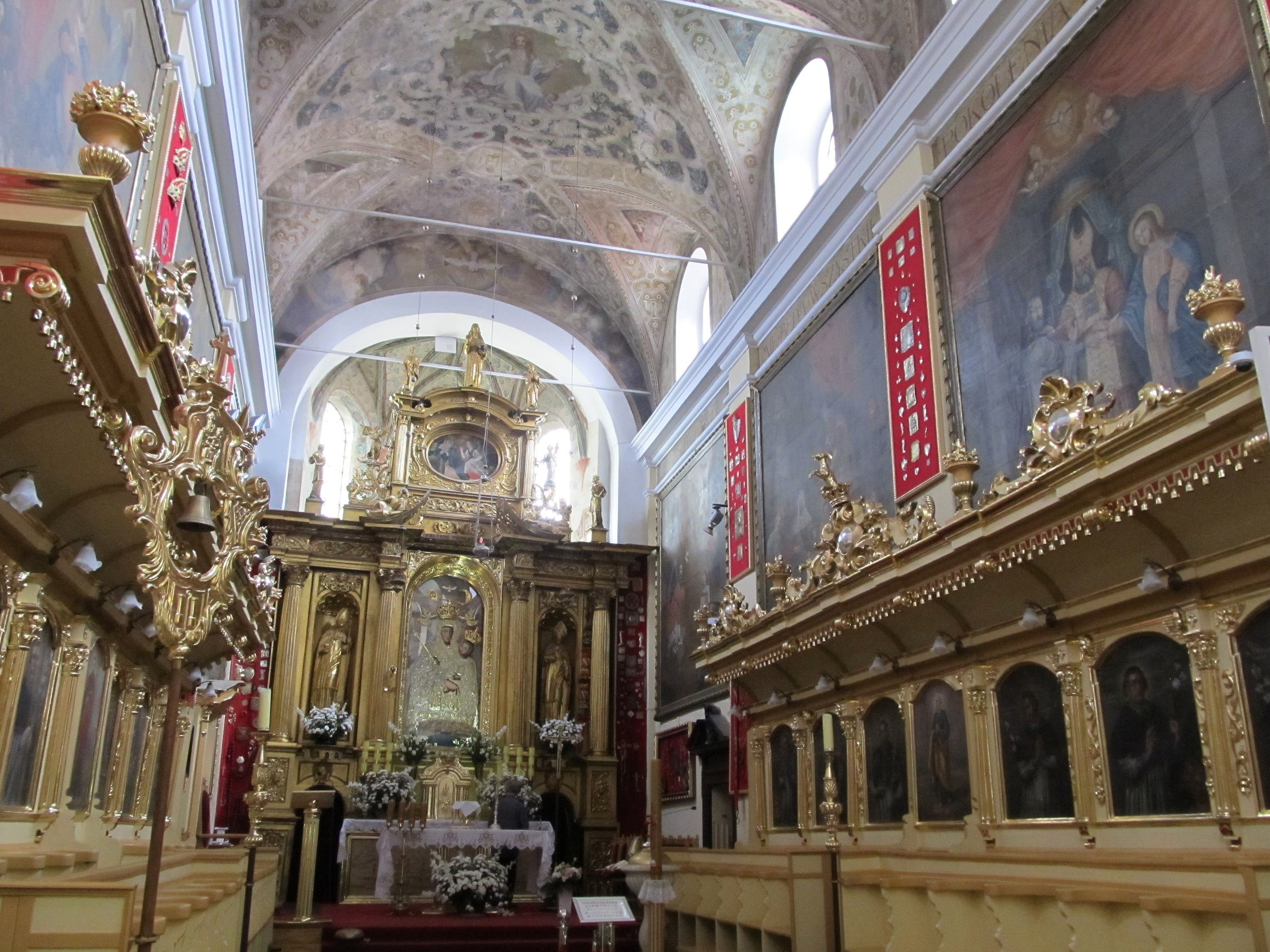
Interior of the Abbey Church

Czerwińsk is home to a large medieval monastery with the Romanesque Abbey Church, founded in the 12th century, which is listed as a Historic Monument of Poland as one of the most precious heritage sites of its kind in the country. The oldest known mention of the village comes from a bull of Pope Adrian IV from 1155. Czerwińsk was a major center of culture and commerce in the Middle Ages. Following the fragmentation of Poland, it formed part of the Duchy of Masovia, a provincial duchy of Poland. In 1410, during the Polish–Lithuanian–Teutonic War, the Polish army of King Władysław II Jagiełło crossed the Vistula River nearby to join the Lithuanian army before the Battle of Grunwald. In 1419, an alliance between Poland and the Kalmar Union was formed in the town. It was reincorporated directly into the Kingdom of Poland in 1526 after the extinction of the Masovian line of the Piast dynasty. Afterwards, it was administratively located in the Ciechanów Land in the Masovian Voivodeship in the Greater Poland Province.

During the German occupation of Poland (World War II), in 1940, the German gendarmerie carried out expulsions of Poles, who were afterwards deported to forced labour, while their houses and farms were handed over to German colonists as part of the Lebensraum policy.
