= Osiek, Gmina Czerwińsk nad Wisłą =

Osiek
- Village
- Location within Poland
- Coordinates: 52°27′27″N 20°16′20″E
- Country: Poland
- Voivodeship: Masovian
- County: Płońsk
- Gmina: Czerwińsk nad Wisłą

Osiek [ˈɔɕɛk] is a village in the administrative district of Gmina Czerwińsk nad Wisłą, within Płońsk County, Masovian Voivodeship, in east-central Poland.
