= Miączynek, Masovian Voivodeship =

Miączynek
- Village
- Location within Poland
- Coordinates: 52°25′N 20°27′E
- Country: Poland
- Voivodeship: Masovian
- County: Płońsk
- Gmina: Czerwińsk nad Wisłą

Miączynek [mjɔnˈt͡ʂɨnɛk] is a village in the administrative district of Gmina Czerwińsk nad Wisłą, within Płońsk County, Masovian Voivodeship, in east-central Poland.
