= Kuchary-Skotniki =

- Village
- Location within Poland
- Coordinates: 52°27′00″N 20°22′00″E
- Country: Poland
- Voivodeship: Masovian
- County: Płońsk
- Gmina: Czerwińsk nad Wisłą

Kuchary-Skotniki [kuˈxarɨ skɔtˈniki] is a village in the administrative district of Gmina Czerwińsk nad Wisłą, within Płońsk County, Masovian Voivodeship, in east-central Poland.
