= Raszewo Włościańskie =

- Village
- Location within Poland
- Coordinates: 52°27′33″N 20°14′35″E
- Country: Poland
- Voivodeship: Masovian
- County: Płońsk
- Gmina: Czerwińsk nad Wisłą

Raszewo Włościańskie (Polish pronunciation: [raˈʂɛvɔ vwɔɕˈtɕaj̃skʲɛ]) is a village in the administrative district of Gmina Czerwińsk nad Wisłą, within Płońsk County, Masovian Voivodeship, in east-central Poland.
