= Roguszyn, Płońsk County =

Roguszyn
- Village
- Location within Poland
- Coordinates: 52°26′11″N 20°23′45″E
- Country: Poland
- Voivodeship: Masovian
- County: Płońsk
- Gmina: Czerwińsk nad Wisłą

Roguszyn [rɔˈɡuʂɨn] is a village in the administrative district of Gmina Czerwińsk nad Wisłą, within Płońsk County, Masovian Voivodeship, in east-central Poland.
