= Wychódźc =

- Village
- Location within Poland
- Coordinates: 52°23′57″N 20°25′6″E
- Country: Poland
- Voivodeship: Masovian
- County: Płońsk
- Gmina: Czerwińsk nad Wisłą
- Population: 340

Wychódźc [ˈvɨxut͡ɕt͡s] is a village in the administrative district of Gmina Czerwińsk nad Wisłą, within Płońsk County, Masovian Voivodeship, in east-central Poland.
