= Chociszewo, Masovian Voivodeship =

Chociszewo
- Village
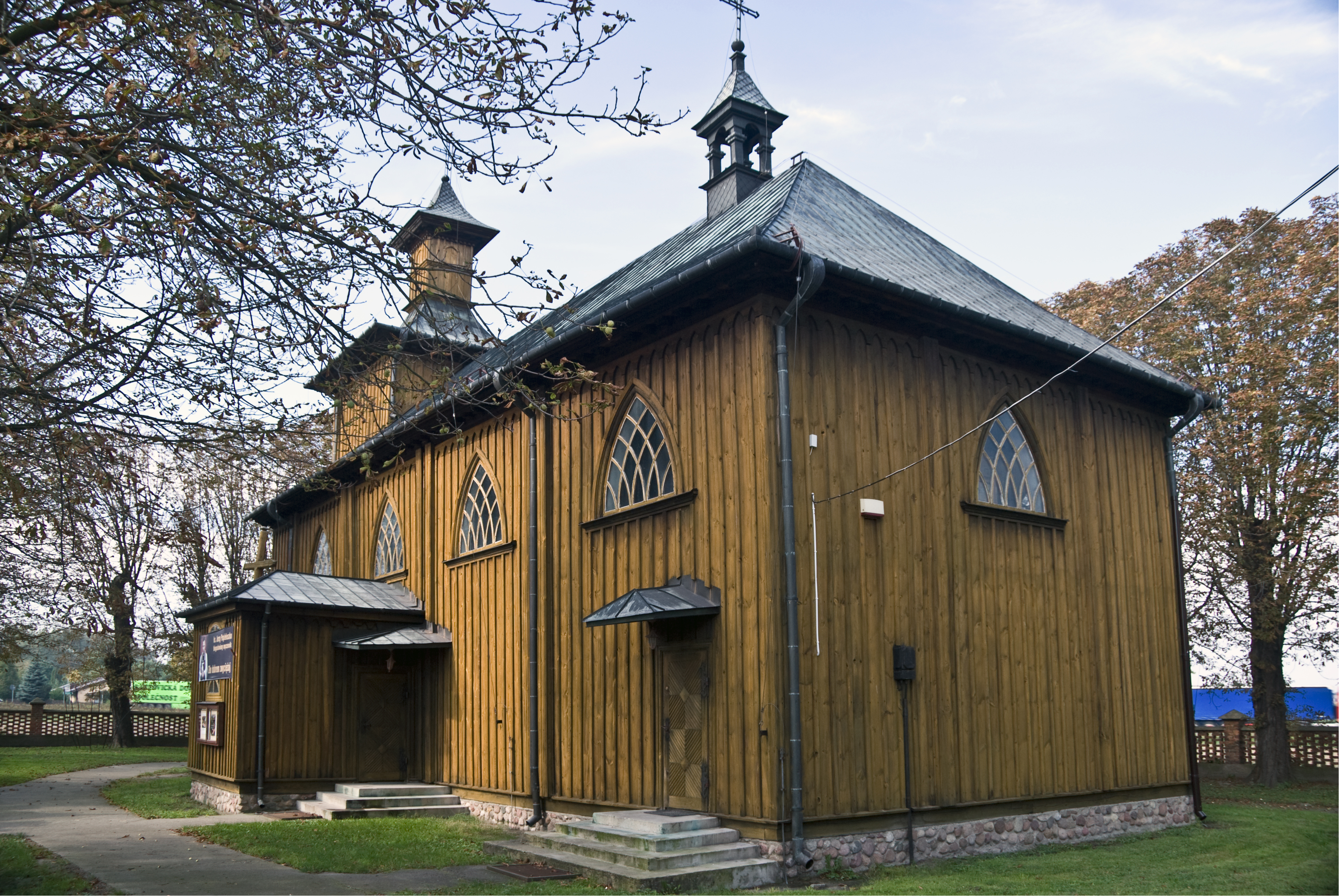
- Saint Leonard church in Chociszewo

- Location within Poland
- Coordinates: 52°25′N 20°23′E
- Country: Poland
- Voivodeship: Masovian
- County: Płońsk
- Gmina: Czerwińsk nad Wisłą

Chociszewo [xɔt͡ɕiˈʂɛvɔ] is a village in the administrative district of Gmina Czerwińsk nad Wisłą, within Płońsk County, Masovian Voivodeship, in east-central Poland.
