= Stare Przybojewo =

- Village
- Location within Poland
- Coordinates: 52°26′09″N 20°23′24″E
- Country: Poland
- Voivodeship: Masovian
- County: Płońsk
- Gmina: Czerwińsk nad Wisłą

Stare Przybojewo [ˈstarɛ pʂɨbɔˈjɛvɔ] is a village in the administrative district of Gmina Czerwińsk nad Wisłą, within Płońsk County, Masovian Voivodeship, in east-central Poland.
