= Stanisław Noakowski =

Polish painter and architect (1867–1928)

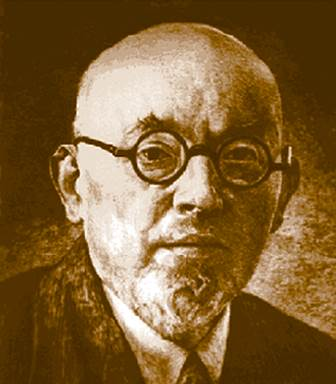
Self-portrait (date unknown)

Stanisław Noakowski (21 March 1867, Nieszawa – 1 October 1928, Warsaw) was a Polish architect, watercolorist and art historian. His work was part of the painting event in the art competition at the 1928 Summer Olympics.

== Biography ==
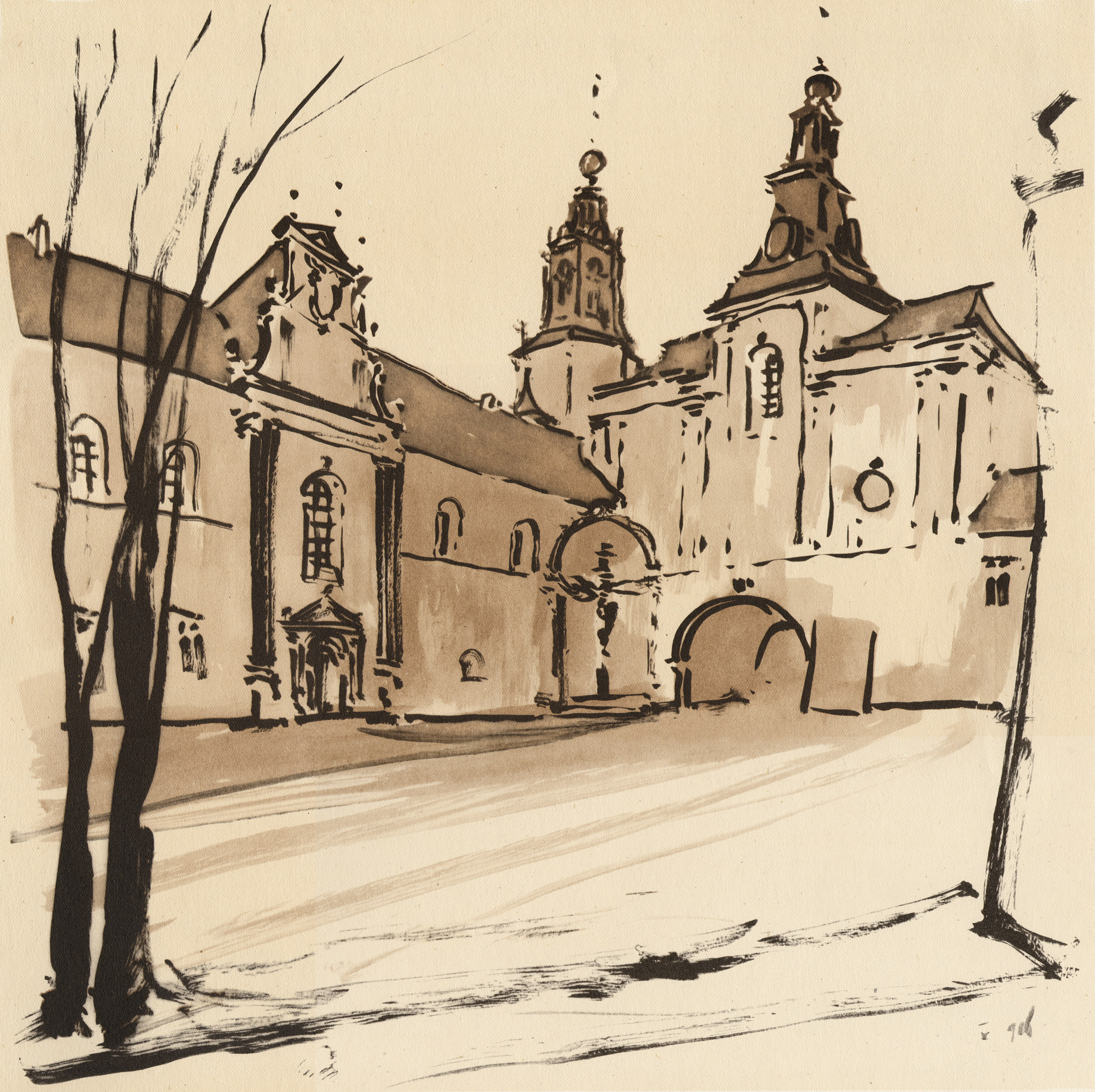
Polish Baroque architecture

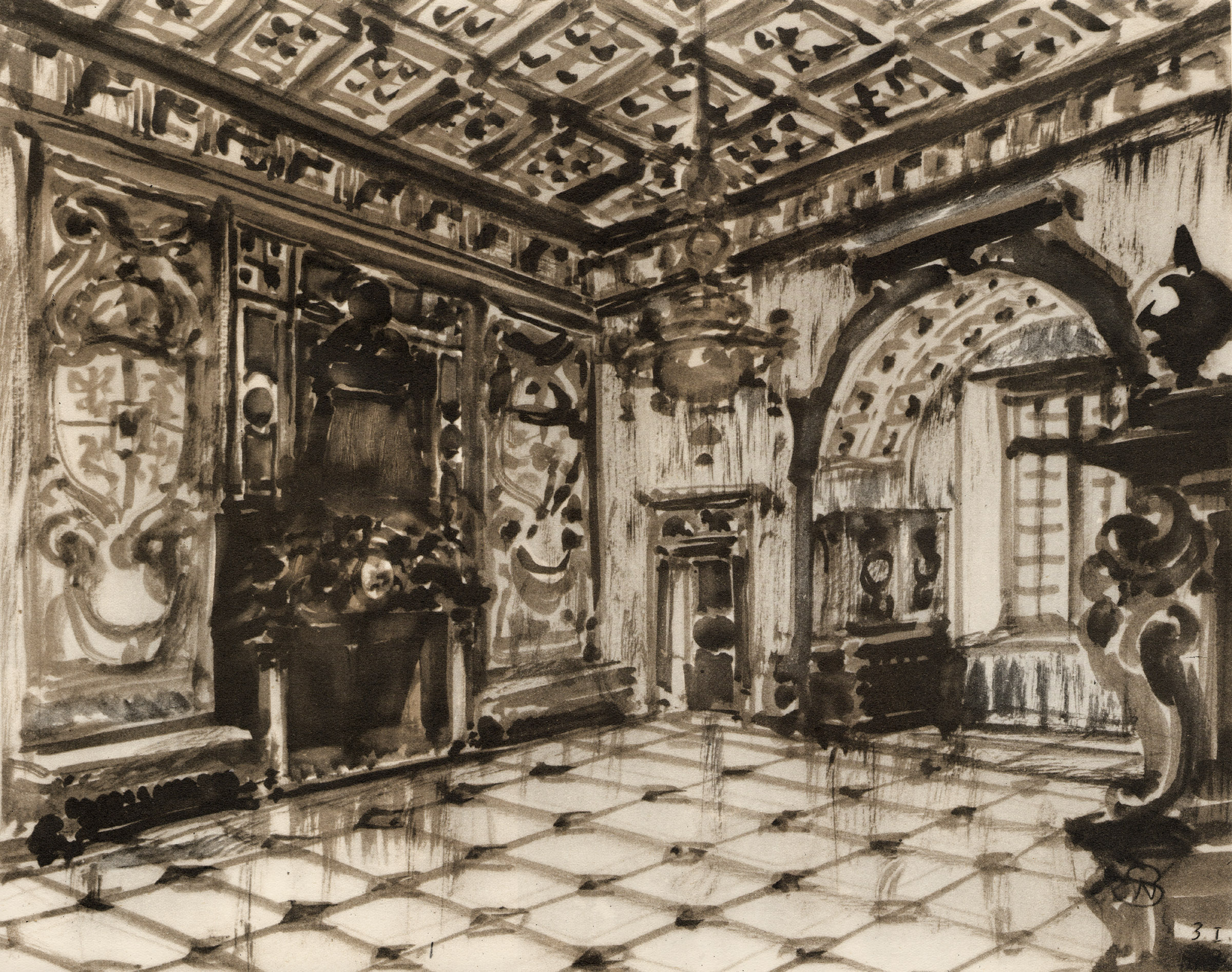
The interior of Wawel Castle

His father was a civil law notary and translator. His first art studies were at the Realschule in Włocławek from 1877 to 1884, with the painter and critic, Ludwik Bouchard. From 1884 to 1886, he attended the gymnasium in Łowicz, then studied architecture at the Academy of Fine Arts in Saint Petersburg. Upon graduating in 1895, he was awarded a stipend that enabled him to continue his studies

Upon returning, he failed to obtain a position at the Warsaw University of Technology and went to Russia to teach at the Stroganov School for Technical Drawing, where he was appointed curator of its museum in 1899. He was also associated with a group of young Russian artists organized around the magazine Mir iskusstva. In 1906, he was named a professor at the Moscow School of Painting, Sculpture and Architecture. In 1915, he became a member of the academy. After World War I, he was appointed to the Moscow College of Arts, a division of the Ministry of Education.

In 1919, after the establishment of the Second Polish Republic, he was able to return to Warsaw and begin teaching at the University of Technology. From 1920 to 1923, he served as dean of the Faculty of Architecture. That year, he became a professor at the Warsaw Academy of Fine Arts.

He received the Order of Saint Stanislaus in 1907, the Order of Polonia Restituta in 1923 and the Prime Minister's Award in 1926. In 1934, the house in Nieszawa where his family lived from 1868 to 1877 was turned into a museum. Streets have been named after him in Bydgoszcz, Gdańsk, Gliwice, Józefów, Ostrów Mazowiecka, Piastów, Szczecin, Włocławek and Wrocław.

Largely known for his watercolor sketches of notable buildings, he also worked in ink and completed thousands of drawings. Among his architectural projects, the most interesting involve designs for the chapel at the Polish Museum, Rapperswil, which contained an urn with Tadeusz Kościuszko's heart (now at the Royal Castle, Warsaw); and bishoprical tombs at the Cathedral of the Assumption in Włocławek. He also participated in a project to reconstruct the hallways at Belvedere Palace.

== Selected books ==
- Architektura Polska. Szkice kompozycyjne, Warsaw, 1920
- Pisma (Drawings), Wydawnictwo Budownictwo i Architektura, Warsaw, 1957
