= Ludwik Bouchard =

Polish painter (1828–1912)

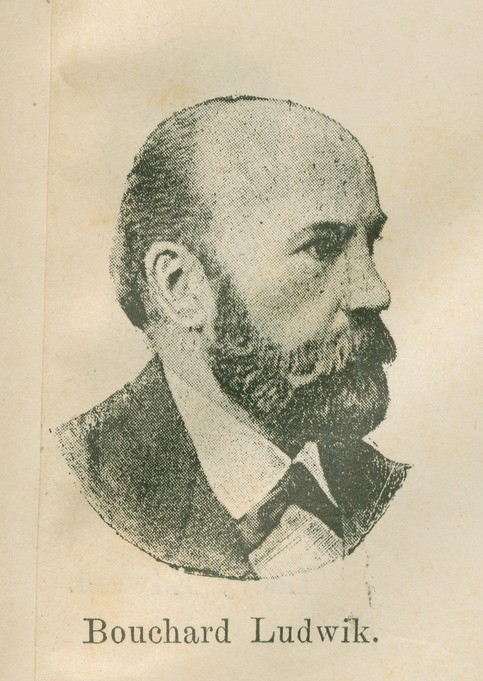
Portrait from Kłosy (1890)

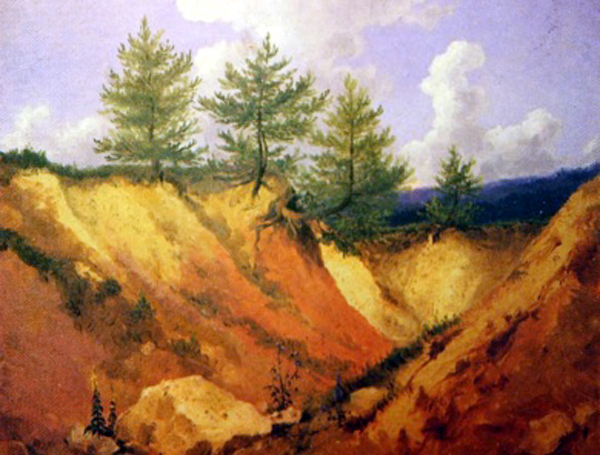
Landscape with Three Spruce Trees

Ludwik Aleksander Buszard, known as Ludwik Bouchard (1828 – 1 February 1912) was a Polish painter and art teacher of French ancestry.

== Biography ==
He was born in Warsaw to Louis Bouchard, a former officer in the Napoleonic army, and his wife, Elisabeth née Coterelle. After graduating from secondary school, he began to study painting. His first teacher was Aleksander Kokular, who died in 1846. This was followed by studies with Bonawentura Dąbrowski and Jan Feliks Piwarski. From 1855, he belonged to a group of artists associated with Wojciech Gerson.

In 1857, he was appointed a drawing teacher at the Church of the Nativity of the Blessed Virgin Mary. During this time, he also travelled with his fellow artist, painting landscapes. He held his first two exhibitions in 1858. The following year, he started writing a column on art for Tygodnik Ilustrowany, and made irregular contributions to several other similar magazines. Occasionally, he wrote on architecture.

He was transferred to Włocławek in 1862. One of his students there was Stanisław Noakowski, who credits him with the inspiration to become a professional painter. However, due in part to his heavy work schedule, and being cut off from the cultural life of Warsaw, his own artistic output diminished greatly. Over time, he chose to accept commissions for religious works rather than paint landscapes.

His isolation increased after the January Uprising, when several of his friends left to join the new government. In 1868, he stopped contributing to periodicals. Luckily, in the early 1870s, a faience factory was established nearby. He soon became interested in ceramics, and began providing designs for vases, tiles and ornaments. Some of those designs may still be seen at the Museum of Kujawy and Dobrzyń.

He retired in 1892 and died twenty years later, aged eighty-four, in Włocławek. In addition to the above museum, his works may be seen at the National Museum, Warsaw.
