= Goworowo, Płońsk County =

Goworowo
- Village
- Location within Poland
- Coordinates: 52°26′N 20°26′E
- Country: Poland
- Voivodeship: Masovian
- County: Ostrołęka
- Gmina: Czerwińsk nad Wisłą

Goworowo [ɡɔvɔˈrɔvɔ] is a village in the administrative district of Czerwińsk nad Wisłą, within Płońsk County, Masovian Voivodeship, in east-central Poland. Olympian Kazimierz Suchorzewski was born here.

== History ==
During the invasion of Poland, a member of the SS-Artillerie-Standarte and an Army Feldgendarme killed 50 Jews in the village. The local German Army commander ordered a court-martial, with the prosecutor demanding the death penalty. The charges were, however, dropped, following intense pressure from Himmler.

== Bibliography ==
- Stein, George (2002) [1966]. The Waffen-SS: Hitler's Elite Guard at War 1939–1945. Cerberus Publishing. ISBN 978-1841451008.
