= Nowy Boguszyn =

- Village
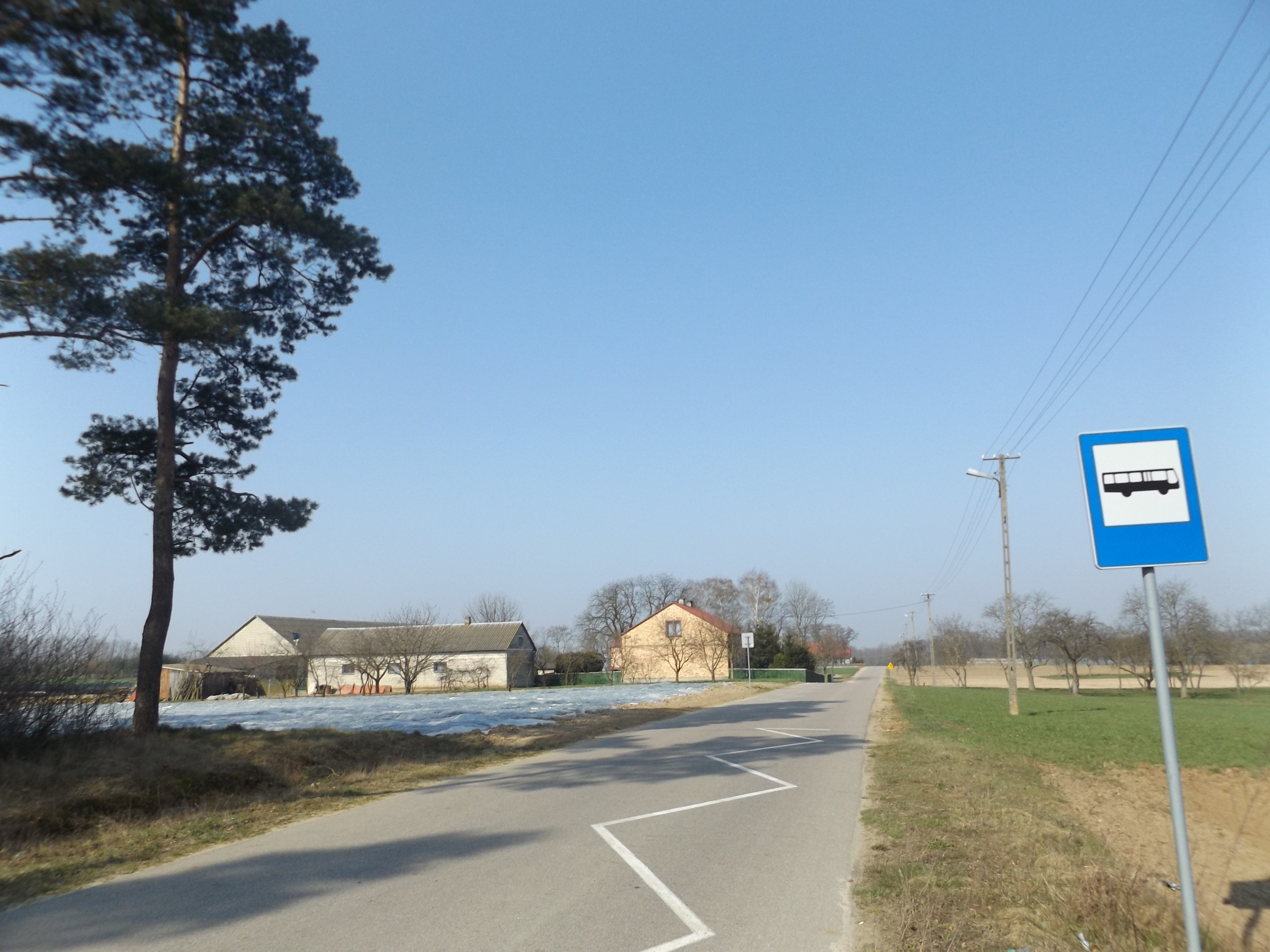

- Location within Poland
- Coordinates: 52°26′00″N 20°19′00″E
- Country: Poland
- Voivodeship: Masovian
- County: Płońsk
- Gmina: Czerwińsk nad Wisłą
- Time zone: UTC+1 (CET)
  - Summer (DST): UTC+2 (CEST)
- Vehicle registration: WPN

Nowy Boguszyn [ˈnɔvɨ bɔˈɡuʂɨn] is a village in the administrative district of Gmina Czerwińsk nad Wisłą, within Płońsk County, Masovian Voivodeship, in central Poland.

== History ==
During the German occupation of Poland (World War II), in 1940, the German gendarmerie carried out expulsions of Poles, who were afterwards deported to forced labour, while their houses and farms were handed over to German colonists as part of the Lebensraum policy.
