= Stare Radzikowo =

- Village
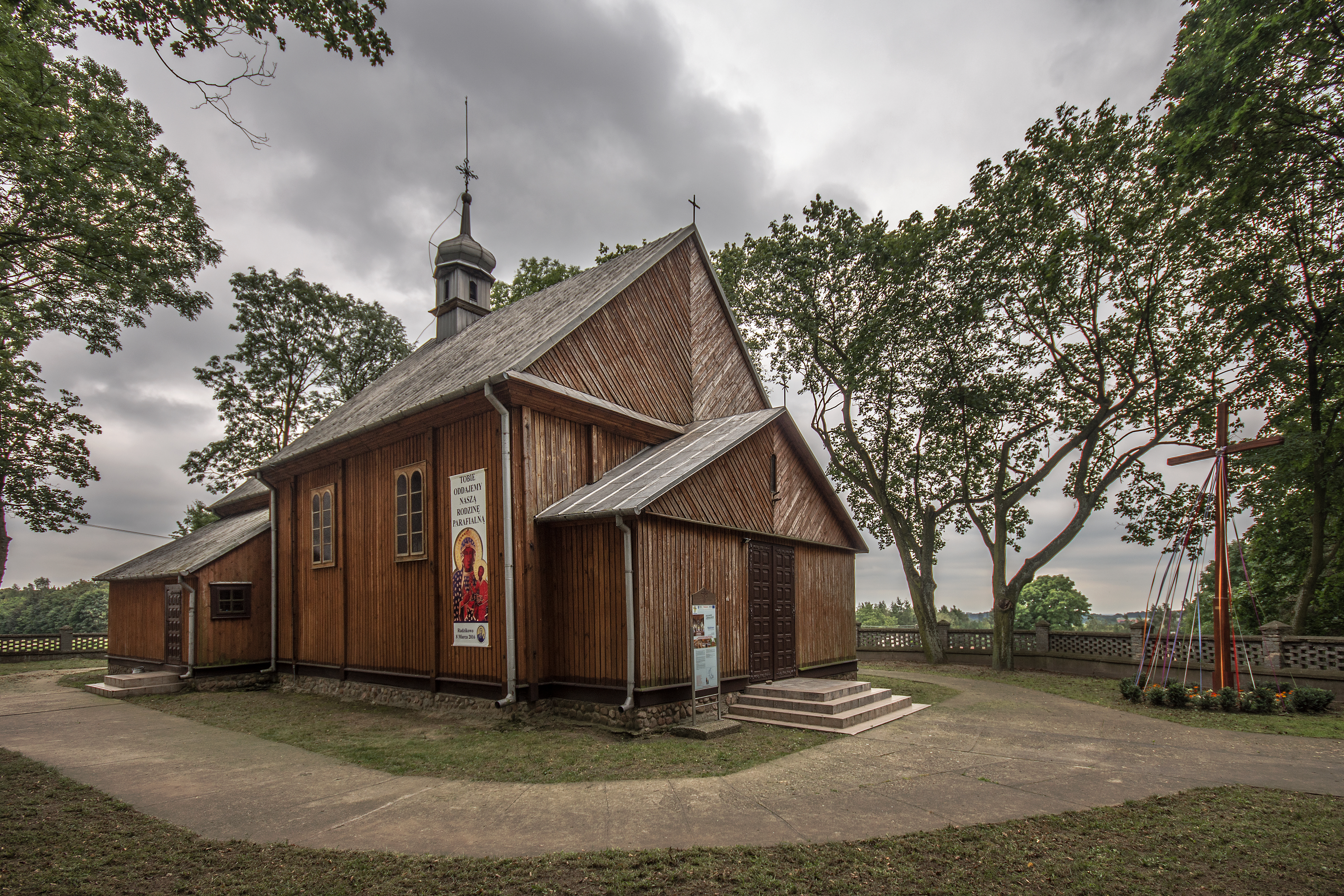
- Saint John the Baptist church in Stare Radzikowo

- Location within Poland
- Coordinates: 52°27′19″N 20°21′08″E
- Country: Poland
- Voivodeship: Masovian
- County: Płońsk
- Gmina: Czerwińsk nad Wisłą

Stare Radzikowo [ˈstarɛ rad͡ʑiˈkɔvɔ] is a village in the administrative district of Gmina Czerwińsk nad Wisłą, within Płońsk County, Masovian Voivodeship, in east-central Poland.
