= Raszewo Dworskie =

- Village
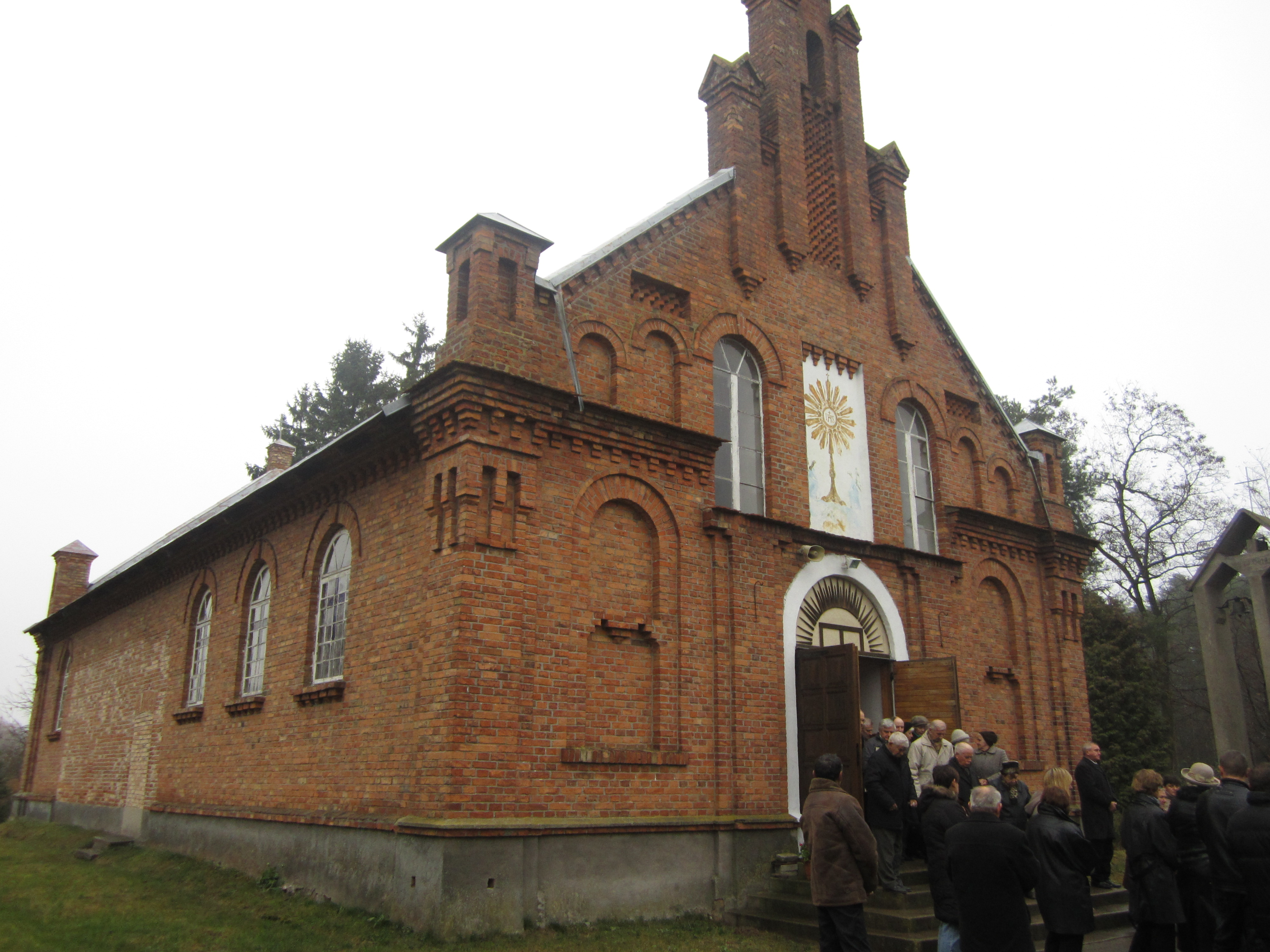
- Saint Anne Mariavite church in Raszewo Dworskie

- Location within Poland
- Coordinates: 52°27′46″N 20°15′04″E
- Country: Poland
- Voivodeship: Masovian
- County: Płońsk
- Gmina: Czerwińsk nad Wisłą
- Elevation: 116 m (381 ft)
- Population (2011): 138

Raszewo Dworskie [raˈʂɛvɔ ˈdvɔrskʲɛ] is a village in the administrative district of Gmina Czerwińsk nad Wisłą, within Płońsk County, Masovian Voivodeship, in east-central Poland.

The village was administratively part of the Płock voivodeship from 1975 to 1998.

The village was first mentioned in 1402 as belonging to the Kobylniki parish, a noble property.
