= Radzikowo Scalone =

- Village
- Location within Poland
- Coordinates: 52°27′N 20°22′E
- Country: Poland
- Voivodeship: Masovian
- County: Płońsk
- Gmina: Czerwińsk nad Wisłą

Radzikowo Scalone [rad͡ʑiˈkɔvɔ st͡saˈlɔnɛ] is a village in the administrative district of Gmina Czerwińsk nad Wisłą, within Płońsk County, Masovian Voivodeship, in east-central Poland.
