= Andrzej Nadolski =

Polish historian, archaeologist, and professor

- Born: November 26, 1921; Kraków, Republic of Poland
- Died: December 24, 1993 (aged 72); Łódź, Poland
- Education: University of Łódź

Andrzej Nadolski (26 November 1921, in Kraków – 24 December 1993, in Łódź) was a Polish historian, specializing in Polish military history, an archaeologist, and professor. During World War II he was a member of Armia Krajowa. Rector of University of Łódź from 1968 to 1969, he resigned in protest over the 1968 Polish political crisis.

== Publications ==
- Studia nad uzbrojeniem polskim w X, XI i XII wieku, 1954
- Polskie siły zbrojne w czasach Bolesława Chrobrego. Zarys strategii i taktyki, 1956
- Polska broń. Broń biała, 1974
- Broń i strój rycerstwa polskiego w Średniowieczu, 1979
- Plemięta – średniowieczny gródek w Ziemi Chełmińskiej
- Polska technika wojskowa do 1500 roku
