= Nieszawa =

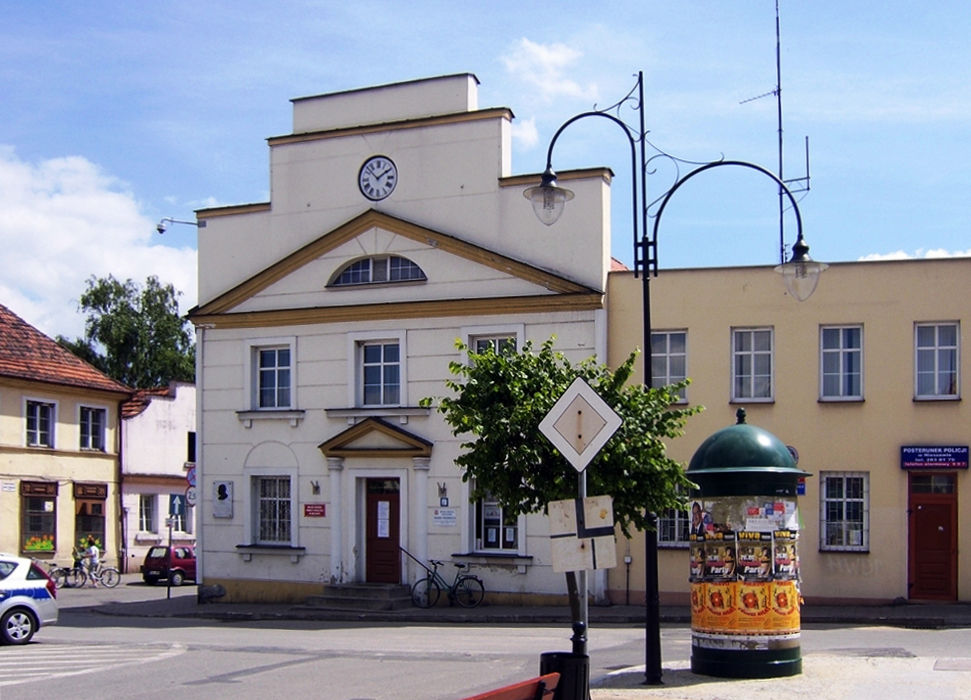
- Town Hall on Market Square

- Coat of arms

- Location within Poland
- Coordinates: 52°50′12″N 18°54′05″E
- Country: Poland
- Voivodeship: Kuyavian-Pomeranian
- County: Aleksandrów
- Gmina: Nieszawa (urban gmina)
- Town rights: 1460

Area
  - Total: 9.79 km^{2} (3.78 sq mi)
- Elevation: 50 m (160 ft)

Population (2014)
  - Total: 1,985
  - Density: 203/km^{2} (525/sq mi)
- Time zone: UTC+1 (CET)
  - Summer (DST): UTC+2 (CEST)
- Postal code: 87-730
- Area code: +48 54
- Car plates: CAL

Nieszawa (Polish pronunciation: [ɲɛˈʂava]) is a town and a commune in the Kuyavian-Pomeranian Voivodeship, in north-central Poland. As of June 30, 2014, the town has a population of 1,985 people. It is located in the historic region of Kuyavia.

== History ==
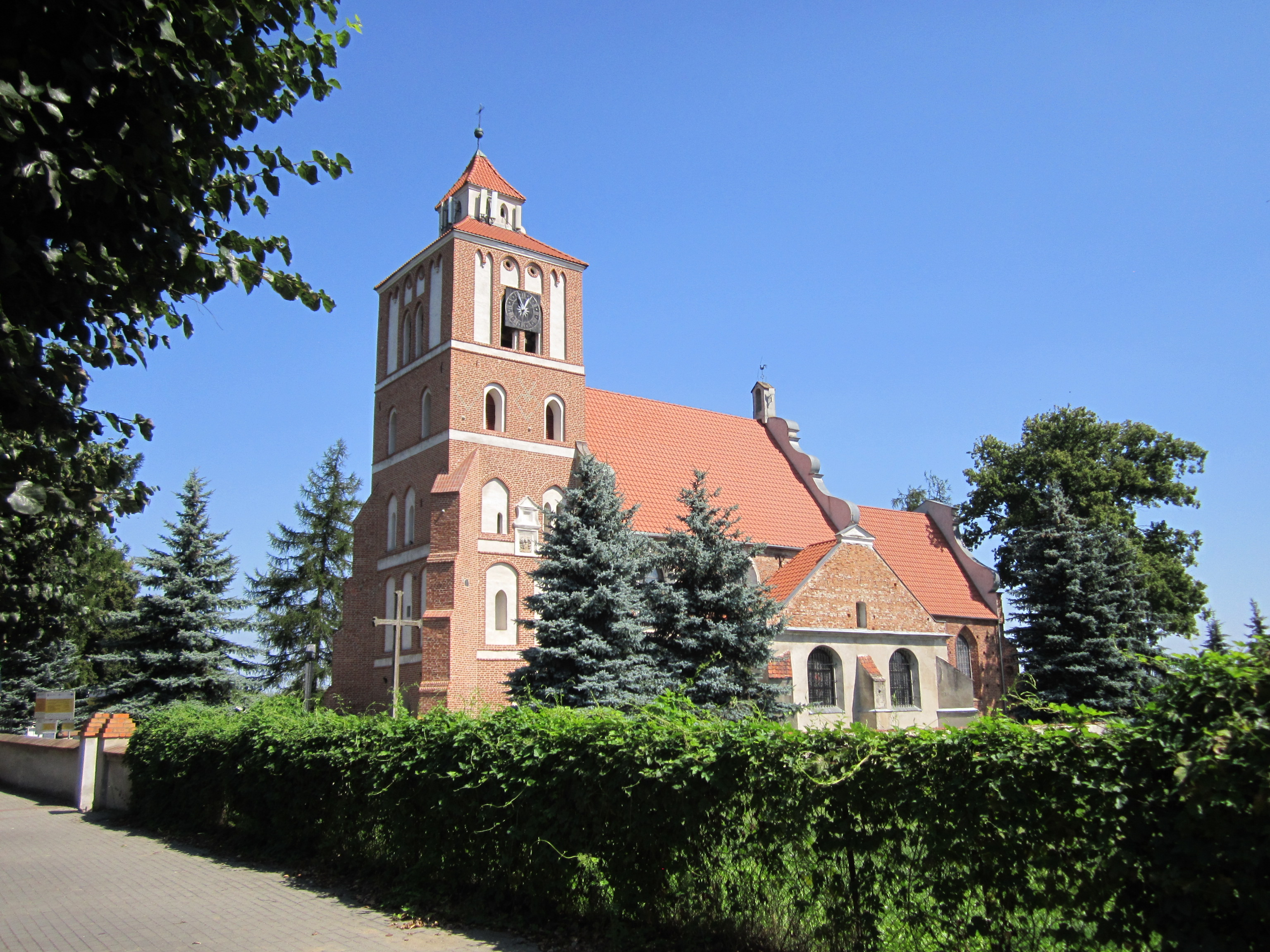
Gothic Church of Saint Hedwig, High Duchess consort of Poland

The Statutes of Nieszawa, enacted in this town at 1454, have a significance in Polish legal and social history.

Nieszawa was granted town rights in 1460. In the following centuries it was a royal town of the Kingdom of Poland, administratively located in the Brześć Kujawski County in the Brześć Kujawski Voivodeship in the Greater Poland Province.

According to the 1921 census, the town had a population of 2,381, 90.7% Polish and 7.4% Jewish.

Following the joint German-Soviet invasion of Poland, which started World War II in September 1939, the town was invaded and then occupied by Germany. The Germans immediately carried mass arrests of Poles as part of the Intelligenzaktion. Nieszawa was one of the sites of executions of Poles carried out by Germany in 1939 as part of the Intelligenzaktion. In December 1939, the Germans also expelled around 1,000 Poles from the town. Further expulsions of Poles were carried out in 1940. Houses, offices, shops and workshops of expelled Poles were handed over to Germans as part of the Lebensraum policy. In 1945 the German occupation ended and the town was restored to Poland, although with a Soviet-installed communist regime, which remained in power until the Fall of Communism in the 1980s.

== Sights ==
The most important historic landmarks and sights of the town are the Gothic Church of Saint Hedwig (High Duchess consort of Poland), built in the 15th century, which possesses rich Gothic-Renaissance-Baroque interior, the Baroque Franciscan Monastery with the Church of the Invention of the Holy Cross, the Stanisław Noakowski Museum dedicated to Polish architect and artist Stanisław Noakowski, located in his former home, and the historic market square filled with old townhouses and the town hall.

== Notable people ==
- Yisrael Barzilai (born Yisrael Eisenberg, 1913–1970), Israeli politician
- Stanisław Noakowski (1867-1928), architect, watercolorist and art historian
- Ferdynand Antoni Ossendowski (1876–1945), writer, explorer, university professor and anti-Communist activist
- Jan Woźnicki (1881-1945), teacher and parliamentarian

== Gallery ==
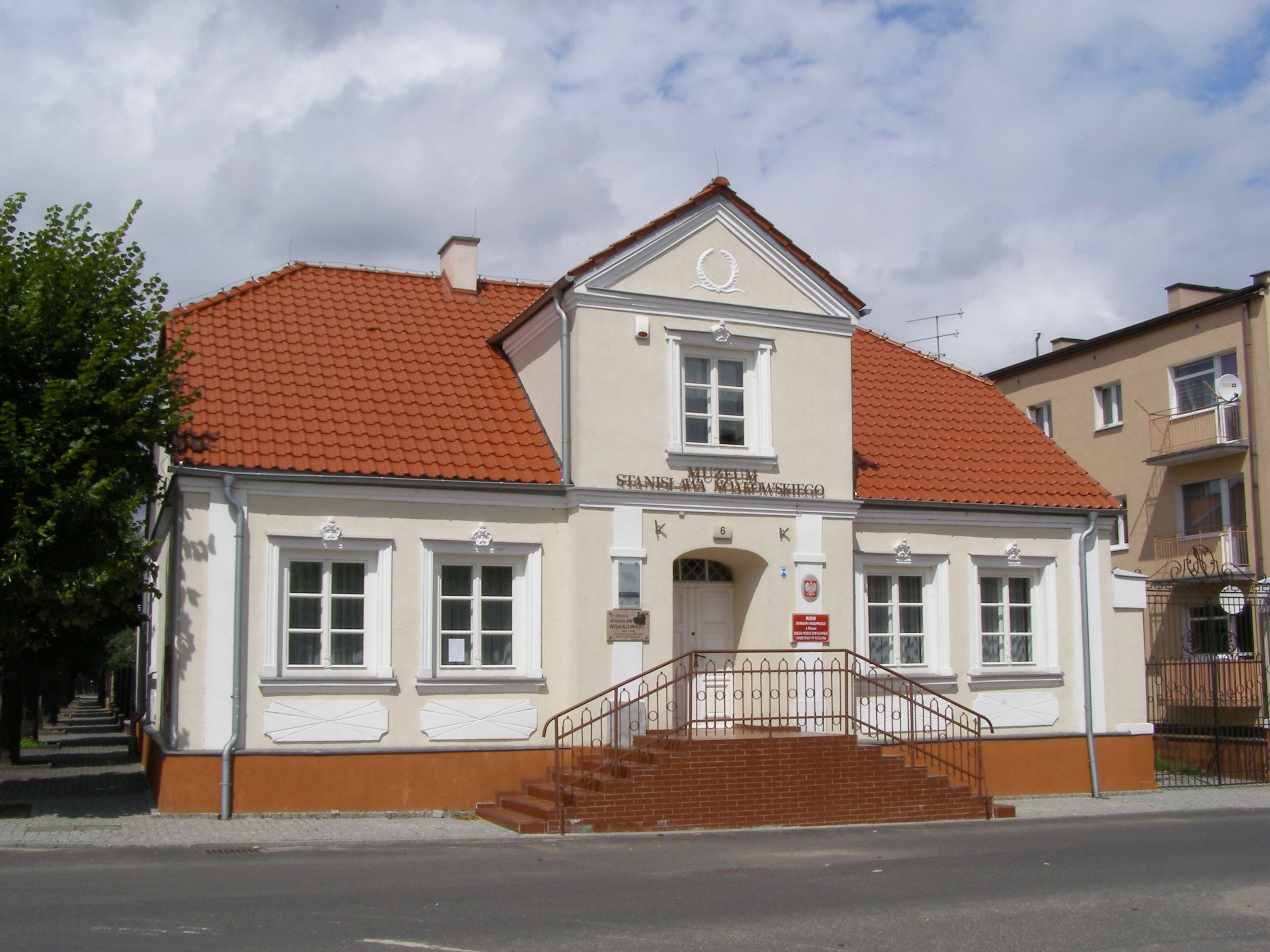
Stanisław Noakowski Museum located in his former home

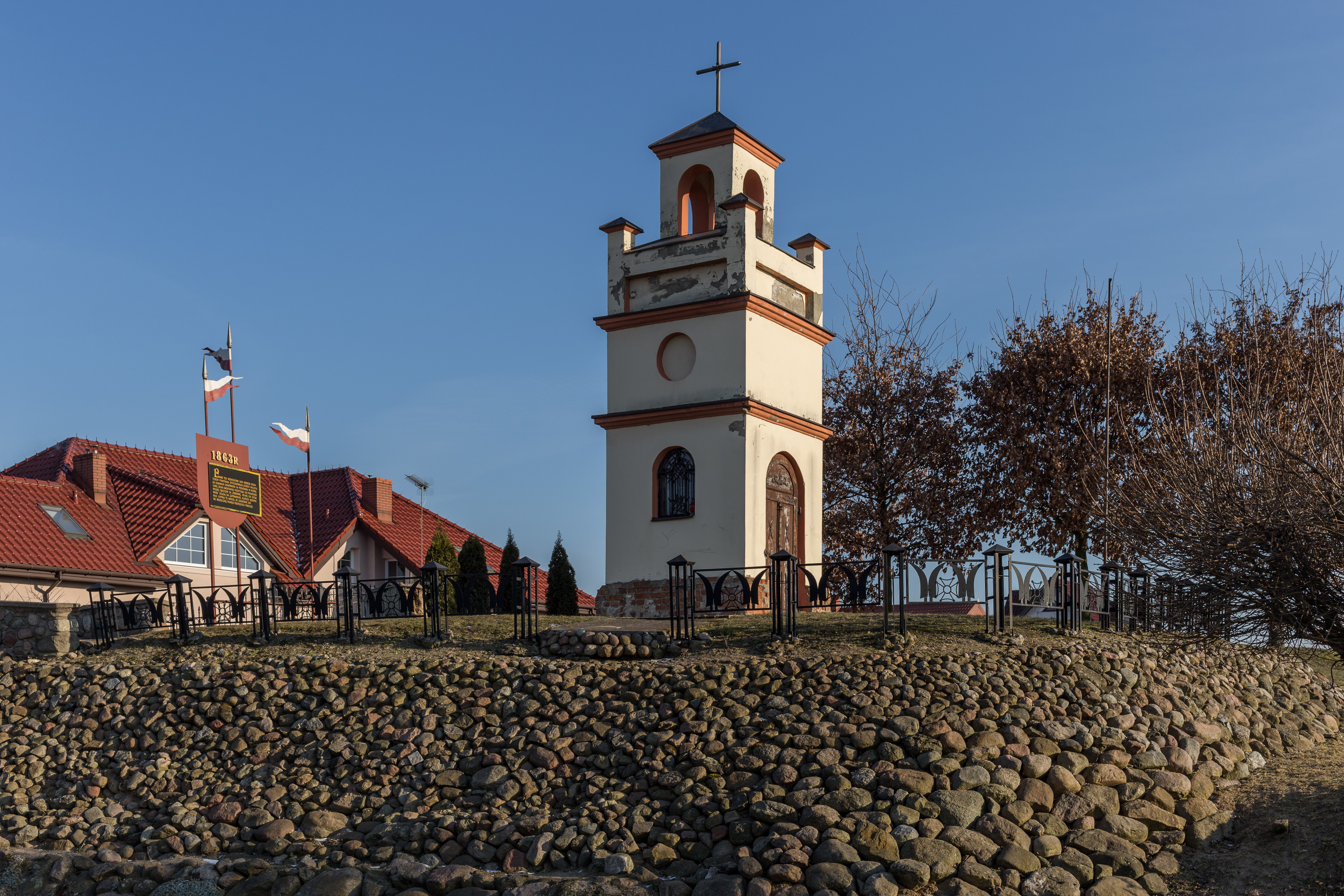
Monument to January Uprising participants

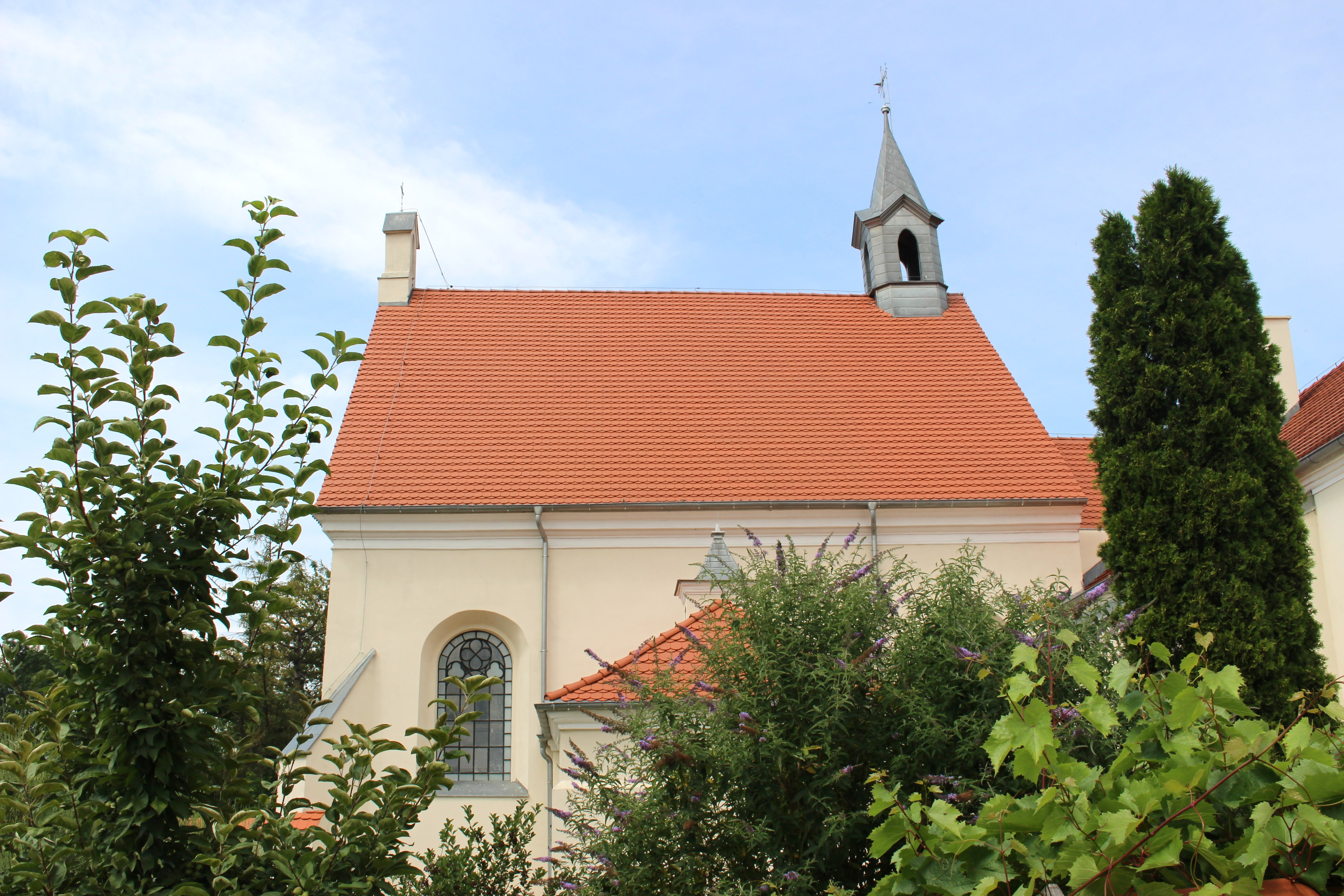
Baroque Invention of the Holy Cross church

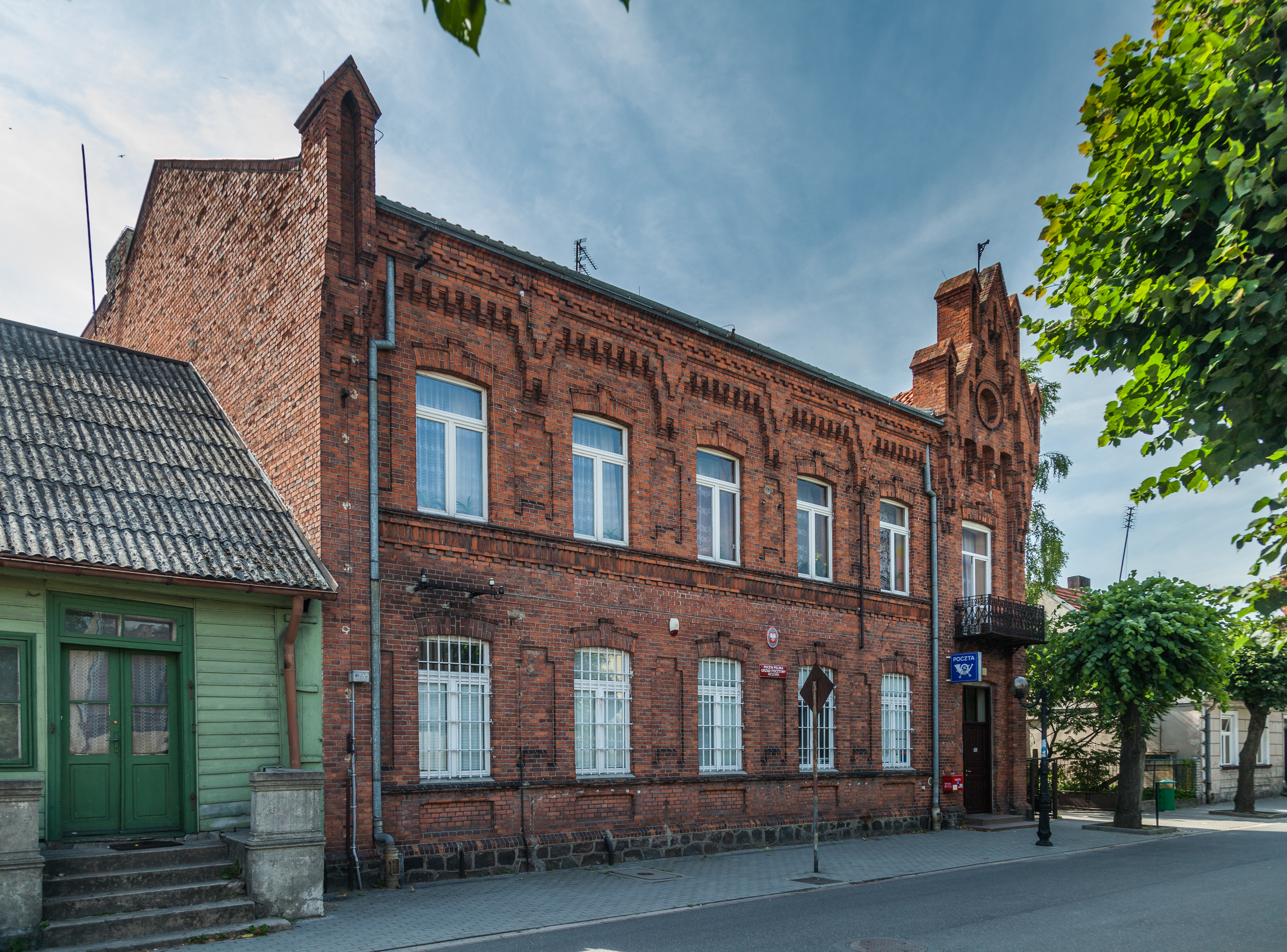
Post office
