= Przypust =

- Village
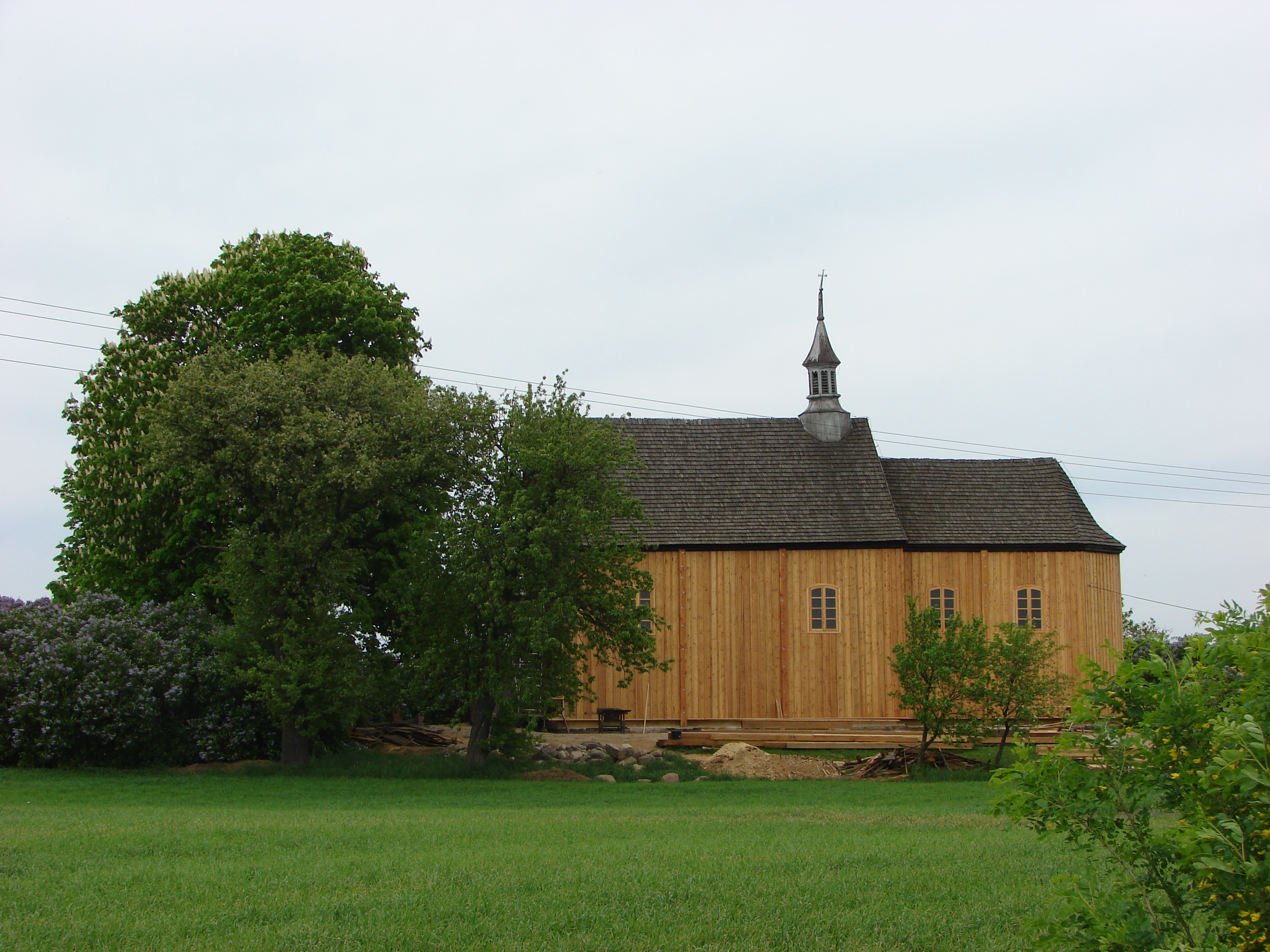
- Church of Saints Stanislaus and Mary Magdalene, 18th century

- Location within Poland
- Coordinates: 52°49′N 18°54′E
- Country: Poland
- Voivodeship: Kuyavian-Pomeranian
- County: Aleksandrów
- Gmina: Waganiec

Przypust [ˈpʂɨpust] is a village in the administrative district of Gmina Waganiec, within Aleksandrów County, Kuyavian-Pomeranian Voivodeship, in north-central Poland.

== See also ==
- List of cities and towns in Poland
