= Zdziarka =

- Village
- Location within Poland
- Coordinates: 52°24′N 20°21′E
- Country: Poland
- Voivodeship: Masovian
- County: Płońsk
- Gmina: Czerwińsk nad Wisłą

Zdziarka [ˈzd͡ʑarka] is a village in the administrative district of Gmina Czerwińsk nad Wisłą, within Płońsk County, Masovian Voivodeship, in east-central Poland.
