= Grodziec, Masovian Voivodeship =

Grodziec
- Village
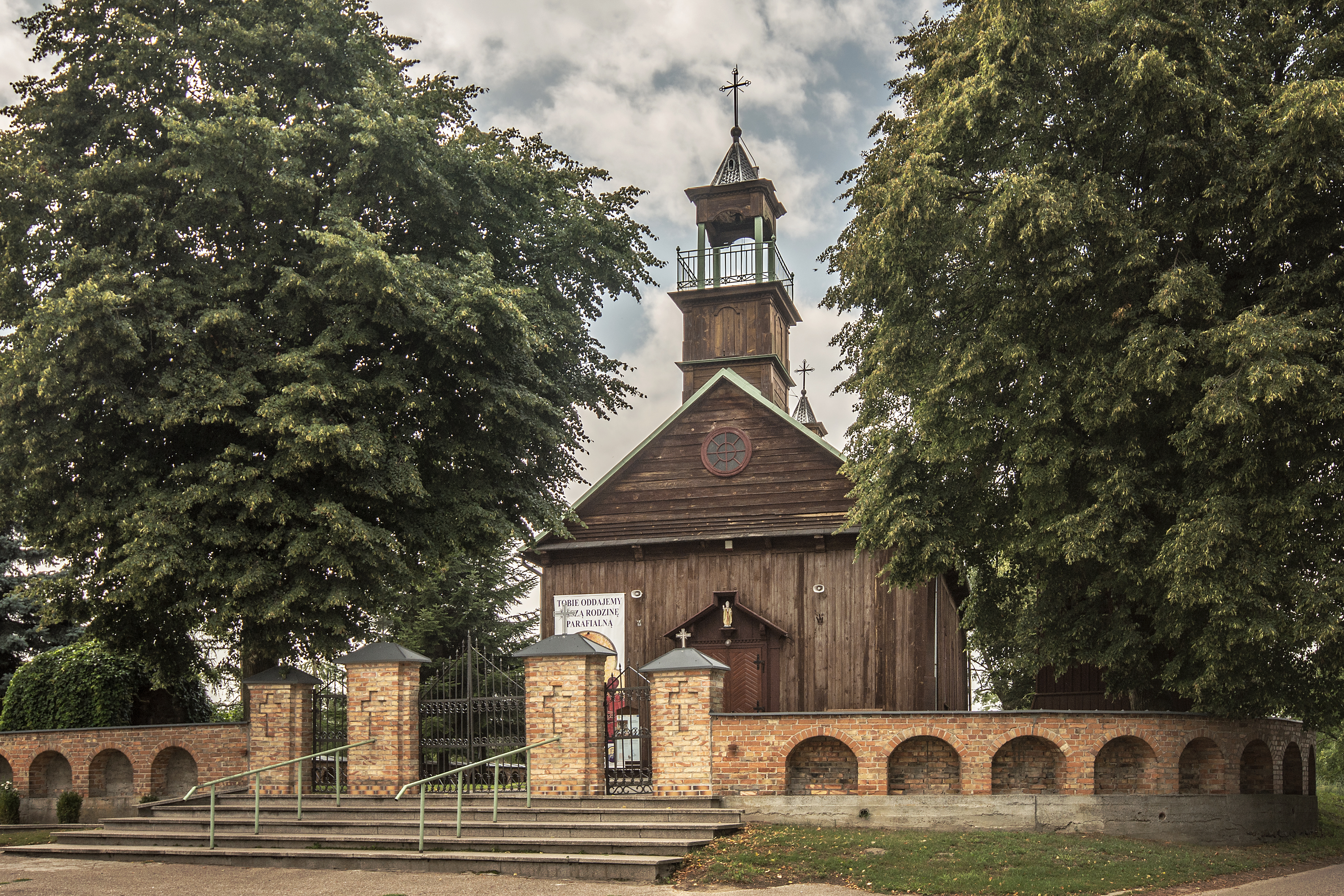
- Saint Bartholomew church in Grodziec

- Location within Poland
- Coordinates: 52°28′N 20°23′E
- Country: Poland
- Voivodeship: Masovian
- County: Płońsk
- Gmina: Czerwińsk nad Wisłą
- Population: 190

Grodziec [ˈɡrɔd͡ʑɛt͡s] is a village in the administrative district of Gmina Czerwińsk nad Wisłą, within Płońsk County, Masovian Voivodeship, in east-central Poland.
