= Podlasie =

Historical region in northeastern Poland

- Historical region
- Podlachia
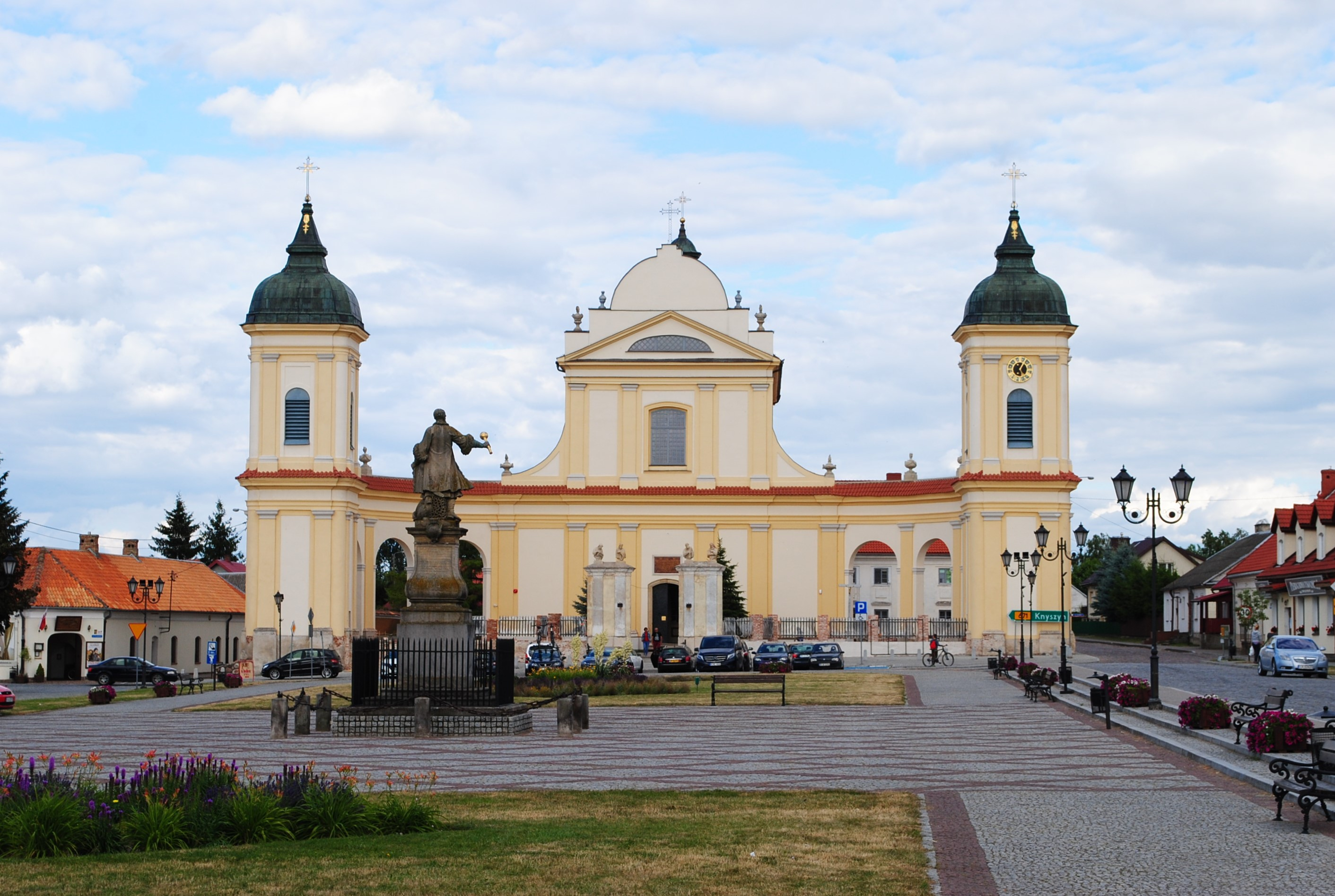
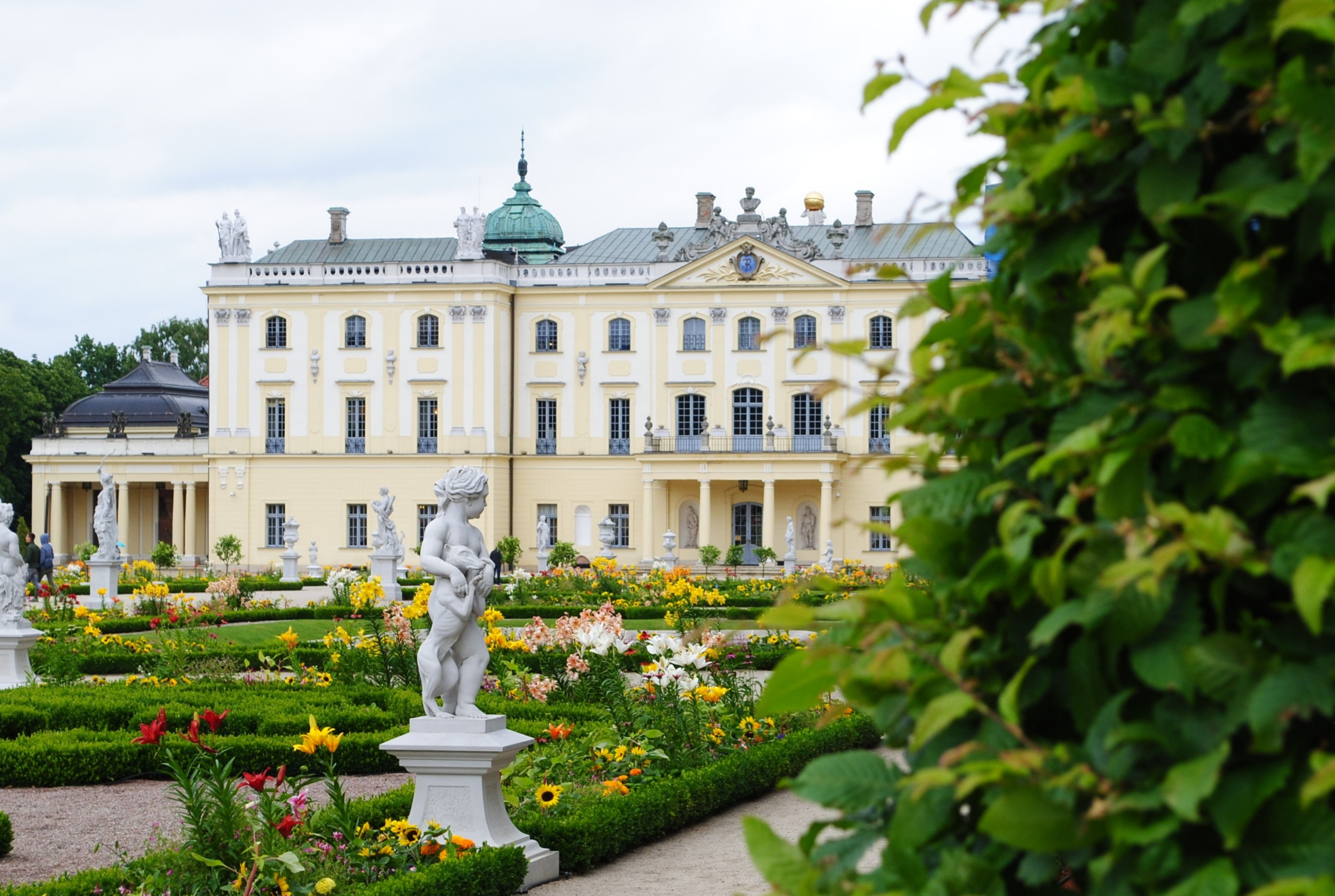
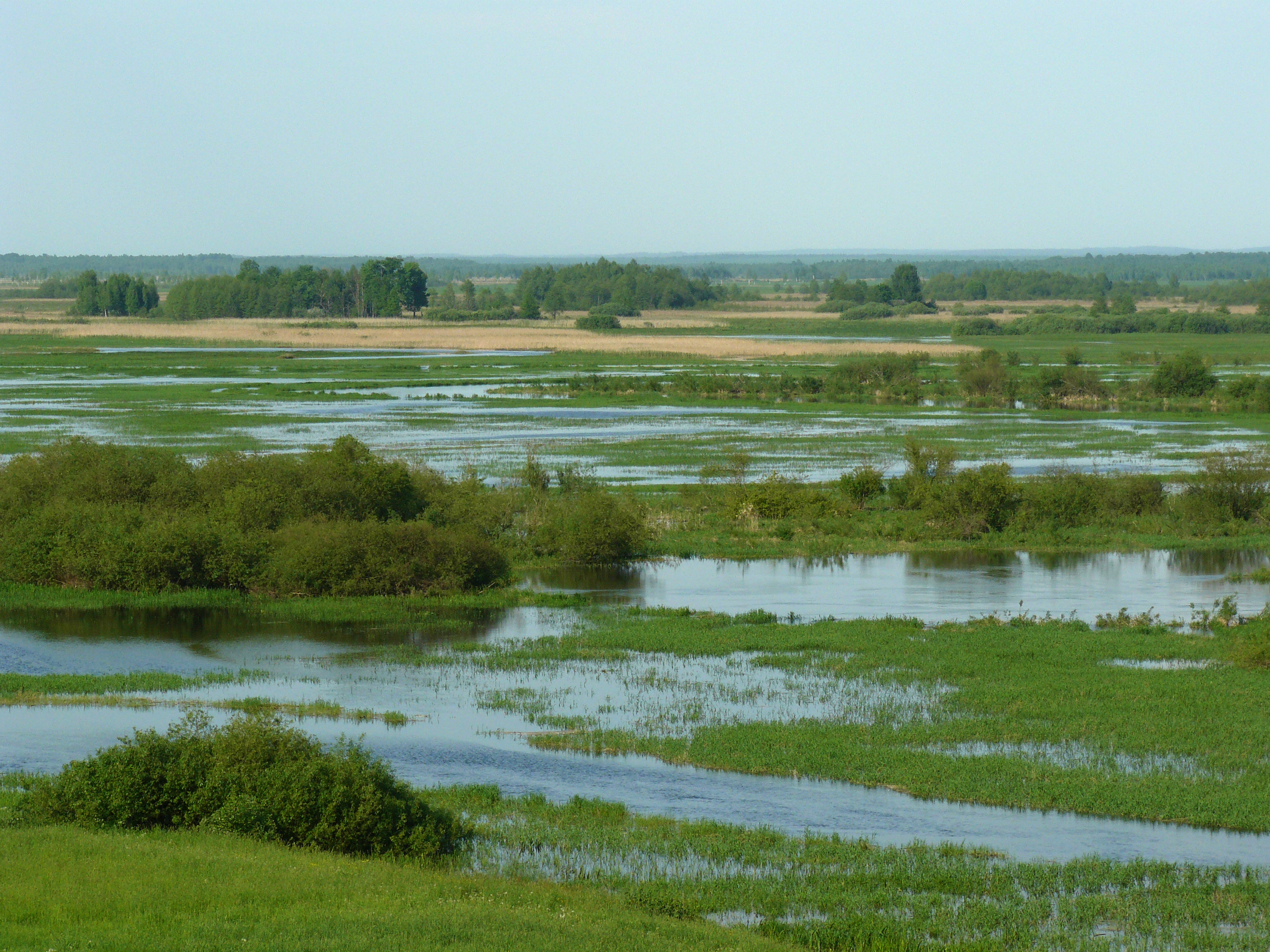
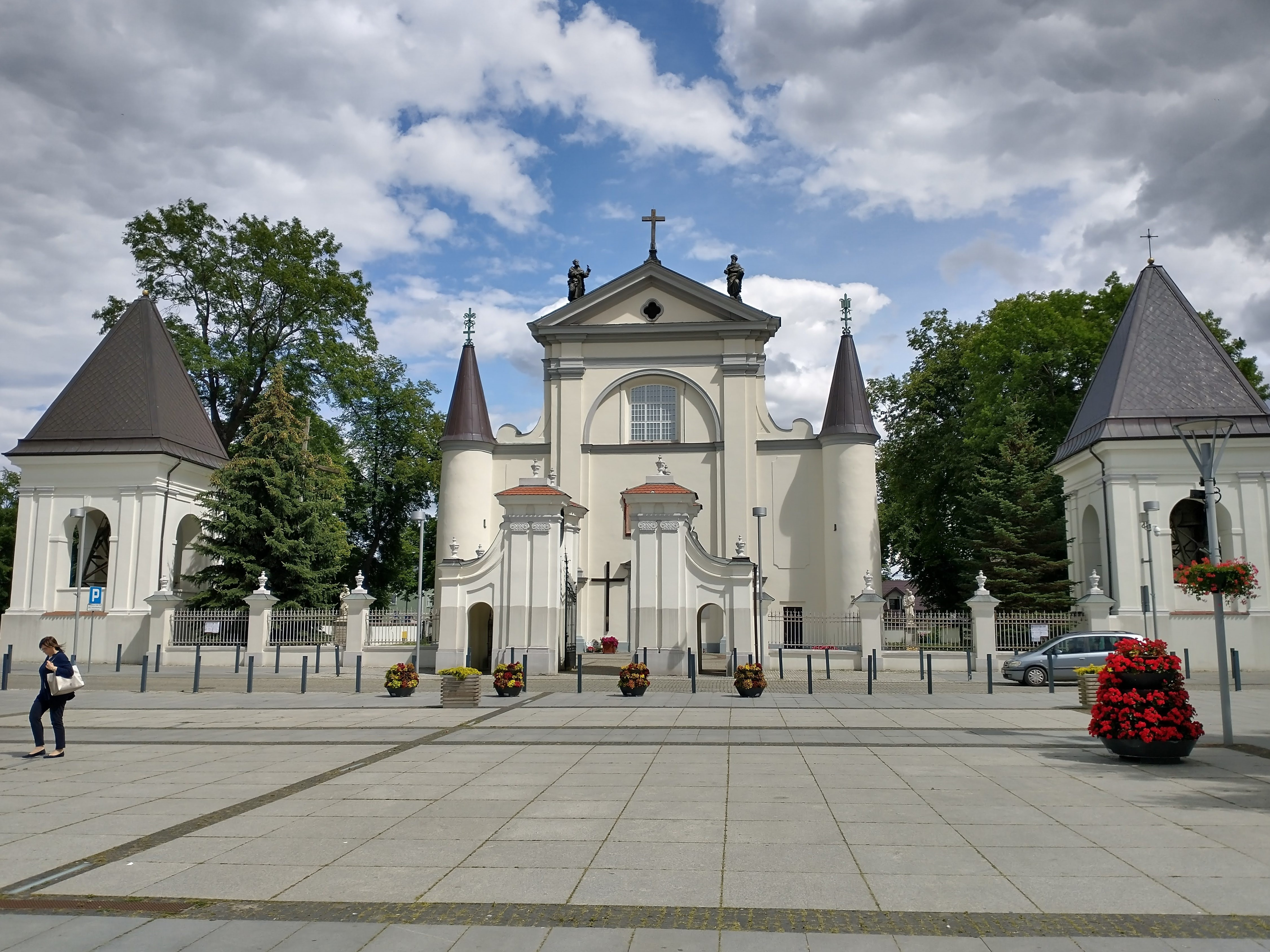
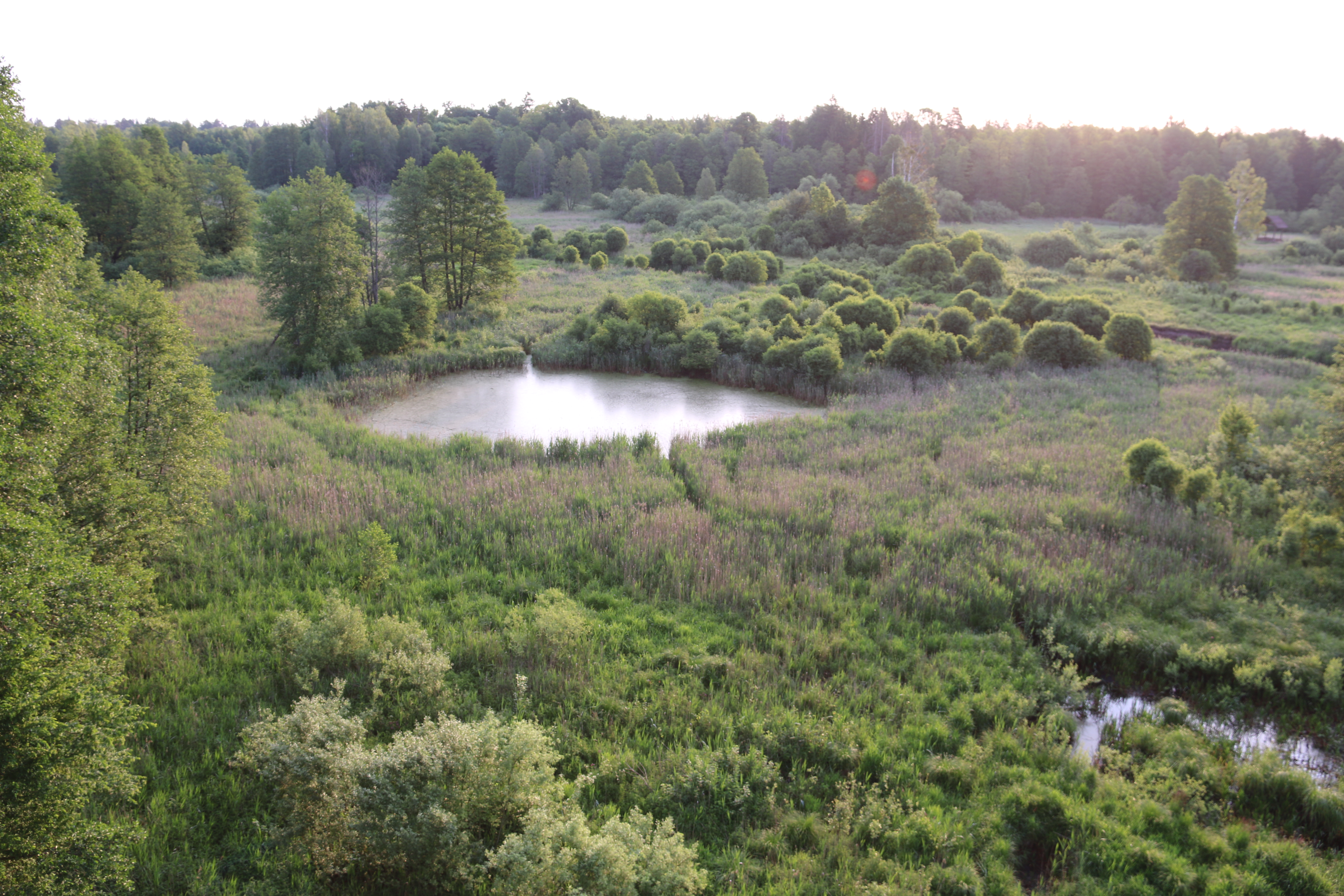
- Holy Trinity Church in Tykocin Branicki Palace in Białystok Biebrza National Park Assumption Basilica in Węgrów Białowieża National Park

- Coat of arms

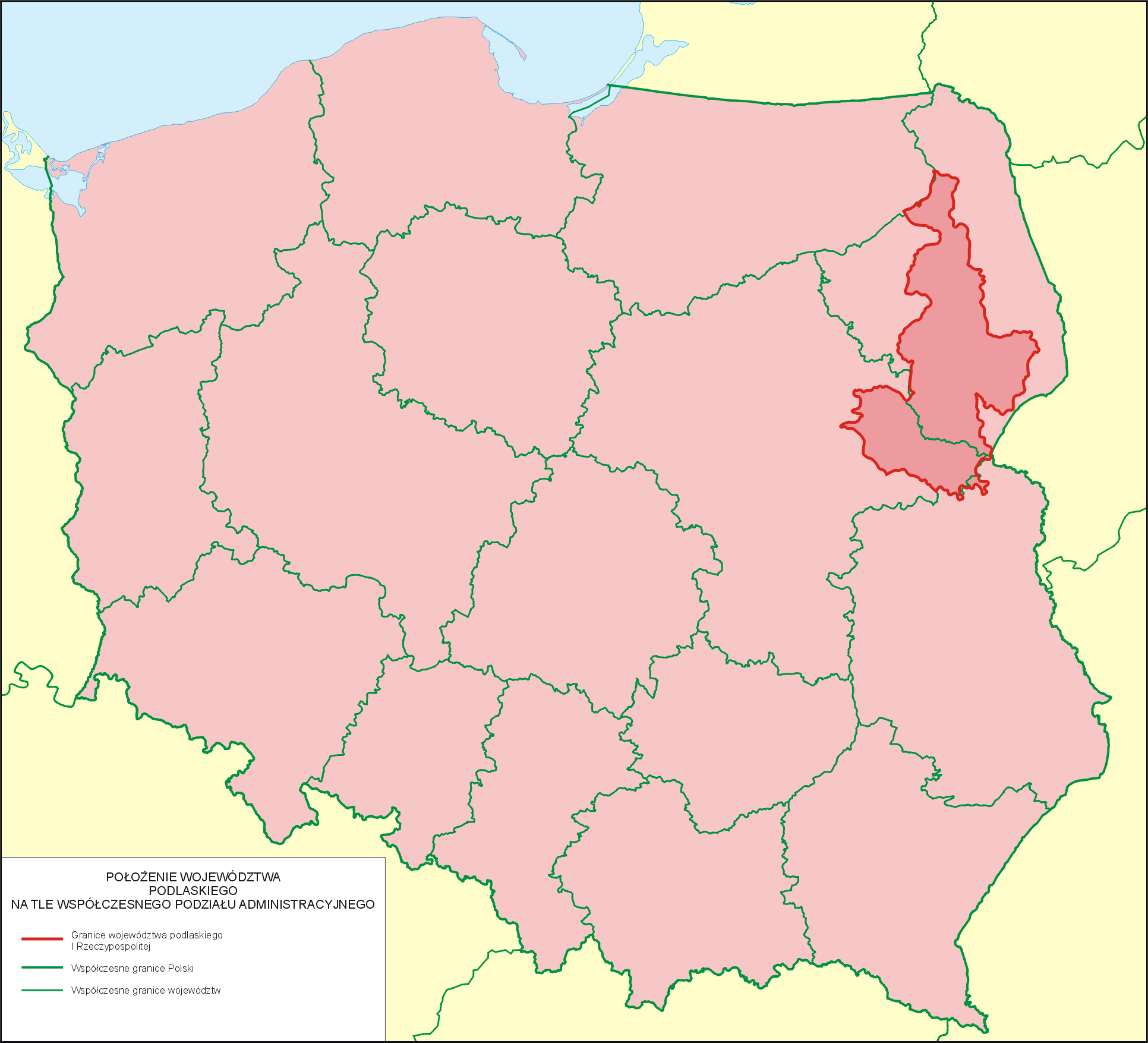
- Podlasie proper
- Country: Poland
- Former capital: Drohiczyn
- Largest city: Białystok
- Time zone: UTC+1 (CET)
  - Summer (DST): UTC+2 (CEST)

Podlasie (Polish: [pɔˈdlaɕɛ]; Belarusian: Падляшша, romanized: Padlašša; Lithuanian: Palenkė), also known as Podlachia, is a historical region in north-eastern Poland. Its largest city is Białystok, whereas the historical capital is Drohiczyn.

Similarly to several other historical regions of Poland, e.g. Greater Poland, Lesser Poland, Mazovia, Pomerania, Silesia, Warmia, Podlasie possesses its own folk costumes, unique traditional architecture and cuisine. Between 1513 and 1795 it was a voivodeship with the capital in Drohiczyn. Now the part north of the Bug River is included in the modern Podlaskie Voivodeship with the capital in Białystok, whereas southern parts are located in the Masovian and Lublin Voivodeships.

== Names and etymology ==
The region is called Podlasie, Podlasko or Podlasze in Polish, Palenkė in Lithuanian, Padliašša (Падляшша) in Belarusian, Podljas’e (Подлясье) in Russian and פּאָדליאַשע Podlyashe in Yiddish.

There are two hypotheses regarding the origin of the name of the region. According to the first one, the name is derived from the Polish word las 'forest', and means 'near the forest'. However, this hypothesis conflicts with historical phonology; it fails to explain the vocalism and especially the -ch-/-š- in Slavic languages and the -nk- in Lithuanian.

According to the second hypothesis, the name is derived from the word liakh (or lach, historically Ukrainian: лях, for 'Pole'), and means 'near Poland'. The second hypothesis holds that the term comes from the expression pod Lachem, which may be translated literally as 'under the Poles' (see: Lechia). Some claim it to mean 'under Polish rule', though in the Middle Ages Podlasie was only partially under Polish rule, and since 1446 until 1569 the area belonged to the Grand Duchy of Lithuania. A better variant of this theory holds that the name originates from the period when the territory was within the Trakai Voivodeship of the Grand Duchy of Lithuania, along the borderline with the Mazovia, primarily a fief of the Poland of the Piasts and later on part of the Kingdom of Poland of the Jagiellons. The origin of this name is apparently in East Slavic, probably Old Ruthenian ljax, as the descendants of the Proto-Slavic word *lęxъ 'Pole' are most widespread there; there is no trace of nasalisation as would be expected in a native Polish word, but instead the typically East Slavic reflex of -ja-, betraying the non-Lechitic origin.

This latter etymology accounts for names of the region in languages used outside of the region itself, including the traditional Russian Подляхия, German Podlachien, French Podlachie and Latin and Italian Podlachia.

== Geography ==
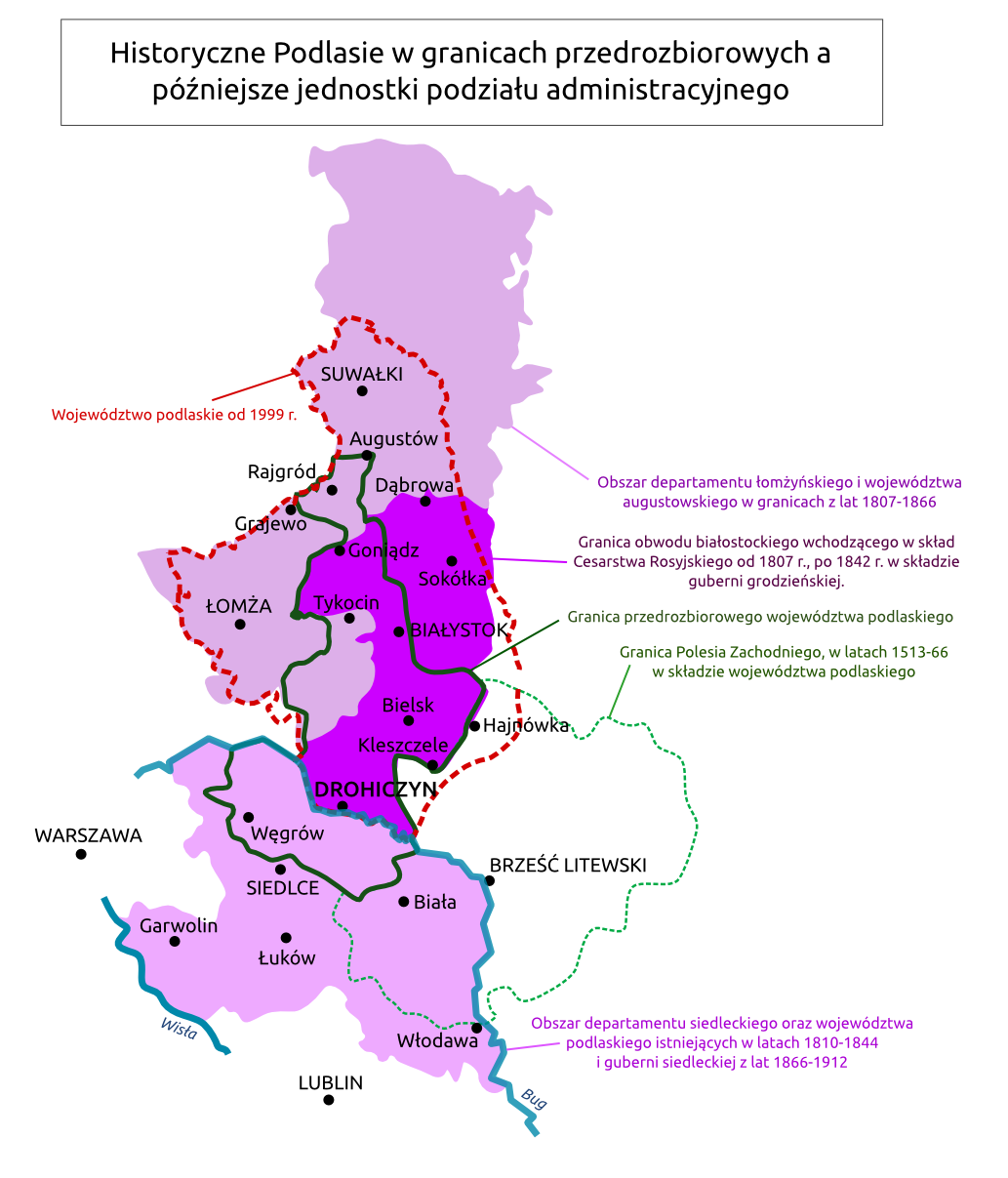
Historic Podlachian borders

Podlasie is located along the middle stretch of the Bug River between Mazovia in the west, Polesia and Volhynia in the east, the Narew River in the north and the Chełm Land in the south. The borders of Podlasie changed with time and was not the same as historical Podlaskie Voivodeship. Podlasie is sometimes divided into two parts (southern and northern), which had different administrative subordination.

Traditional capital of Podlasie is Drohiczyn that lies into northern and southern parts. The former is included in the modern-day Podlaskie Voivodeship with its capital at Białystok (the historical boundary goes exactly through the city). Sometimes, Siedlce has been considered the capital of the region.

== Coat of arms ==
The coat of arms of Podlasie was introduced in 1569. It was created by combining the coats of arms of Poland (white eagle albeit without a crown) and Lithuania (mounted armoured knight holding a sword and shield with the Jagiellonian Double Cross).

== History ==
Podlasie is a multicultural and multi-religious region. It is the region where people's identity has been shaped throughout history by both the Orthodox and Roman Catholic churches, and since the Reformation, also by Evangelical churches. Until today, Podlasie has been considered Poland's most culturally diverse region. Throughout its early history, Podlasie was inhabited by various tribes of different ethnic roots. According to various sources, East Slavic tribes settled either in the 9th and 10th centuries (mostly Drevlians, with Dregoviches in the north and likely Dulebes in the south), or in the 11th and 12th centuries in the eastern and southern part. The Polish Masovians settled before the 11th century in the western part, as evidenced by Masovian-type strongholds from that period. In the 12th century, the northern part was settled by the Yotvingians, and afterwards the region was devastated by Yotvingian and Lithuanian raids. In the 13th century, the Yotvingians were driven out of Podlasie by Bolesław V the Chaste and Leszek II the Black, and the region was repopulated by Poles from Masovia, including minor nobility. Since the 13th century, Podlasie was contested by Poland and Lithuania, with varying ownership. In 1253 Pope Innocent IV recognized Polish sovereignty over Podlasie. In the 14th century, Polish King Casimir III the Great granted the southern part to Lithuania. In 1379, the Teutonic Knights ravaged the region and unsuccessfully besieged Mielnik and Brześć.

In the late 14th century the area passed to Mazovian Piast rule. In 1446, Podlasie became part of the Grand Duchy again, but from 1496 southwestern parts of Podlasie (Drohiczyn Land and Mielnik Land) and from 1501 the northern part (Bielsk Land) used Polish law instead of Lithuanian. A renewal of the Polish–Lithuanian union was concluded in Mielnik in 1501. In 1513 King Sigismund I the Old formed the Podlaskie Voivodeship (adjective of Podlasie). In 1566, the southeastern part of the Voivodeship became part of the newly formed Brest Litovsk Voivodeship as Brest Litovsk County.

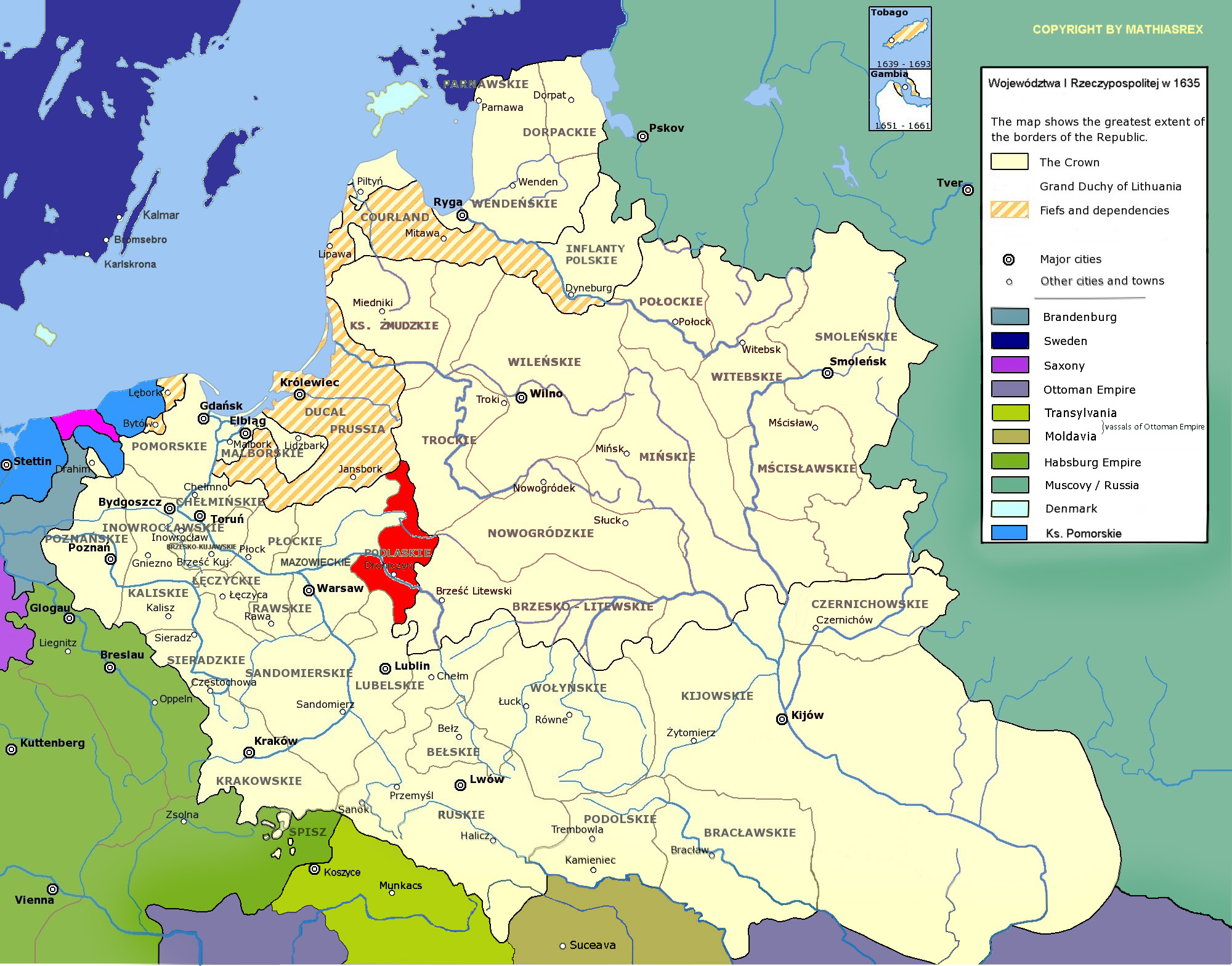
The Podlaskie Voivodeship in the Polish–Lithuanian Commonwealth in 1635.

In 1569, shortly before the Union of Lublin which formally united Poland and Lithuania as the Polish-Lithuanian Commonwealth, Podlasie was returned to the Kingdom of Poland by the Privilege of restoration of Podlasie land to the Polish Crown. It was the northernmost part of the Lesser Poland Province of Poland. The voivodeship was divided into three lands (ziemie): Drohiczyn, Mielnik and Bielsk. Knyszyn was the favorite residence of King Sigismund II Augustus, who died there in 1572, ending the reign of the Jagiellonian dynasty in Poland. Polish Renaissance writer Łukasz Górnicki, after his appointment as starost of Tykocin in 1572, resided and wrote many of his works in Lipniki in Podlasie.

Podlasie was subtracted by extensive royal estates, numerous small estates of the nobility (with the exception of the eastern and southern outskirts) and a dense network of small towns. Petty nobility often cultivated their land on their own, and there were many places where the nobility had no serfs, making certain parts of Podlasie, according to Polish historian, geographer and ethnographer Zygmunt Gloger, the place with the highest percentage of free agricultural population in Europe in the feudal era. Polish nobles in Podlasie became so numerous that from the 16th century some migrated to other regions, including Lesser Poland and Lithuania, where they often made significant fortunes.

In the 17th and early 18th century, the chief regional royal residence in Podlasie was Tykocin. In December 1630, King Sigismund III Vasa and his family took shelter there from an epidemic, and in 1633 Władysław IV Vasa also stopped there. In 1653, Podlasie itself was hit by an epidemic. The region was invaded by Sweden during the Deluge, but in 1657, Poles recaptured Tykocin. In 1661, renowned Polish military commander Stefan Czarniecki was granted the Tykocin starostwo with the towns of Tykocin and Białystok as a reward for his military service during the Swedish invasion of Poland of 1655–1660. Two Polish Protestant synods were held in Podlasie, a Calvinist one in Orla in 1644 and a Lutheran one in Węgrów in 1780. Tykocin was the place where the Order of the White Eagle, Poland's oldest and highest order, was established.

During the Swedish invasion of Poland of 1701–1706, in 1702, Tykocin was the place of talks between delegates of Poland and Sweden. In 1704, Podlasie protested against the election of Stanisław Leszczyński as King of Poland. Swedish and Russian troops often passed through the region during the war.

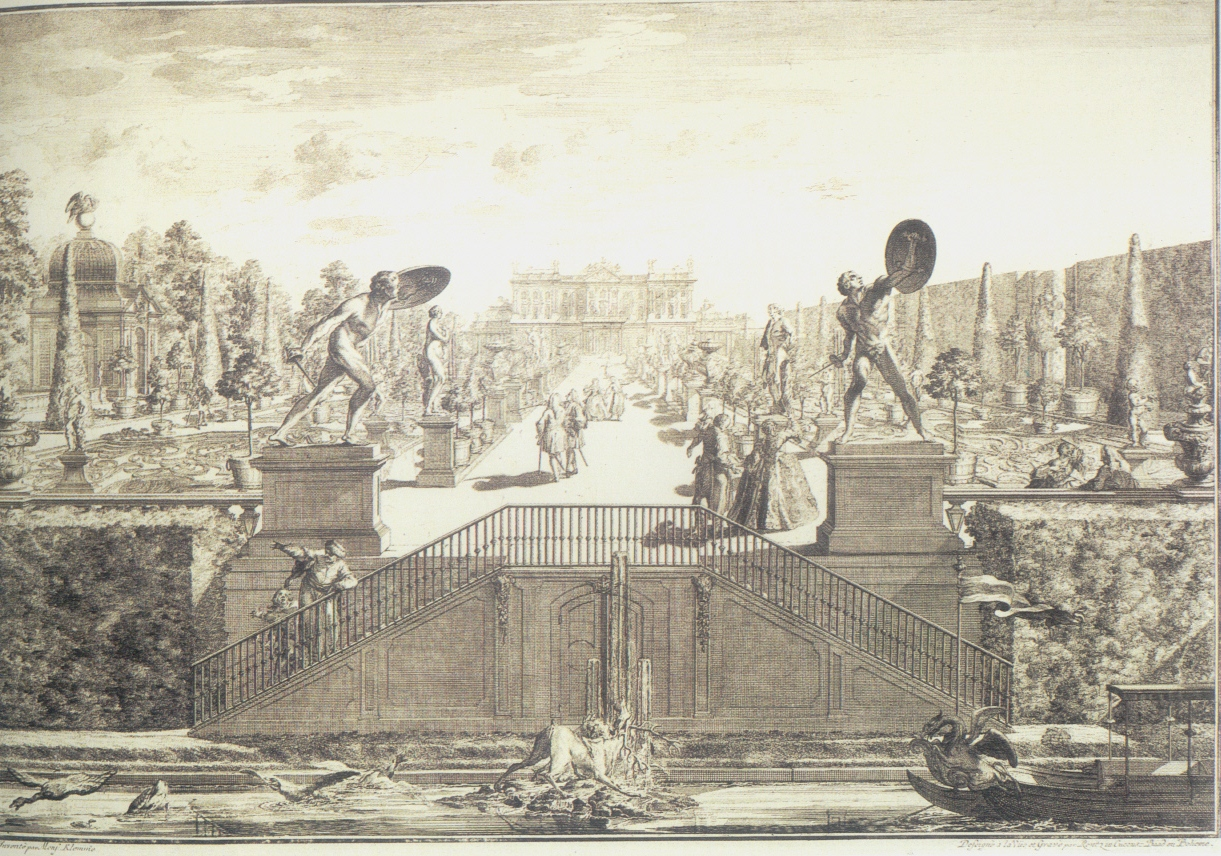
Branicki Palace and garden in Białystok in the 18th century

In the 18th and 19th century the private town of Białystok became the main center of the region, thanks to the patronage of the Branicki family and the development of the textile industry. Due to the city's palace, parks and edifices, Białystok was dubbed the "Versailles of Podlasie". At that time, Polish kings traveling through Podlasie mainly resided in Białystok, i.e. Augustus II the Strong in 1726 and 1729 and Augustus III of Poland in 1744, 1752 and 1755. The School of Civil and Military Engineering, Poland's first military technical college, and Komedialnia, one of the oldest theaters in Poland, were founded in Białystok in 1745 and 1748, respectively. Białystok was a regional brewing center with 33 breweries as of 1771, with the Podlachian Beer now listed as a protected traditional beverage by the Ministry of Agriculture and Rural Development of Poland.

In 1733, during the War of the Polish Succession, supporters of Augustus III retreated from Warsaw to Węgrów. In 1767, Jan Klemens Branicki and Wacław Rzewuski protested against the Radom Confederation in Brańsk.

=== Partition and Napoleonic Wars ===
Following the 1795 Third Partition of Poland, Podlasie was divided between the Kingdom of Prussia and the Habsburg monarchy (Austrian Empire from 1804), with the Bug forming the border between them. Part of Podlasie's eastern border became the boundary between Prussia and the Russian Empire. Within Prussia the Podlachian territory was organised as part of the Białystok Department of New East Prussia, which also included parts of the former Mazovian and Trakai Voivodeships; the Habsburg portion lay mostly within the Siedlce Kreis of West Galicia (Galicia and Lodomeria from 1803).

In 1807, by the Treaties of Tilsit, Prussia ceded all of its gains in the second and third partitions, as well as part of the first. Most of this territory, including the western and northern parts of Prussian Podlasie, became part of the Duchy of Warsaw, a Polish client state of the First French Empire, while the east-central part including Białystok fell under Russian rule as the Belostok Oblast. The Podlachian territory within the Belostok Oblast corresponded with the Bielsk and Drohiczyn Uyezds (roughly "counties") and the western part of Belostoksky Uyezd. The small amounts of Podlachian territory in the Duchy of Warsaw lay within the Łomża Department, itself based on the territory of the Prussian Białystok Departement after the removal of the Belostock Oblast. The Habsburg part of Podlasie became part of the Duchy of Warsaw by the 1809 Treaty of Schönbrunn, forming much of the Siedlce Department. Although Prussian and Austrian rule was brief, it has remained administratively divided by the Bug ever since.

=== Russian rule ===
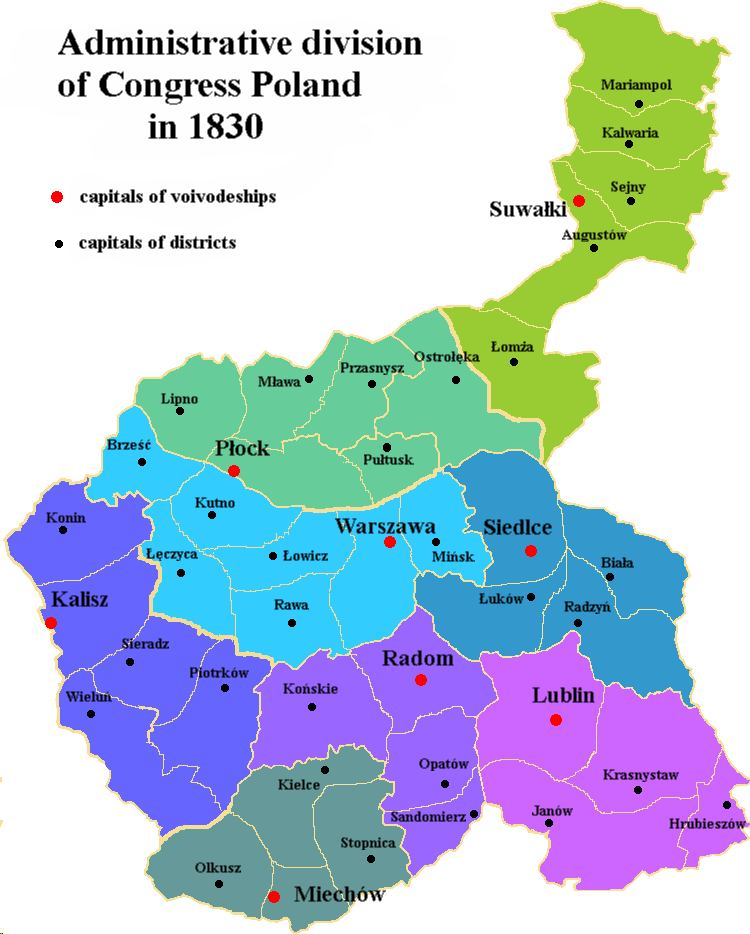
Congress Poland c. 1830.
Augustów Voivodeship
Podlachia Voivodeship

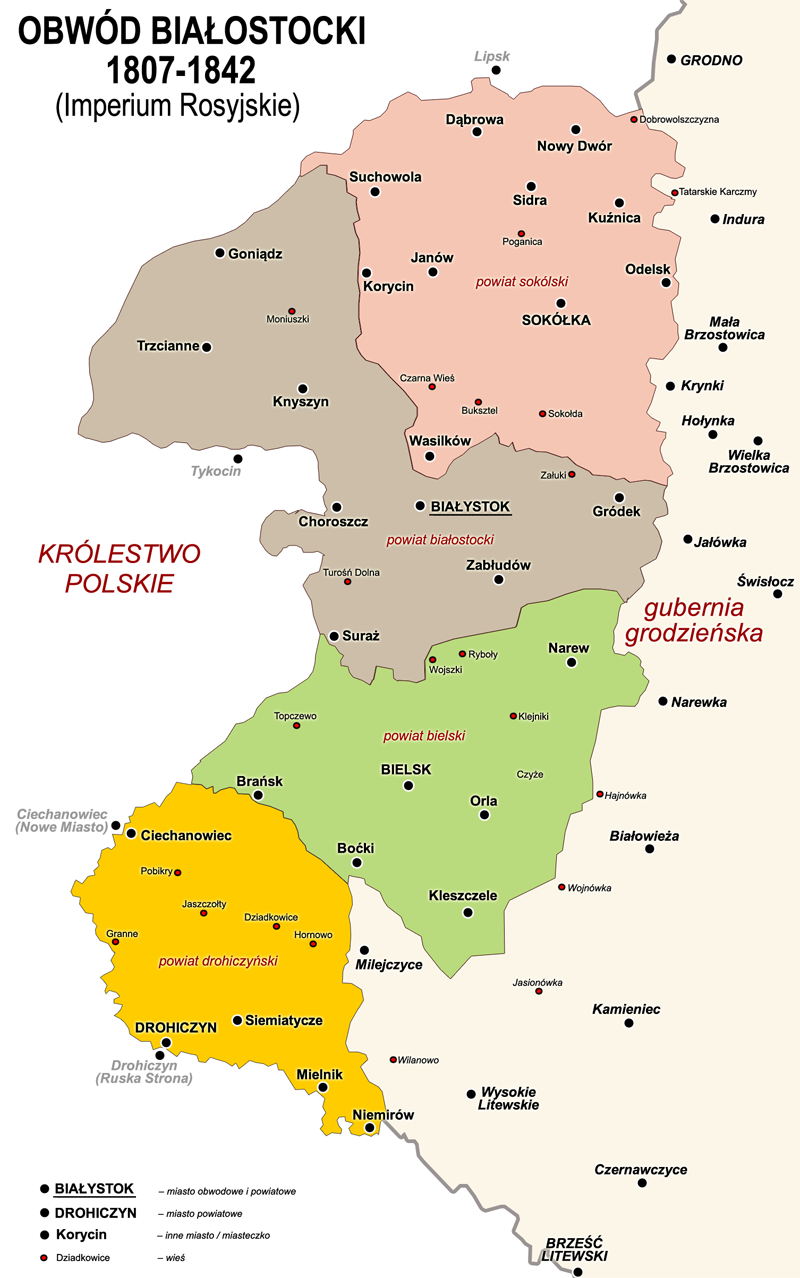
Belostok Oblast 1807–42
Belostok Uyezd
Bielsk Uyezd
Drohiczyn Uyezd

At the end of the Napoleonic wars in 1815, the Congress of Vienna transformed most of the Duchy of Warsaw, including the formerly Podlachian parts, into "Congress Poland" (formally the Kingdom of Poland) and placed it in a personal union with Russia; with that, all of Podlasie fell under Russian control. In theory this kingdom was created as an autonomous entity but in practice its separate laws and freedoms were simply ignored by the Emperors and control was steadily centralised, particularly following the November and January Uprisings (1830–31, 1863–64). Within Congress Poland the former Siedlce Department became the Podlasie Voivodeship, while the former Łomża Department became the Augustów Voivodeship; these became the Podlachian and Augustów Governorates in 1837.

In 1842 the Belostok Oblast was dissolved and merged into Grodno Governorate, and the Drohiczyn Uyezd was merged into Bielsk Uyezd. In 1844 the Podlachian Governorate was merged into the Lublin Governorate.

In the second half of the 19th century, Białystok grew into a significant center of the textile industry, the largest after Łódź in then-partitioned Poland. Białystok was the largest industrial center between Warsaw and Łódź in the west, Saint Petersburg in the north and Moscow in the east, and was nicknamed "Manchester of the North".

In the 19th century the region was a stronghold of Polish resistance against Russian rule. The battles of Węgrów and Siemiatycze, both fought in Podlasie in 1863, were among the largest battles of the January Uprising. Stanisław Brzóska, the last partisan of the January Uprising, operated there until 1865. He was hanged publicly by the Russians in Sokołów Podlaski in May 1865. As a result of the uprising, in 1867 Congress Poland was formally absorbed into Russia as the Vistula Land (Privislinsky Krai), although the Kingdom still nominally existed. The Podlachian Governorate was also restored under the name Siedlce Governorate, and the Augustów Governorate was split into the Łomża and Suwałki Governorates; Augustów itself went to Suwałki Governorate.

According to the Russian Imperial Census of 1897, the most spoken languages in the Siedlce Governorate were Polish (66.13%), Yiddish (15.56%) and Ukrainian (13.95%). At the same time the most spoken languages in Bielsk Uyezd were Ukrainian (39.1%), Polish (34.9%), Yiddish (14.9%), Russian (5.9%) and Belarusian (4.9%); those in the Białystok Uyezd were Polish (33.95%), Yiddish (28.34%), Belarusian (26.13%), Russian (6.68%) and German (3.59%).

In 1912 Siedlce Governorate was once again abolished and divided between the Lublin, Łomża and Kholm Governorates, with all three gaining some parts of the former Podlasie; Kholm Governorate was also removed administratively from the Vistula Land, instead being made part of the Kiev General Governorate.

=== World War I and interbellum ===
During World War I Podlasie was occupied by the German Empire in the summer of 1915, with most of the Vistula Land falling under the Government General of Warsaw (later the Central Powers puppet Kingdom of Poland) while the areas further east, including Białystok and the Suwałki Governorate, fell under Ober Ost (mostly in the Bialystok-Grodno District, which was later merged with the Lithuania District governed from Vilna).

With the German occupation, schools began instruction in national languages, including in Belarusian for that minority, and Germanization was pursued with mandatory German classes beginning in 1918. In the autumn of 1916, a Belarusian teachers seminary was created in Svislach east of Podlasie (today in Belarus), and in all, around 350 Belarusian schools were created.

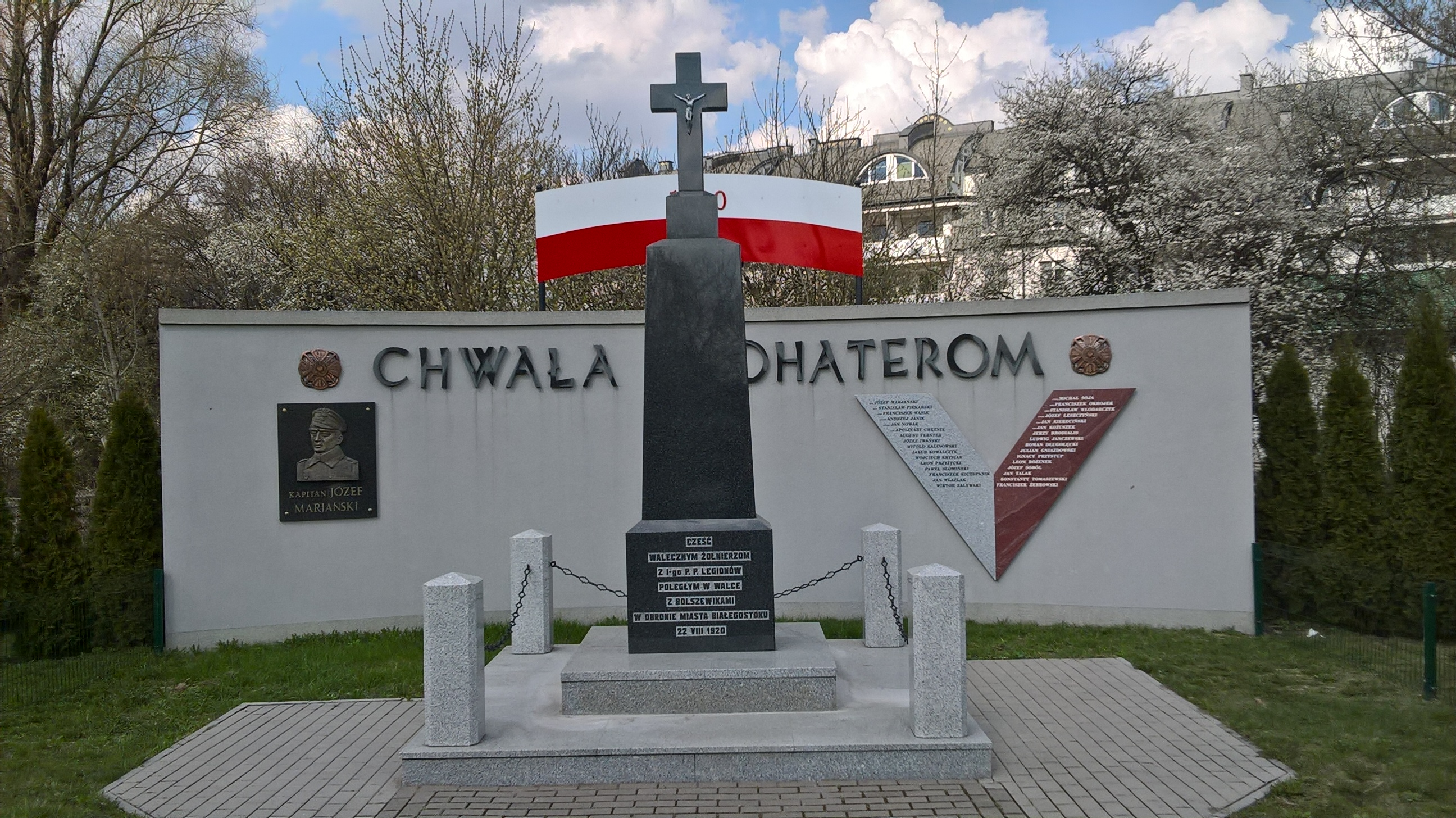
Monument to soldiers of the 1st Legions Infantry Regiment fallen in the Battle of Białystok in 1920

Following the German collapse in 1918 at the end of World War I, the future of Białystok and the larger Podlasie region was uncertain, with the new Republic of Poland, the Belarusian Democratic Republic and Soviet Russia all vying for control. Podlasie ultimately became part of Poland following the Polish–Soviet War and the 1921 Treaty of Riga.

During the interwar period the northern part fell entirely within the Białystok Voivodeship while the southern part belonged to the Lublin Voivodeship; the April 1938 reforms transferred Węgrów and Sokołów from Lublin to the Warsaw Voivodeship.

=== World War II to present ===
In 1939 Poland was invaded and partitioned between Nazi Germany and the Soviet Union following the Molotov–Ribbentrop Pact. Although the border agreed upon in the Pact would have given all of Podlasie to the Soviet Union, the final border agreed upon in the German–Soviet Boundary and Friendship Treaty signed after the invasion gave the southern part to the Nazi General Government, while the northern part of Podlasie was annexed by the Soviet Union as the Belastok Region of the Byelorussian SSR. Nazi Germany would annex the Soviet part as the Bialystok District in 1941. The Polish resistance movement was active in the region, with Białystok becoming the seat of one of the six main commands of the Union of Armed Struggle in occupied Poland (alongside Warsaw, Kraków, Poznań, Toruń and Lwów).

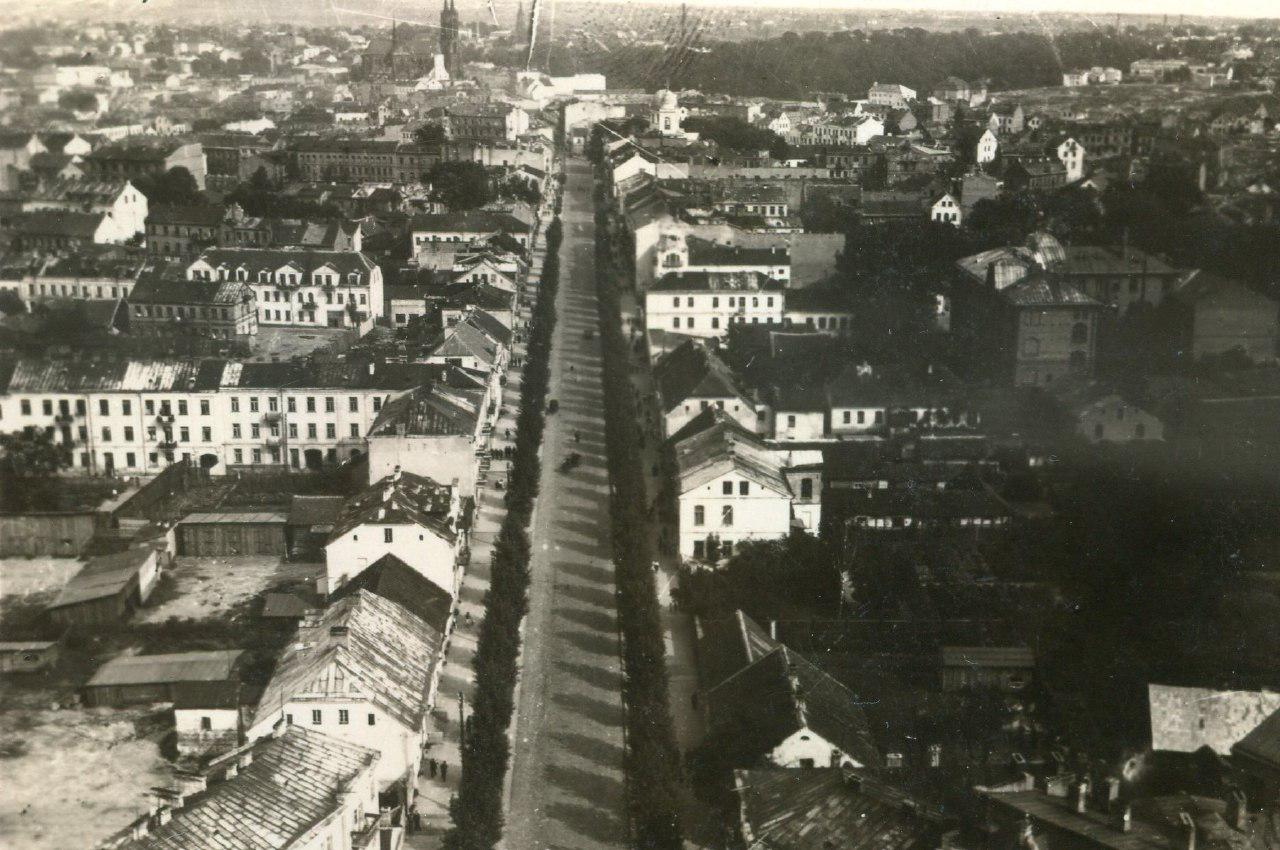
Białystok in 1940 when the city was occupied by the Soviet Union

Under German occupation, the population was subjected to mass arrests, executions and deportations to forced labour, concentration camps and Nazi ghettos, whereas under Soviet occupation the population was subjected to mass arrests, executions, deportations to forced labour in Siberia, Central Asia and the Far North. Sites of German massacres of either Polish or Jewish civilians include Mień, Olszewo (also Polish prisoners of war), Moskwin, Grabarka, Białystok, Tykocin, Rajsk, Paulinów, Krasowo-Częstki, Wnory-Wandy, Jabłoń-Dobki (see Nazi crimes against the Polish nation). Nowosiółki was the site of a massacre of hundreds of patients of a psychiatric hospital as part of Aktion T4. German forces also committed crimes against Italian and French POWs at subcamps of the Stalag 366 POW camp with executions and massacres of Italians and French in Międzyrzec Podlaski and Hola, respectively, with the Italians also subjected to mass starvation, epidemics, beatings and killings at Biała Podlaska. Many Poles from Podlasie were among the victims of the Soviet-perpetrated Katyn massacre.

The region once again returned to Polish control in 1945.

In 1999 the modern Podlaskie Voivodeship was established which encompasses the northern part of historic Podlasie, including Białystok and Drohiczyn, as well as surrounding areas, including Łomża and Suwałki. Its southern border lies along the Bug. Podlasie makes up only 36% of this voivedeship.

== Demographics ==
=== Ethnic situation ===
A fragment of the ethnographic map by Aleksandr Rittikh with ethnic composition of Podlasie, 1875

While today Podlasie is mostly inhabited by Poles, many Belarusians live in the eastern parts. According to Polish census of 2002, in Podlaskie Voivodeship there were 46,041 Belarusians (3.9%) and 1,366 Ukrainians (0.1%). Autochthonous inhabitants have difficulties in national self-identification and identifying of their language. They often identify their nationality as "tutejszy" (literally "locals"). Based on comparison of a survey and the census, Marek Barwiński supposes that people with a low level of national identity during the census usually choose the major nationality in their region.

Orthodox autochthonous inhabitants are known as khakhly (without any negative connotations, though today in Ukraine it is known as an ethnic slur for Ukrainians). According to Mykhailo Lesiv, this name appeared after it was used to denote locals in the Russian Imperial Army. Many scientific researches prove that the orthodox population in Podlasie have Ukrainian origin (19th century censuses, historical and linguistic researches), though today the number of people with the Ukrainian identity is very small.

Until the 19th century, Podlasie was populated by the Polish-speaking yeomanry (drobna szlachta), Jews (primarily in towns), and Ruthenian Greek-Catholics speaking a dialect related to modern Ukrainian – the so-called Khakhlak (Chachlak) dialect, which derived its name from a derogatory term for Ukrainians (khakhol or khokhol being the name of the traditional haircut of Ukrainian Cossacks).

In the 19th century, the inhabitants of Podlasie were under the rule of the Russian Empire, with southern Podlasie constituting a part of Russian-controlled Congress Poland. After 1831, Russian authorities forbade the Greek-Catholic faith in northern Podlasie and it disappeared from the area. In 1875, Russians forbade this rite in the southern portion as well, and all Greek-Catholic inhabitants were forced to accept the Eastern Orthodox faith. However, the resistance of the local people was surprisingly strong and Ruthenian speakers from this area rejected the separation from the Pope. In 1874, blessed Wincenty Lewoniuk and 12 companions were killed by Russian soldiers in Pratulin. In reaction to these measures, the Ruthenians of southern Podlasie began to identify themselves with the national movement of the Roman Catholic Poles. To preserve the full communion with the Pope, they changed their rite from Eastern to Latin before the compulsory conversion of Greek Catholics into Orthodox. In 1912, Russian authorities issued a tolerance edict that made it possible to change confession from Orthodox to Roman Catholic (but not to Greek-Catholic, which had been completely deleted). A majority of the inhabitants of southern Podlasie changed their faith from Orthodox to Roman Catholic. At present, very few people in this area speak Ruthenian and nearly all consider themselves Poles. Meanwhile, the eastern part of northern Podlasie is still populated by Belarusians.

Podlasie is also the cultural center of Poland's small Tatar minority as well. After the annexation of eastern Poland into the Soviet Union following World War II, Poland was left with only two Tatar villages, Bohoniki and Kruszyniany (both outside the historical borders of Podlasie). Some Tatars from the territories annexed to the USSR have been repatriated to Poland and clustered in cities, particularly Białystok. In 1925 the Muslim Religious Union (Muzułmański Związek Religijny) was formed in Białystok. In 1992, the Union of Tatars of the Republic of Poland (Związek Tatarów Rzeczypospolitej Polskiej) with autonomous branches in Białystok and Gdańsk began operating.

=== Language ===
The dominant language in Podlaskie Voivodeship is Polish. Autochthonous inhabitants speak a Podlachian variety. Many linguists relate them to the Ukrainian language. Linguists have been exploring them since 19th century, when they were also known as Siedlce dialects (because of the name of Siedlce Governorate, where the dialects were mostly investigated). There is a problem if they should be considered as part of west Polisian dialects subgroup or as a separate subgroup of northern dialectal group of the Ukrainian language. In the Northern Podlasie Podlachian subdialects are also often considered to be Belarusian dialects or sometimes Ruthenian dialects.

Since the locals are known as khakhly, the local language is also called Khakhlatska mova (Ukrainian: хахлацька мова, "khokhols' language"). S. Zhelekhov wrote in 1884 that the people call their language "Polesian, but those, who were in the army (in the soldiers) call it Khakhlatska".

== Culture ==
=== Cuisine ===
The cuisine of Podlasie reflects its historic ethnic diversity and its location near Polish borders with Belarus and Lithuania.

The most famous regional dish is potato babka (babka ziemniaczana), widely popular in both Poland and Belarus. Kartacze are potato dumplings widespread in the northern part of the Podlasie near the Suwałki Region. The bialy rolls (Bialystoker kuchen) of New York's Jewish community also originated in Podlasie.

== Cities and towns ==
	City	Population (2015–16)	Pop. (1931)	Administrative division	Additional information
1.	Brest	340,141	48,431	Brest Region	Part of Podlasie until 1566, after 1566 it is rather considered part of Polesia; former royal city of Poland.
2.	Białystok	295,981	91,335	Podlaskie Voivodeship	Former private town of the Branicki family.
3.	Siedlce	76,686	36,927	Masovian Voivodeship	Historically part of Lesser Poland, since the creation of the Podlaskie Voivodeship in 1816 the area is referred to as Southern Podlasie.
4.	Biała Podlaska	57,414	17,549	Lublin Voivodeship	Part of Podlasie until 1566, after 1566 it was rather considered part of Polesia, nowadays the area is referred to as Southern Podlasie; former private town of the Radziwiłł family.
5.	Kobryn	52,655	10,101	Brest Region	Part of Podlasie until 1566, after 1566 it is rather considered part of Polesia.
6.	Łuków	30,500		Lublin Voivodeship	Historically part of Lesser Poland, since the creation of the Podlaskie Voivodeship in 1816 the area is referred to as Southern Podlasie.
7.	Augustów	30,449	12,147	Podlaskie Voivodeship	Former royal city of Poland.
8.	Byaroza	29,408	4,521	Brest Region	Area was part of Podlasie until 1566, after 1566 it is rather considered part of Polesia.
9.	Bielsk Podlaski	26,336	7,029	Podlaskie Voivodeship	Former royal city of Poland, capital of Bielsk Land.
10.	Hajnówka	21,559		Podlaskie Voivodeship	
11.	Sokołów Podlaski	18,720	9,901	Masovian Voivodeship	Former private town of the Kiszka and Radziwiłł families.
12.	Pruzhany	18,459	8,013	Brest Region	Part of Podlasie until 1566, after 1566 it is rather considered part of Polesia.
13.	Międzyrzec Podlaski	17,117	16,837	Lublin Voivodeship	Between 1574 and 1616 it was rather considered part of Polesia; former private town of the Zabrzeziński, Zbaraski, Opaliński and Czartoryski families.
14.	Radzyń Podlaski	16,010		Lublin Voivodeship	Historically part of Lesser Poland, since the creation of the Podlaskie Voivodeship in 1816 the area is referred to as Southern Podlasie.
15.	Łapy	16,005	6,674	Podlaskie Voivodeship	
16.	Siemiatycze	14,766	6,816	Podlaskie Voivodeship	Former private town of the Jabłonowski family.
17.	Włodawa	13,643	8,519	Lublin Voivodeship	Part of Podlasie until 1566, after 1566 it was rather considered part of Polesia, nowadays the area is referred to as Southern Podlasie; former private town.
18.	Zhabinka	13,357		Brest Region	Area was part of Podlasie until 1566, after 1566 it is rather considered part of Polesia.
19.	Węgrów	12,796	9,416	Masovian Voivodeship	Former private town of the Radziwiłł family, westernmost town of Podlasie.
20.	Malaryta	11,823		Brest Region	Area was part of Podlasie until 1566, after 1566 it is rather considered part of Polesia.
21.	Mońki	10,352		Podlaskie Voivodeship	
22.	Wysokie Mazowieckie	9,503	3,977	Podlaskie Voivodeship	Former private town.
23.	Kamyenyets	8,405	3,001	Brest Region	Part of Podlasie until 1566, after 1566 it is rather considered part of Polesia.
24.	Łosice	7,099	5,026	Masovian Voivodeship	Former royal city of Poland.
25.	Terespol	5,815	2,308	Lublin Voivodeship	Part of Podlasie until 1566, after 1566 it was rather considered part of Polesia, nowadays the area is referred to as Southern Podlasie; former private town.
26.	Choroszcz	5,782	2,905	Podlaskie Voivodeship	Former private town of the Branicki family.
27.	Vysokaye	5,164	2,739	Brest Region	Area was part of Podlasie until 1566, after 1566 it is rather considered part of Polesia.
28.	Ciechanowiec	4,840	4,029	Podlaskie Voivodeship	Former private town.
29.	Brańsk	3,867	4,204	Podlaskie Voivodeship	Former royal city of Poland.
30.	Knyszyn	2,850	4,123	Podlaskie Voivodeship	Former royal city of Poland, royal residence of King Sigismund II Augustus.
31.	Szepietowo	2,282		Podlaskie Voivodeship	Youngest town of Podlasie.
32.	Kosów Lacki	2,187		Masovian Voivodeship	
33.	Drohiczyn	2,125	2,309	Podlaskie Voivodeship	Historical capital of Podlasie, former royal city of Poland, capital of Drohiczyn Land.
34.	Tykocin	2,014	3,290	Podlaskie Voivodeship	
35.	Goniądz	1,900	3,449	Podlaskie Voivodeship	Former royal city of Poland.
36.	Mordy	1,819	3,287	Masovian Voivodeship	Former private town of the Radziwiłł and Ciecierski families.
37.	Rajgród	1,626	2,432	Podlaskie Voivodeship	Former royal city of Poland.
38.	Kleszczele	1,345	2,029	Podlaskie Voivodeship	Former royal city of Poland.
39.	Suraż	1,008	1,379	Podlaskie Voivodeship	Former royal city of Poland.

== Gallery ==
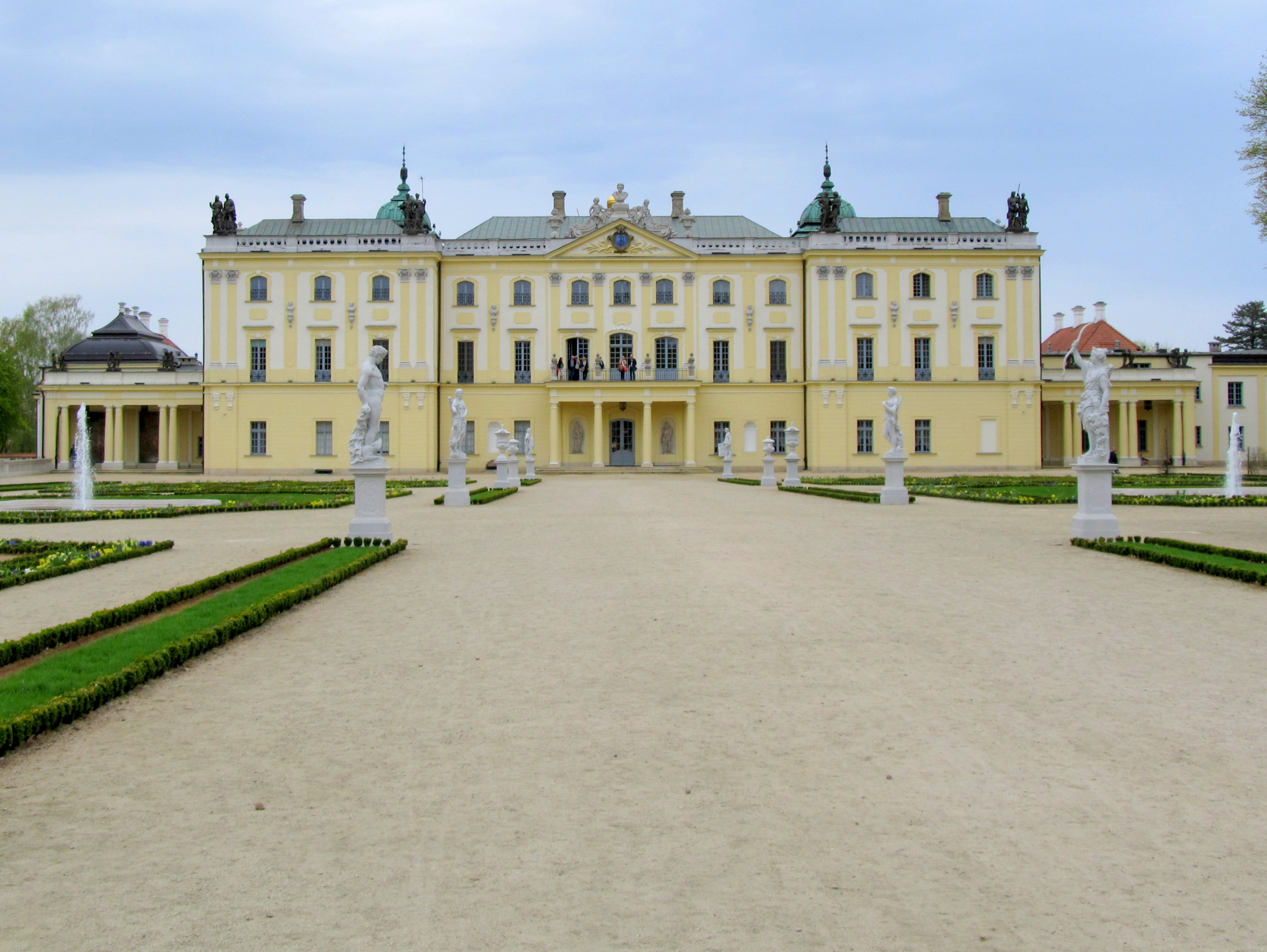
Branicki Palace in Białystok, the largest city of proper Podlasie

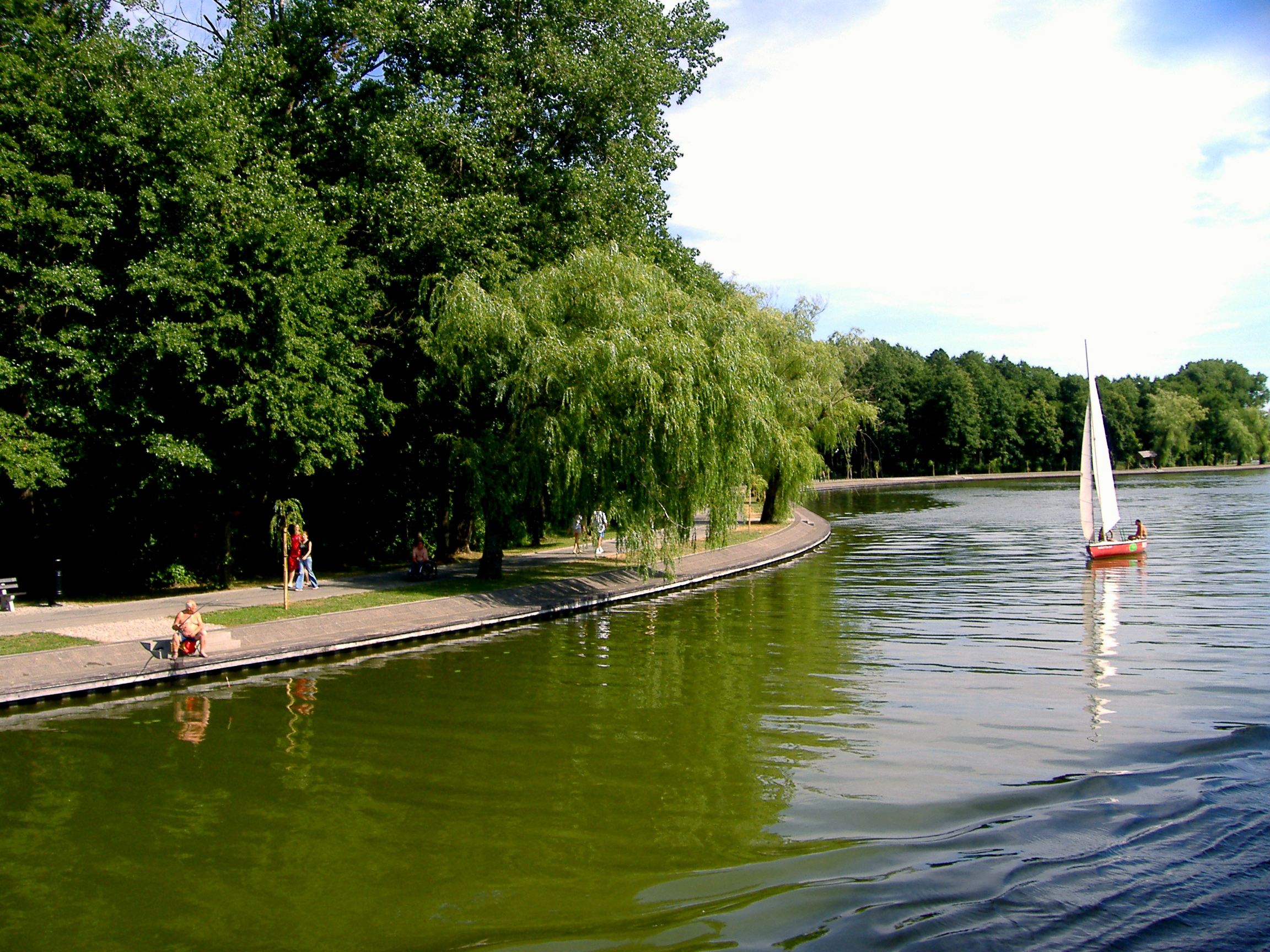
The former royal city of Augustów is the northernmost city of Podlasie and a popular summer tourist destination

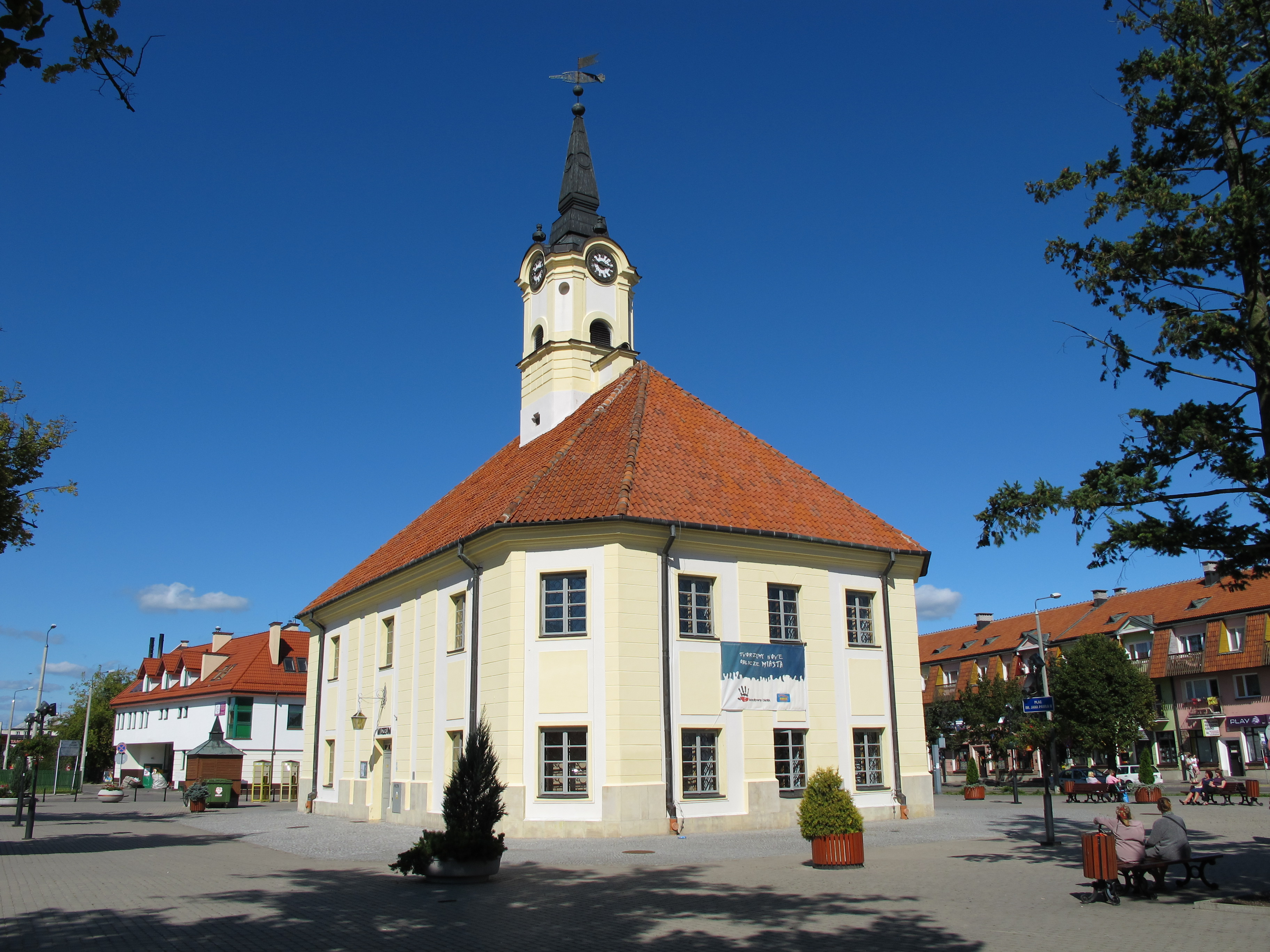
Baroque town hall in Bielsk Podlaski, a former royal city of Poland and capital of Bielsk Land

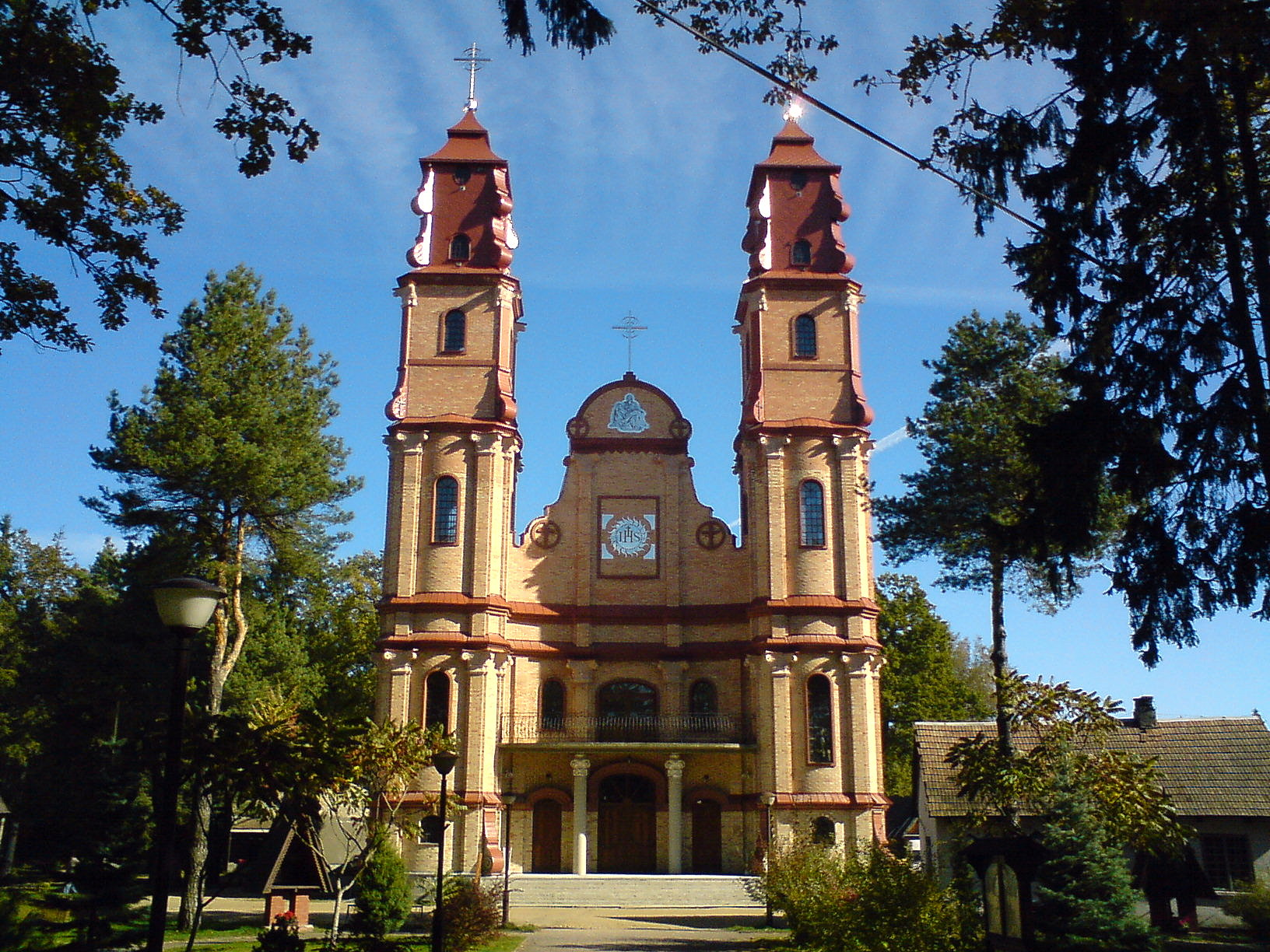
Hajnówka is notable for its proximity to the Białowieża Forest, the biggest primaeval forest in Europe

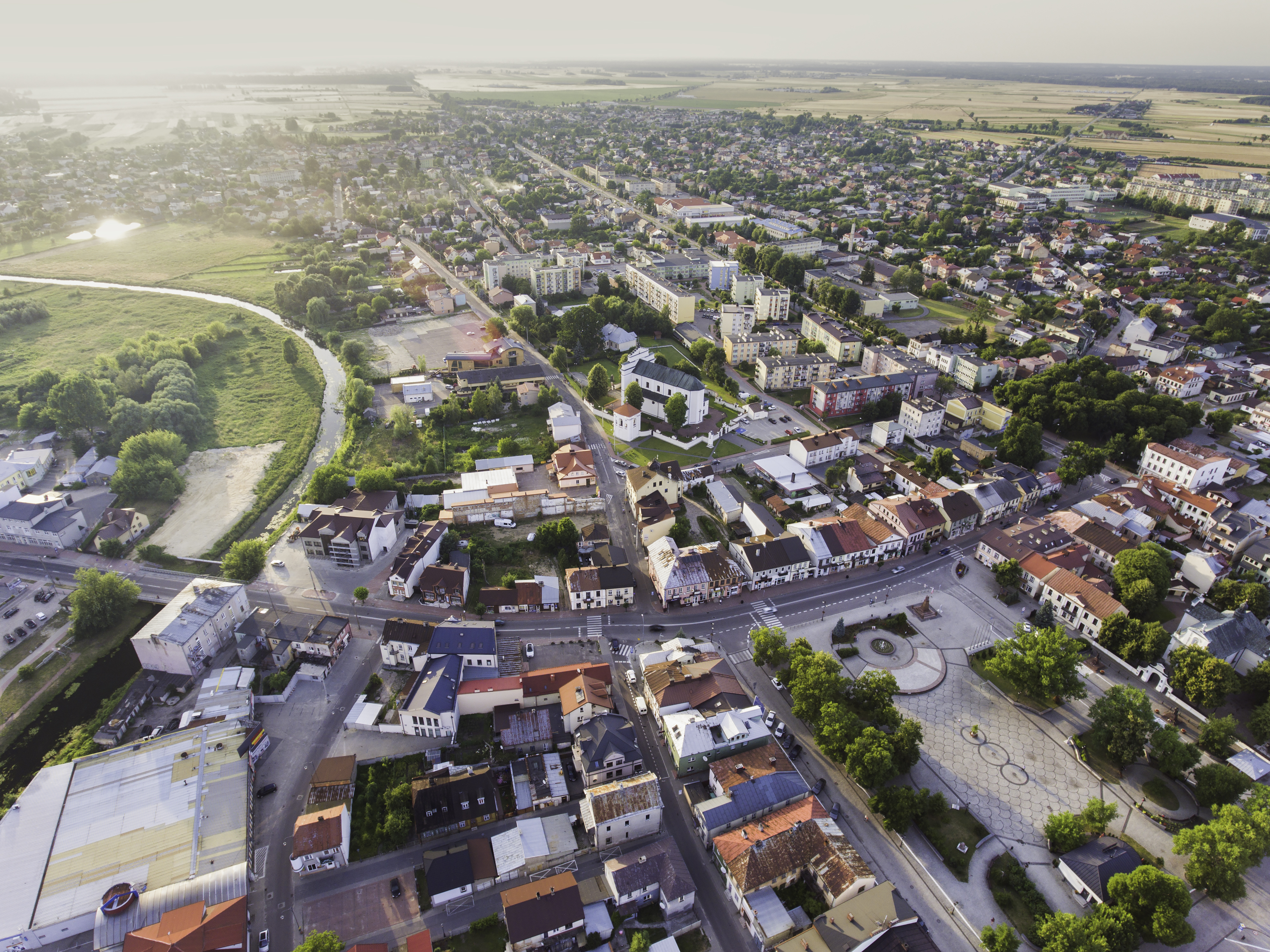
Aerial view of Międzyrzec Podlaski

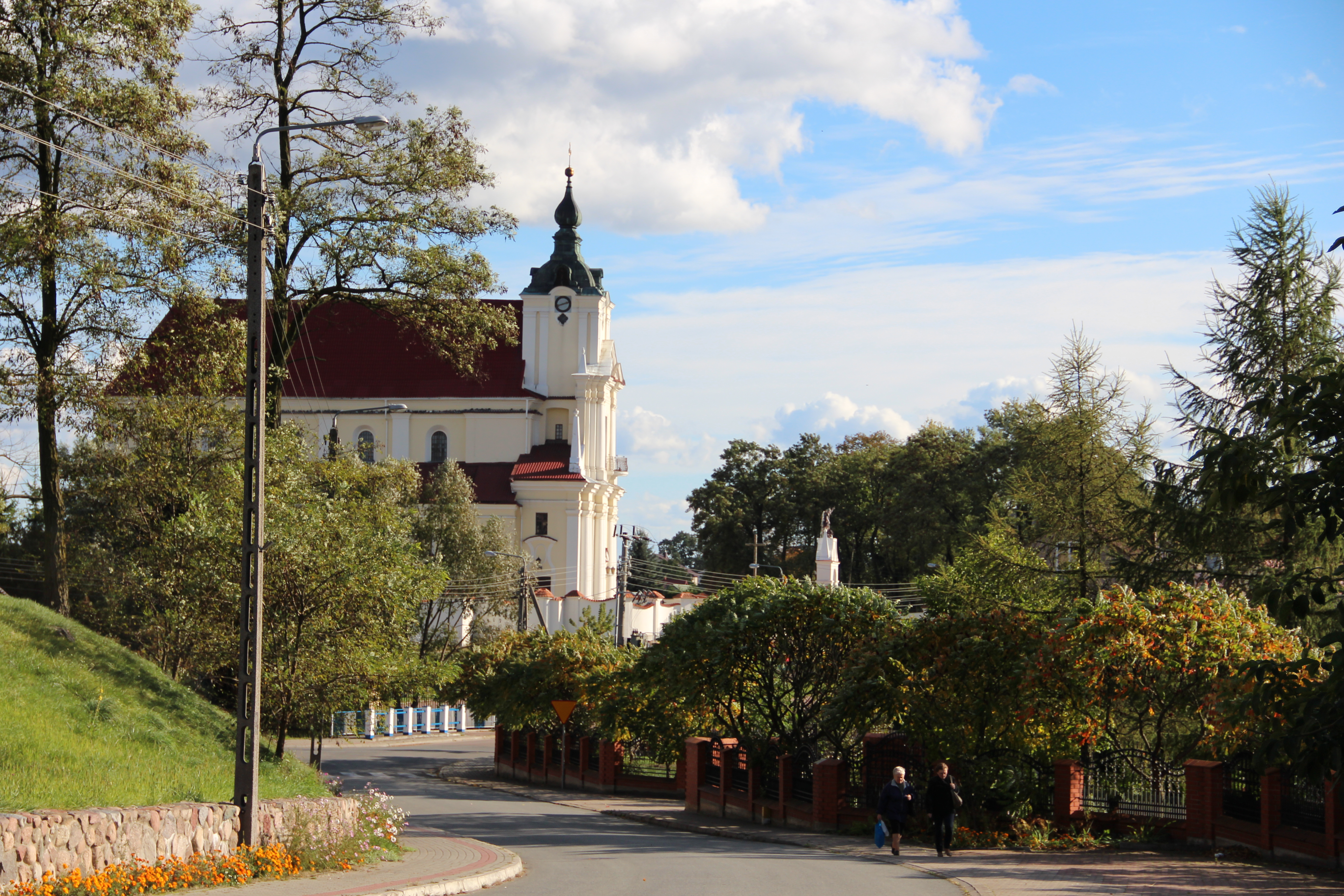
17th-century Church of the Assumption in Siemiatycze

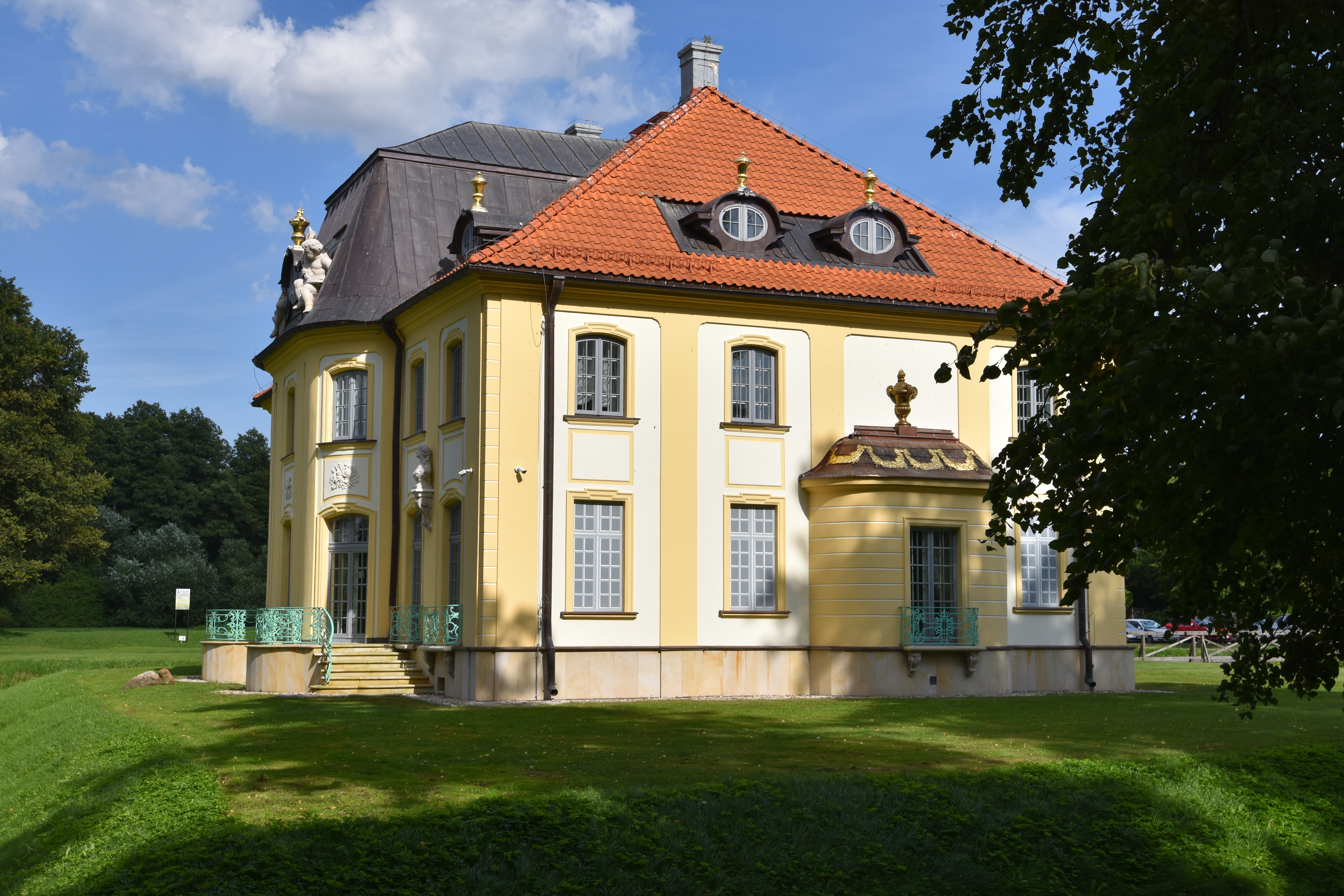
Branicki Palace in Choroszcz

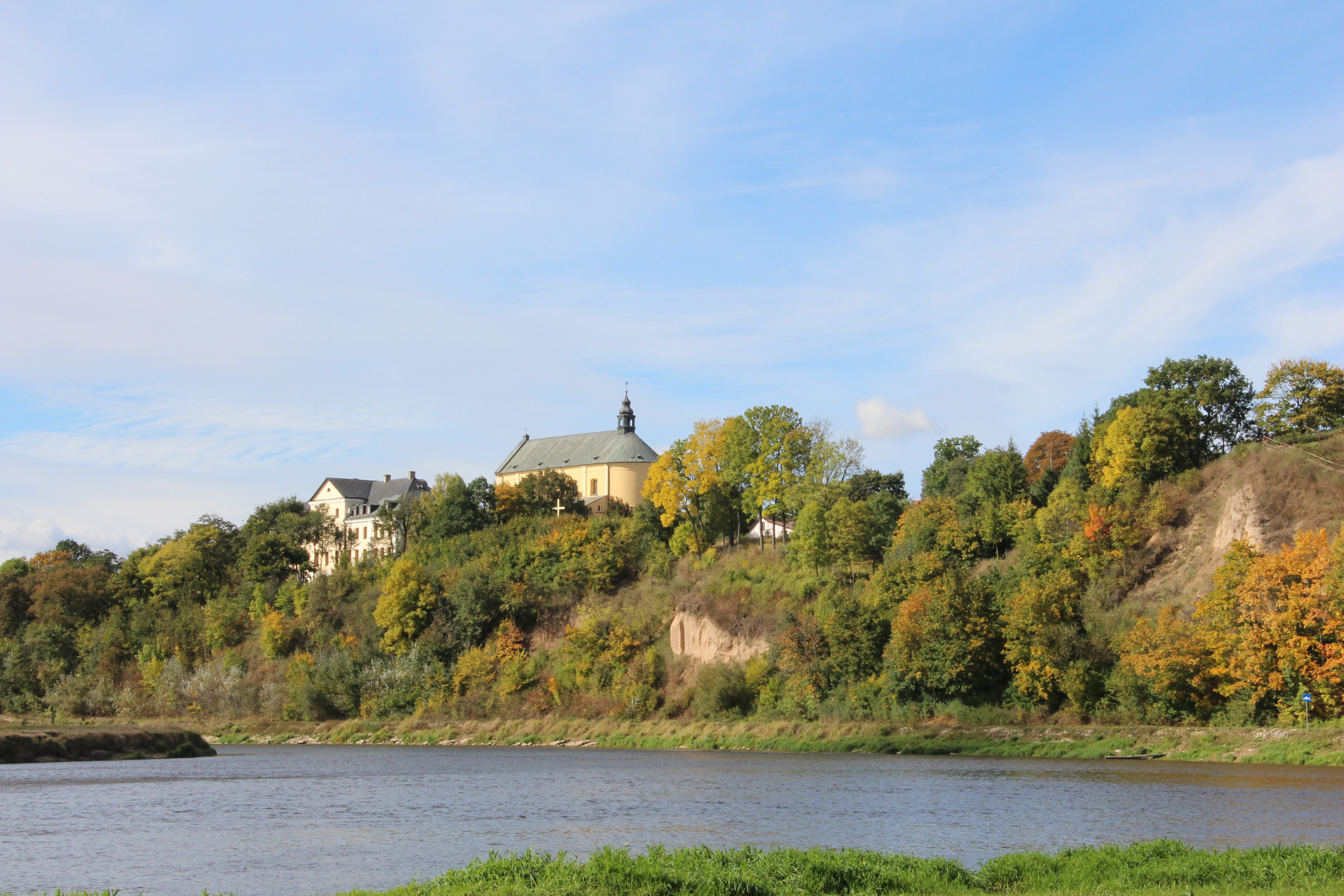
Drohiczyn and Bug river

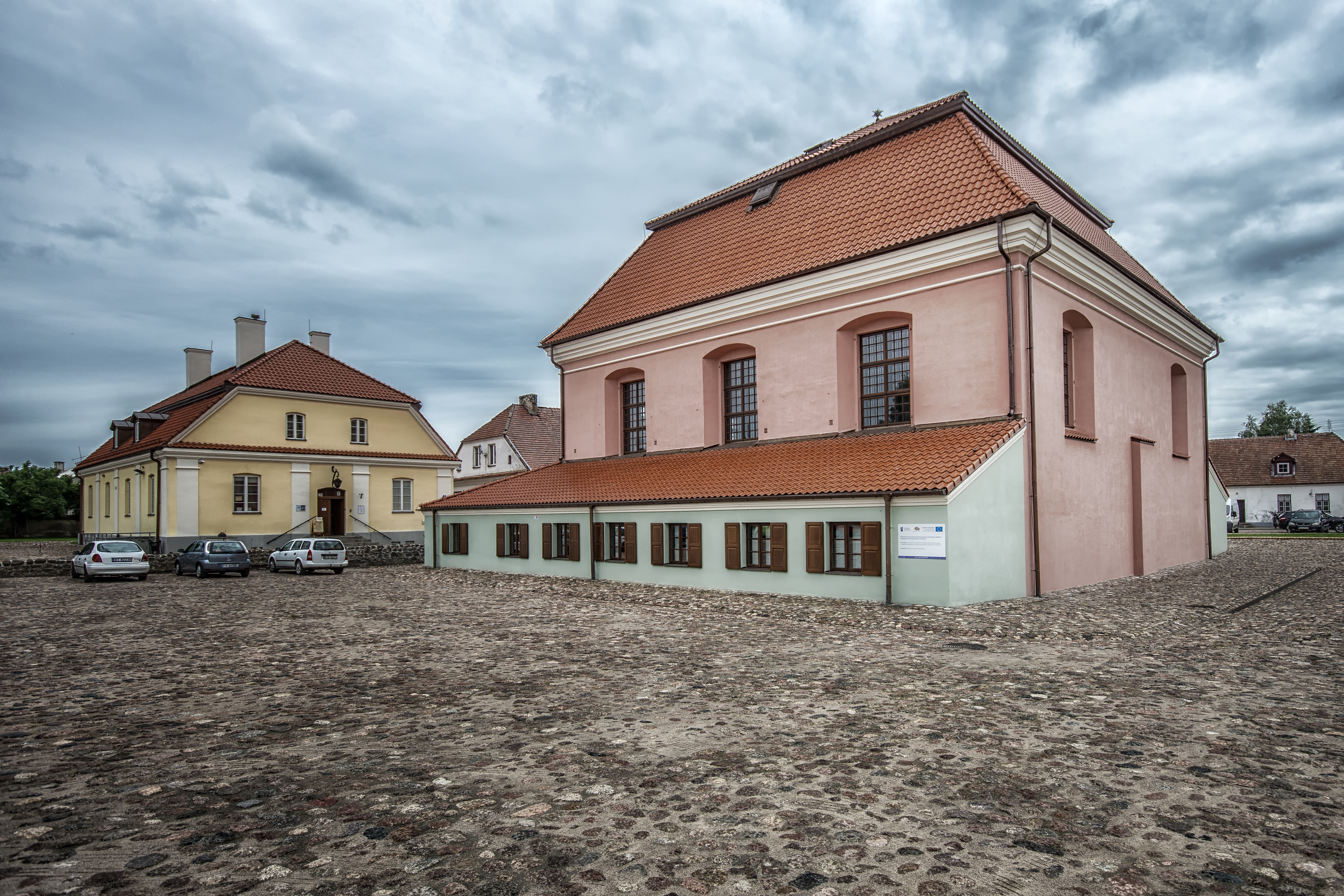
Tykocin Synagogue. Tykocin is one of the best preserved shtetls in Poland. The main synagogue dates back to the 17th century.

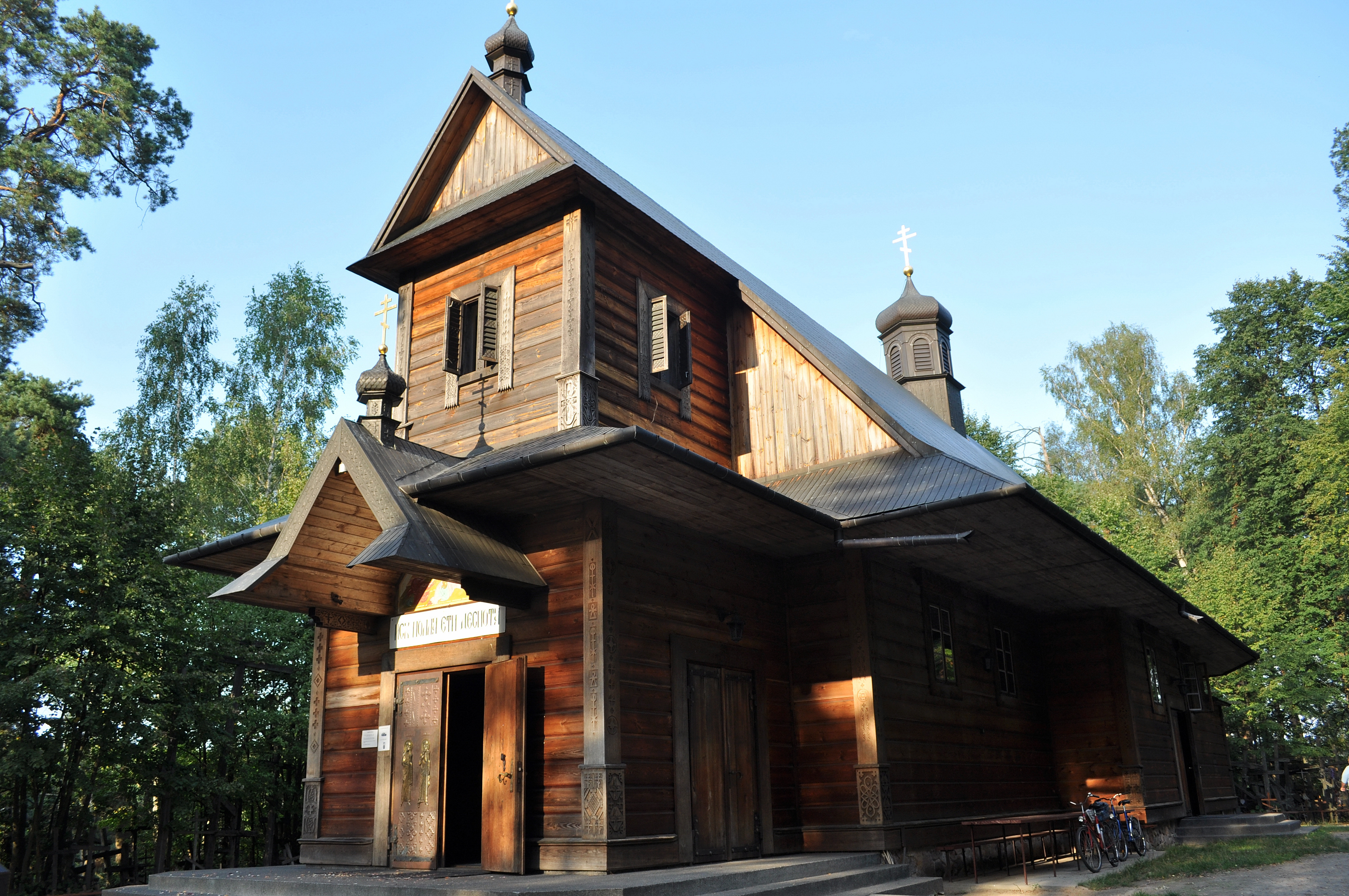
Orthodox sanctuary in Grabarka

== Sources ==
- Arkushyn, H. L. (2019). "Хахлацька мова на Підляшші" [Khakhatska language in Podlachia] (PDF). Українська мова (in Ukrainian) (1). Луцьк: 115–125. doi:10.15407/ukrmova2019.01.115. ISSN 1682-3540.
- Barwiński, Marek (2005). "Struktura narodowościowa i językowa mieszkańców południowo-wschodniej części województwa podlaskiego – porównanie wyników badań terenowych i Narodowego Spisu Powszechnego". Pogranicze (in Polish). Wydawnictwo Uniwersytetu w Białymstoku: 67–84. hdl:11089/3855. ISSN 1230-2392.
- Gloger, Zygmunt (1900). Geografia historyczna ziem dawnej Polski (in Polish). Kraków.
- Górczyk, Wojciech Jerzy (2020), The Former Reformati Order’s Monasteries Route Węgrów.
- Górczyk, Wojciech Jerzy (2018), Reformaci w Węgrowie. Architektura kościoła i miejsce fundacji węgrowskiej na tle działalności fundacyjnej Krasińskich Drohiczyński Przeglad Naukowy. Drohiczyńskie Towarzystwo Naukowe: 307–326.
- Lesiv, Mykhailo (1997). Українські говірки в Польщі [Ukrainian subdialects in Poland] (in Ukrainian). Український архів.
- Pichura, Gabriel (1965). "Podlasian and Polesian Black Ceramic Ware". Journal of Belarusian Studies. I (I): 51–54.
