= Stanisław Niemira =

Polish-Lithuanian noble and politician

Stanisław Niemira (1597 – 1648) of Gozdawa coat of arms was a Polish–Lithuanian Commonwealth noble and politician. Wojski of Podlaskie from 1611. Chorąży of Mielnik (1613-1617). Castellan of Podlaskie (1630–34). Voivode of Podlaskie (1634-1648).

He obtained the city rights for the village of Niemirów (up till then known as Niwice). Elected to the Sejm; member of several border dispute commissions.
