= Mielnik Land =

Former Polish administrative unit

Mielnik Land (Polish: ziemia mielnicka), also known as Land of Mielnik, was an administrative unit (ziemia) of both the Kingdom of Poland and the Polish–Lithuanian Commonwealth. With its seat in the town (now a village) of Mielnik, it belonged to Podlasie Voivodeship.

The history of Mielnik Land as a separate unit begins in the 1530s, when it was carved out of Drohiczyn Land. Until the Union of Lublin, the province of Podlasie was part of the Grand Duchy of Lithuania; in 1569 it was transferred to the Kingdom of Poland. Local sejmiks for Mielnik Land took place at Drohiczyn, where two envoys were selected to the Warsaw Sejm.

Mielnik Land was not divided into counties. It had two royal towns, Mielnik and Łosice, both were residences of the starostas. Other towns of the province were Siemiatycze, Niemirów Horodyszcze and Rossosz. The town of Mielnik had a royal castle, in which on October 23, 1501, the Union of Mielnik was signed.

The Land of Mielnik ceased to exist after the third partition of Poland in 1795.

== Sources ==
- Mielnik Land and its history
