= Drohiczyn Land =

Drohiczyn Land (Polish: ziemia drohiczyńska, also ziemia drohicka), named after the town of Drohiczyn, was an administrative unit (ziemia) of both the Kingdom of Poland and the Polish–Lithuanian Commonwealth. It was part of Podlasie Voivodeship.

The history of Drohiczyn Land as a separate entity dates back to 1413, when it was part of Trakai Voivodeship of the Grand Duchy of Lithuania. In 1513, it made up the newly created Podlasie Voivodeship, together with two other lands: Bielsk Land and Mielnik Land. Local sejmiks took place at Drohiczyn, where two envoys to the Warsaw Sejm were elected.

Drohiczyn Land ceased to exist after the Partitions of Poland.
