= Podlaskie Voivodeship (1513–1795) =

Voivodeship of the Grand Duchy of Lithuania then of the Kingdom of Poland

Coordinates: 52°23′44″N 22°39′28″E

Podlaskie Voivodeship Polish: Województwo Podlaskie Latin: Palatinatus Podlachiae
- Voivodeship of Lithuania (1513–1569), then Poland (1569–1795)
- 1513–1795
- Coat of arms

- The Podlaskie Voivodeship in the Polish–Lithuanian Commonwealth in 1619.
- Capital: Drohiczyn
- Government
  - Motto: Par putat esse nihil (Latin for 'Par thinks there is nothing')
- History
  - Established: 1513
  - Third Partition of Poland: 24 October 1795
- Political subdivisions: 3 lands, which were equivalent to counties
Preceded by	Succeeded by
Trakai Voivodeship; Berestia	Białystok Department; West Galicia
- Today part of: Poland; Belarus¹
- ¹ South-eastern part of the pre-1566 territory of the voivodeship.

The Podlaskie Voivodeship was formed in 1513 by Sigismund I the Old as a voivodeship in the Grand Duchy of Lithuania, from a split off part of the Trakai Voivodeship. After Lithuania's union with the Kingdom of Poland in 1569 and formation of the Polish–Lithuanian Commonwealth, the voivodeship was transferred to the Polish Crown, where it belonged to the Lesser Poland Province.

== History ==
In ca. 1274, the historical Podlachia region was added to the Grand Duchy of Lithuania. In 1391, the King of Poland and Grand Duke of Lithuania Jogaila attempted to transfer the region to Duke Vytautas' brother-in-law, Janusz I of Warsaw, Duke of Masovia, but from 1413 on Podlaskie was managed as part of Lithuania's Trakai Voivodeship.

=== Formation ===
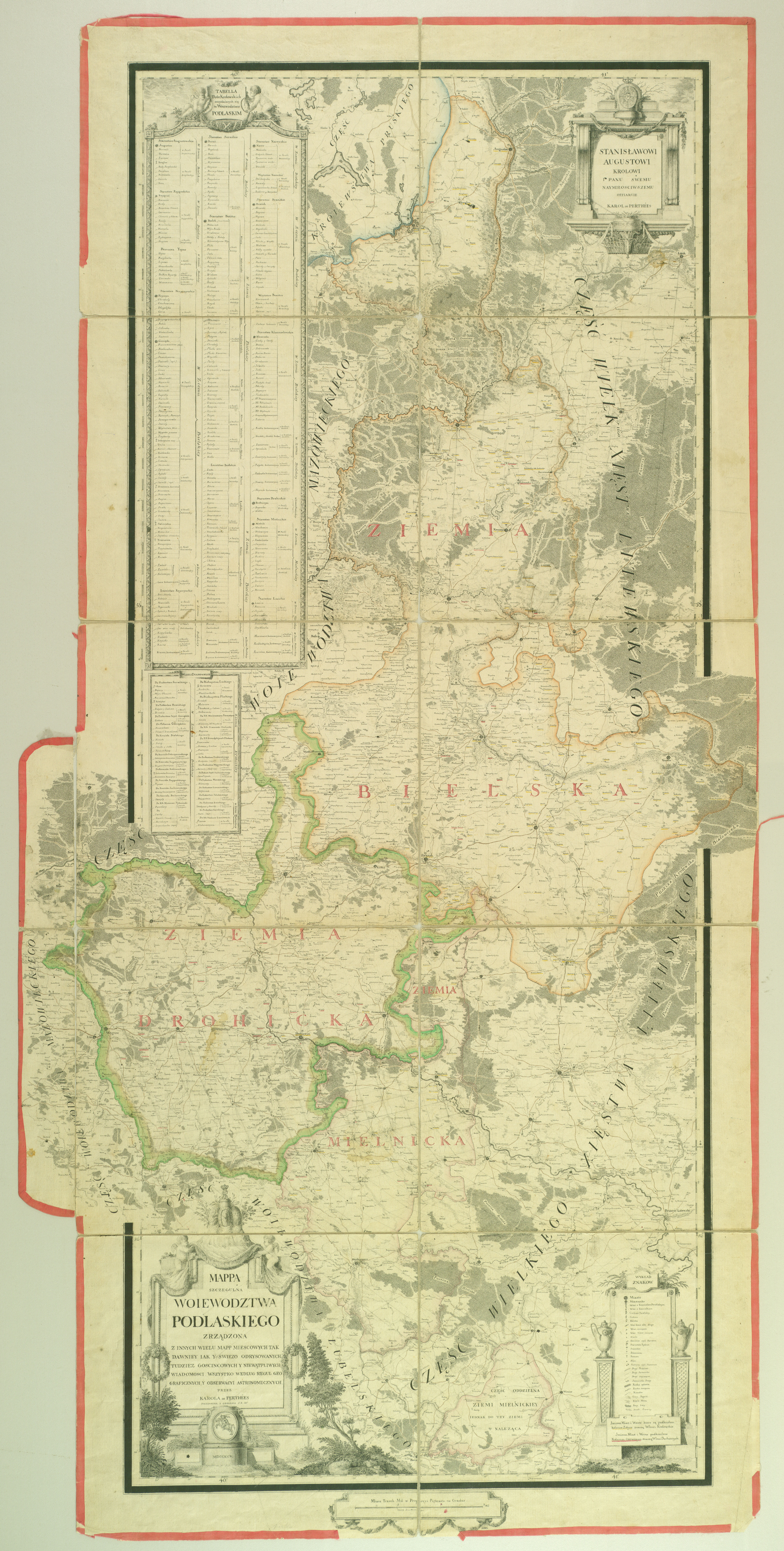
Map of the Podlaskie Voivodeship from 1795

After the administrative reform of 1514, Podlaskie was isolated from Trakai Voivodeship as a separate voivodeship, with the capital at the town of Drohiczyn. King of Poland Sigismund gave a privilege to Ioannes Sapieha to form a government of Podlaskie Voivodeship on 29 August 1513. It originally consisted of the following former Trakai lands: Drohiczyn, Mielnik, Bielsk, and Brest Litovsk. In 1566 based on Brest Litovsk lands, the separate Brest Litovsk Voivodeship was formed.

In 1569, Podlachia was returned to the Kingdom of Poland by the Privilege of restoration of Podlasie land to the Polish Crown.

Knyszyn was the favorite residence of King Sigismund II Augustus, who died there in 1572, ending the reign of the Jagiellonian dynasty in Poland. Polish Renaissance writer Łukasz Górnicki, after his appointment as starost of Tykocin in 1572, resided and wrote many of his works in Lipniki.

Podlaskie Voivodeship was subtracted by extensive royal estates, numerous small estates of the nobility (with the exception of the eastern and southern outskirts) and a dense network of small towns. Petty nobility often cultivated their land on their own, and there were many places where the nobility had no serfs, making certain parts of the voivodeship, according to Polish historian, geographer and ethnographer Zygmunt Gloger, the place with the highest percentage of free agricultural population in Europe in the feudal era. Polish nobles in Podlachia became so numerous that from the 16th century some migrated to other regions, including Lesser Poland and Lithuania, where they often made significant fortunes.

In the 17th and early 18th century, the chief regional royal residence in Podlaskie Voivodeship was Tykocin. In December 1630, King Sigismund III Vasa and his family took shelter there from an epidemic, and in 1633 Władysław IV Vasa also stopped there. In 1653, Podlachia itself was hit by an epidemic. The region was invaded by Sweden during the Deluge, but in 1657, Poles recaptured Tykocin. In 1661, renowned Polish military commander Stefan Czarniecki was granted the Tykocin starostwo with the towns of Tykocin and Białystok as a reward for his military service during the Swedish invasion of Poland of 1655–1660. Two Polish Protestant synods were held in Podlachia, a Calvinist one in Orla in 1644 and a Lutheran one in Węgrów in 1780. Tykocin, whose Old Town is now designated a Historic Monument of Poland, was the place where the Order of the White Eagle, Poland's oldest and highest order, was established.

During the Swedish invasion of Poland of 1701–1706, in 1702, Tykocin was the place of talks between delegates of Poland and Sweden. In 1704, Podlaskie protested against the election of Stanisław Leszczyński as King of Poland. Swedish and Russian troops often passed through the region during the war.

By the 18th century the private town of Białystok became the main center of the region, thanks to the patronage of the Branicki family. Due to the city's palace, parks and edifices, Białystok was dubbed the "Versailles of Podlachia". At that time, Polish kings traveling through Podlachia mainly resided in Białystok, i.e. Augustus II the Strong in 1726 and 1729 and Augustus III of Poland in 1744, 1752 and 1755. The School of Civil and Military Engineering, Poland's first military technical college, and Komedialnia, one of the oldest theaters in Poland, were founded in Białystok in 1745 and 1748, respectively. Białystok was a regional brewing center with 33 breweries as of 1771, with the Podlachian Beer now listed as a protected traditional beverage by the Ministry of Agriculture and Rural Development of Poland.

In 1733, during the War of the Polish Succession, supporters of Augustus III retreated from Warsaw to Węgrów in Podlaskie Voivodeship. In 1767, Jan Klemens Branicki and Wacław Rzewuski protested against the Radom Confederation in Brańsk.

=== Aftermath ===
In the Third Partition of Poland in 1795, most of the voivodeship was taken over by the Kingdom of Prussia as part of New East Prussia, with southern outskirts annexed by Austria, with the Bug forming the border between them. From 1807, these lands were part of the Duchy of Warsaw. Then, parts of it belonged to Congress Poland or the Russian Empire until 1915.

== Administrative Subdivisions ==
The Voivodeship consisted of the following ziemias:

- Bielsk Land (Polish: ziemia bielska), Bielsk). Local sejmiks took place in Bielsk, where the szlachta elected two deputies of the Sejm,
- Drohiczyn Land (Polish: ziemia drohicka), Drohiczyn). Local sejmiks took place in Drohiczyn, electing two deputies of parliament,
- Mielnik Land (Polish: ziemia mielnicka), Mielnik). Local sejmik took place in Mielnik, where two deputies were elected.

== Heraldry ==
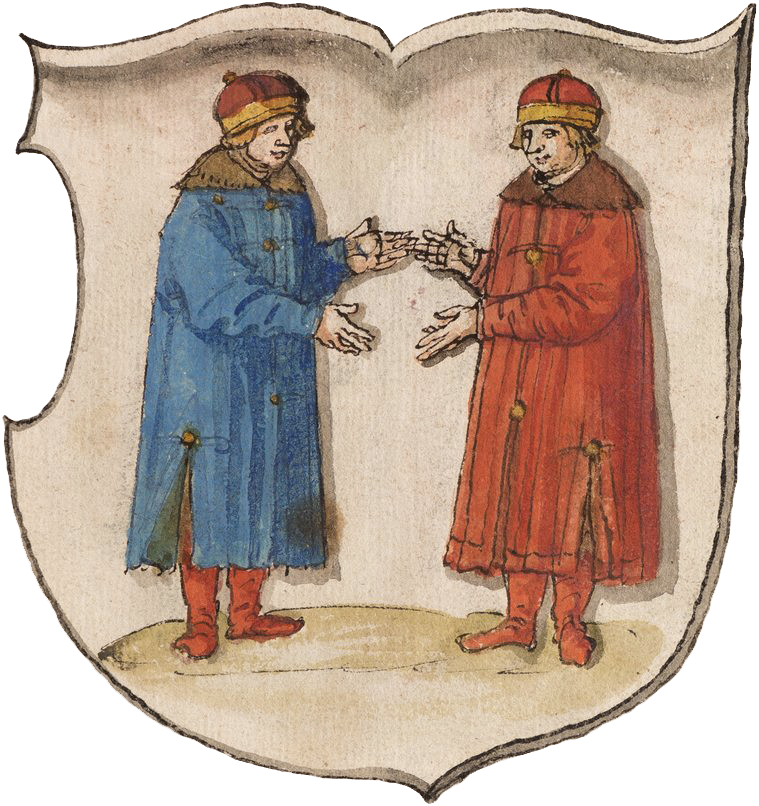
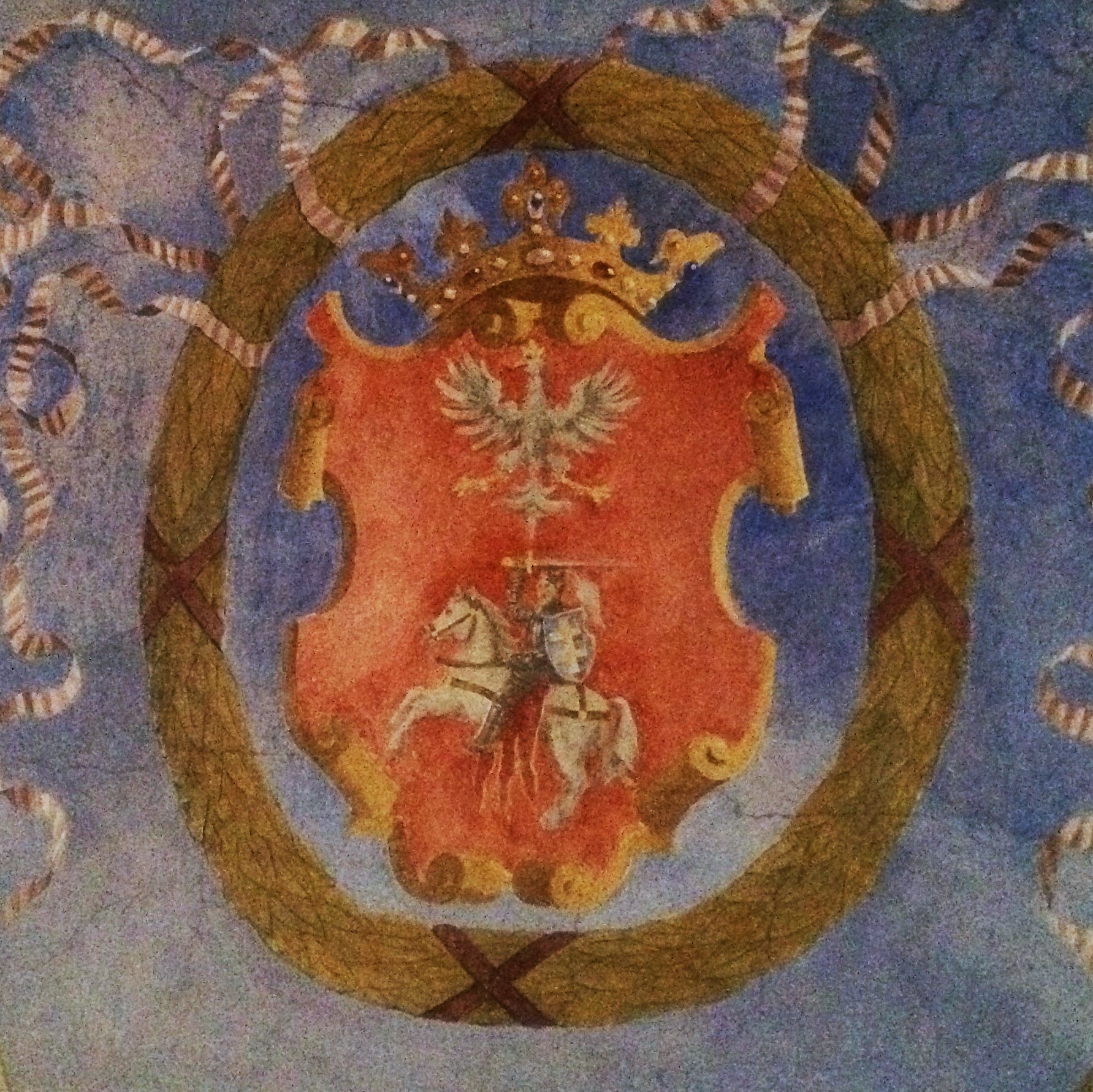
Coat of arms of Podlaskie Voivodship in 1555 and 1720

The coat of arms of the region was created by combining the coats of arms of Poland and Lithuania, i.e. the Piast white eagle albeit without a crown and the Pogoń, a mounted armoured knight holding a sword and shield with the Jagiellonian Double Cross). It was introduced in 1569.

== Cities and towns ==
Cities and towns of the voivodeship after 1566:

=== Bielsk County ===
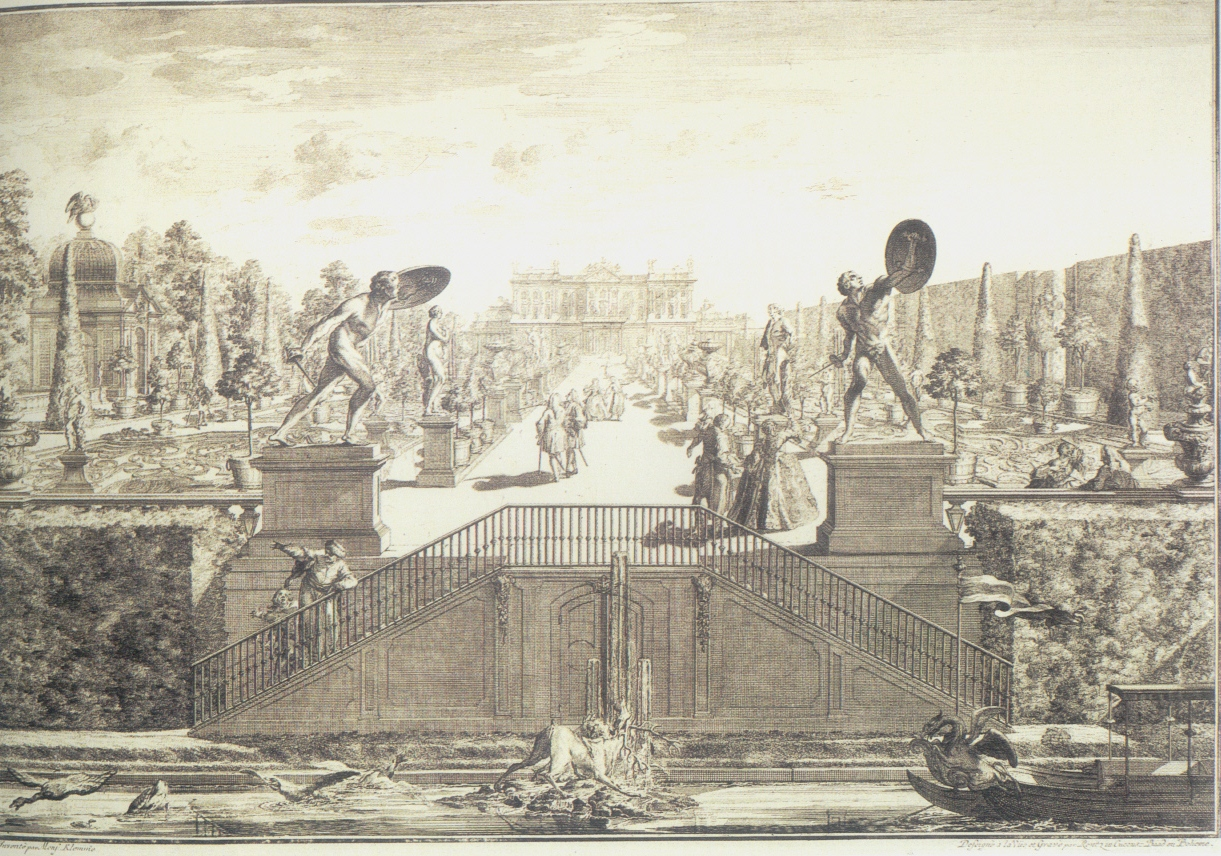
Branicki Palace and garden in Białystok in the 18th century

- Augustów
- Białystok
- Bielsk
- Boćki
- Brańsk
- Goniądz
- Jasionówka
- Kleszczele
- Knyszyn
- Narew
- Orla
- Rajgród
- Suraż
- Trzcianne
- Tykocin
- Waniewo

=== Drohiczyn County ===
- Ciechanowiec
- Drohiczyn
- Kosów Lacki
- Miedzna
- Mokobody
- Mordy
- Siemiatycze
- Skrzeszew
- Sokołów
- Sterdyń
- Węgrów
- Wysokie

=== Mielnik County ===
- Łosice
- Mielnik
- Sarnaki

== Voivodes ==
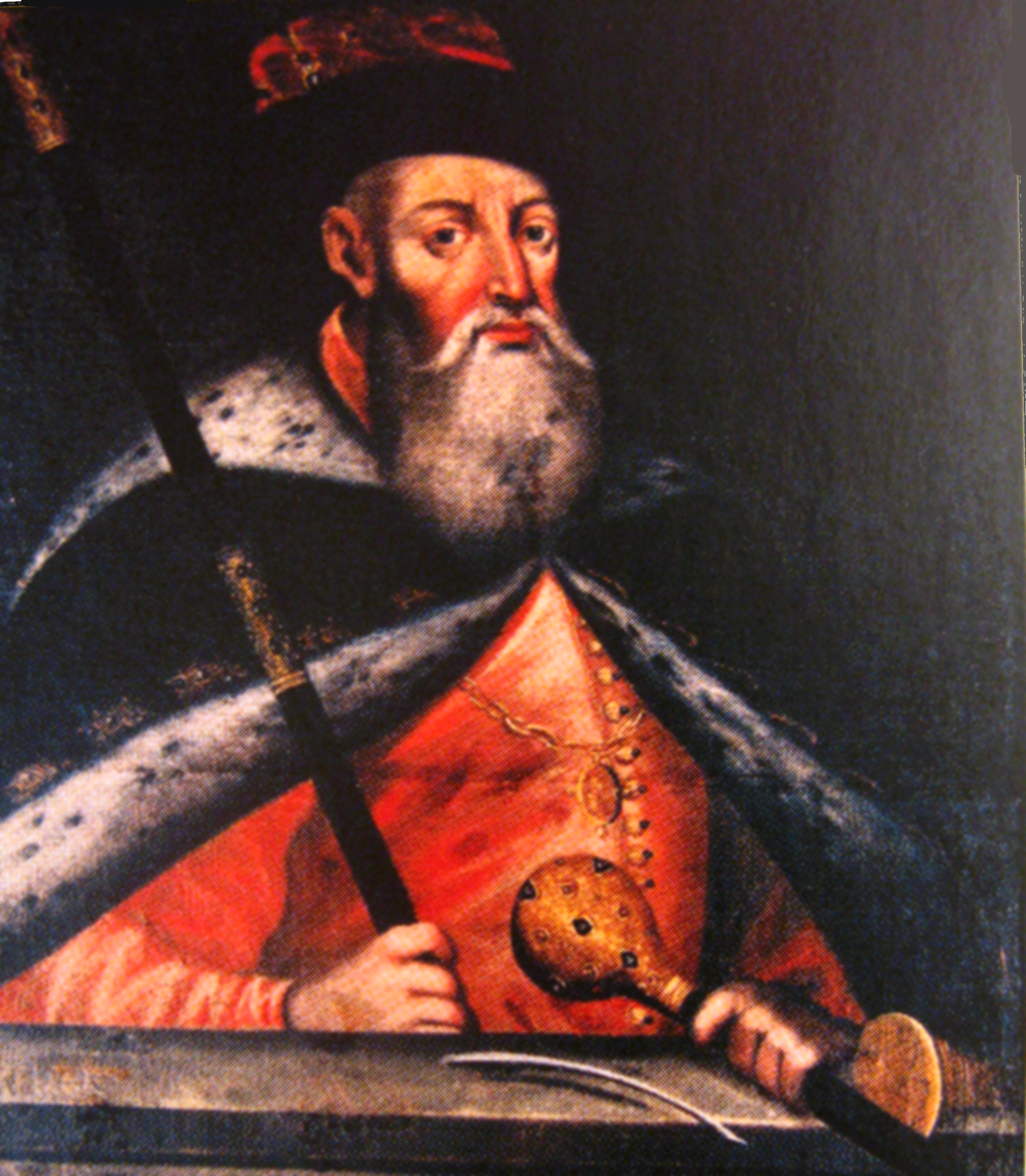
Iwan Sapieha, first Voivode of Podlachia, in 1513–1517

The governor of the Podlaskie Voivodeship was first located in Bielsk Podlaski, but later moved to Drohiczyn.

Voivodes included

- Ioanness Sapieha (ur. ok. 1450, zm. 1517) 1513 – 1517
- Janusz Stankowicz Kostewicz (ur. 1468, zm. 1527) 1520 – 1527
- Ioannes Sapieha (ur. 1486, zm. 1546) 1529 – 1541
- Mikołaj Jurjewicz Pac (ur. 1497, zm. 1551) 1543 – 1551
- Mikołaj Narbutt (zm.1555) 1551 – 1555
- Paweł Iwanowicz Sapieha (zm. 1579) 1555 – 1558, also the Voivode of Smoleńsk
- Bazyli Tyszkiewicz (ur. 1492, zm. 1571) 1558 – 1569, also the Voivode of Smoleńsk
- Mikołaj Kiszka (ur. 1524, zm. 1587) 1569 – 1587
- Stanisław Radzimiński (ur. 1552, zm. 1591) 1588 – 1591
- Janusz Zasławski (ur. 1561, zm. 1629) 1591 – 1604, also the Voivode of Volhynia
- Tomasz Gostomski (ur. 1569, zm. 1623) 1605 – 1605, also the Voivode of Masovia

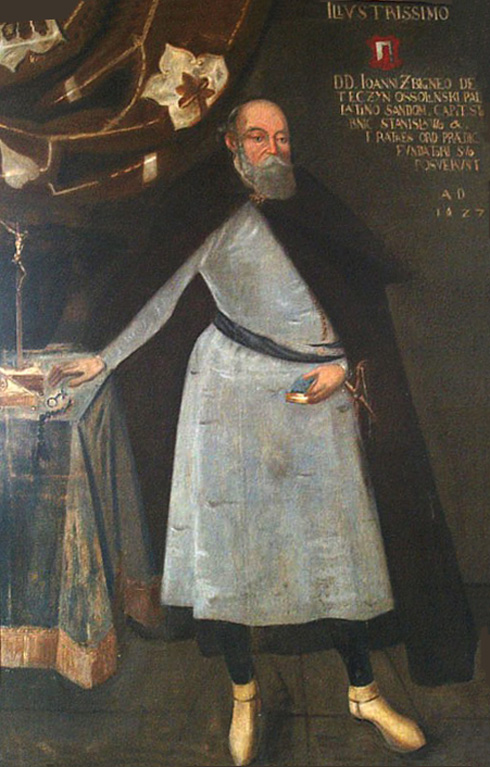
Jan Zbigniew Ossoliński, Voivode in 1605–1613

- Jan Zbigniew Ossoliński (ur. 1555, zm. 1623) 1605 – 1613, also the Voivode of Sandomierz
- Jan Wodyński ( zm. 1616) 1613 – 1616
- Stanisław Warszycki (ur. 1577, zm. 1617) 1616 – 1617
- Wojciech Niemira (zm. 1625) 1617 – 1625
- Andrzej Chądzyński (ur. 1561, zm. 1631) 1625 – 1631
- Paweł Szczawiński (zm. 1634) 1633 – 1634
- Stanisław Niemira (ur. 1597, zm. 1642/48) 1634 – 1648
- Paweł Warszycki (zm. 1660) 1649 – 1652, also the Voivode of Masovia
- Prokop Leśniowolski (ur. 1588, zm. 1653) 1652 – 1653
- Jan Piotr Opaliński (ur. 1601, zm. 1665) 1653 – 1661, also the Voivode of Kalisz
- Wojciech Emeryk Mleczko (ur. ok. 1625, zm. 1673) 1665 – 1673
- Wacław Leszczyński (ur. 1626, zm. 1688) 1673 – 1688
- Marcin Oborski 1688 – 1698
- Stefan Mikołaj Branicki (ur. 1643, zm. 1709) 1699 – 1709

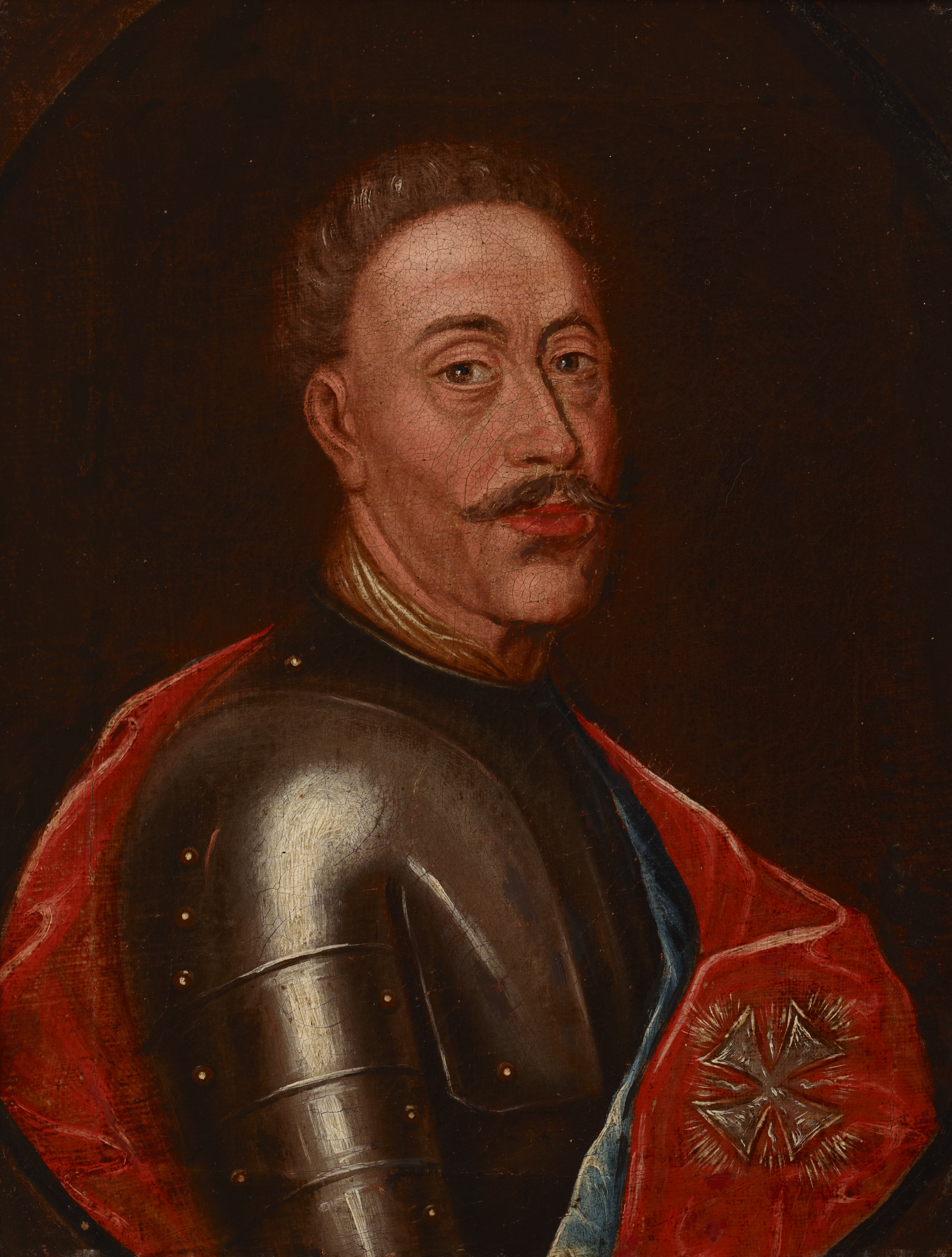
Stanisław Mateusz Rzewuski, Voivode in 1710–1728

- Stanisław Mateusz Rzewuski (ur. 1660, zm. 1728) 1710 – 1728, also the Voivode of Bełz, hetman polny koronny
- Michał Józef Sapieha 1728 – 1738
- Karol Józef Hiacynt Sedlnicki 1738 – 1745, also podskarbi wielki koronny
- Michał Antoni Sapieha (ur. 1711, zm. 1760) 1746 – 1752, also podkanclerzy litewski
- Michał Józef Rzewuski (ur. 1699, zm. 1770) 1752 – 1762
- Bernard Stanisław Gozdzki (ur. 1704, zm. 1771) 1762 – 1771
- Antoni Miączyński (ur. 1691, zm. 1774) 1771 – 1774
- Józef Salezy Ossoliński (ur. 1744, zm. 1797) 1774 – 1790
- Tomasz Aleksandrowicz (ur. 1735, zm. 1794 1790 – 1794

== Bibliography ==
- Gloger, Zygmunt (1900). Geografia historyczna ziem dawnej Polski (in Polish). Kraków.
