= Podlaskie Voivodeship (1816–1837) =

Coordinates: 52°09′54″N 22°16′52″E

The Podlaskie Voivodeship was an Administrative subdivision of Congress Poland in the early 1800s.

It was created in 1816 from the Siedlce Department.

It's capital was in Siedlce.
