= Niemirów, Podlaskie Voivodeship =

Niemirów
- Village
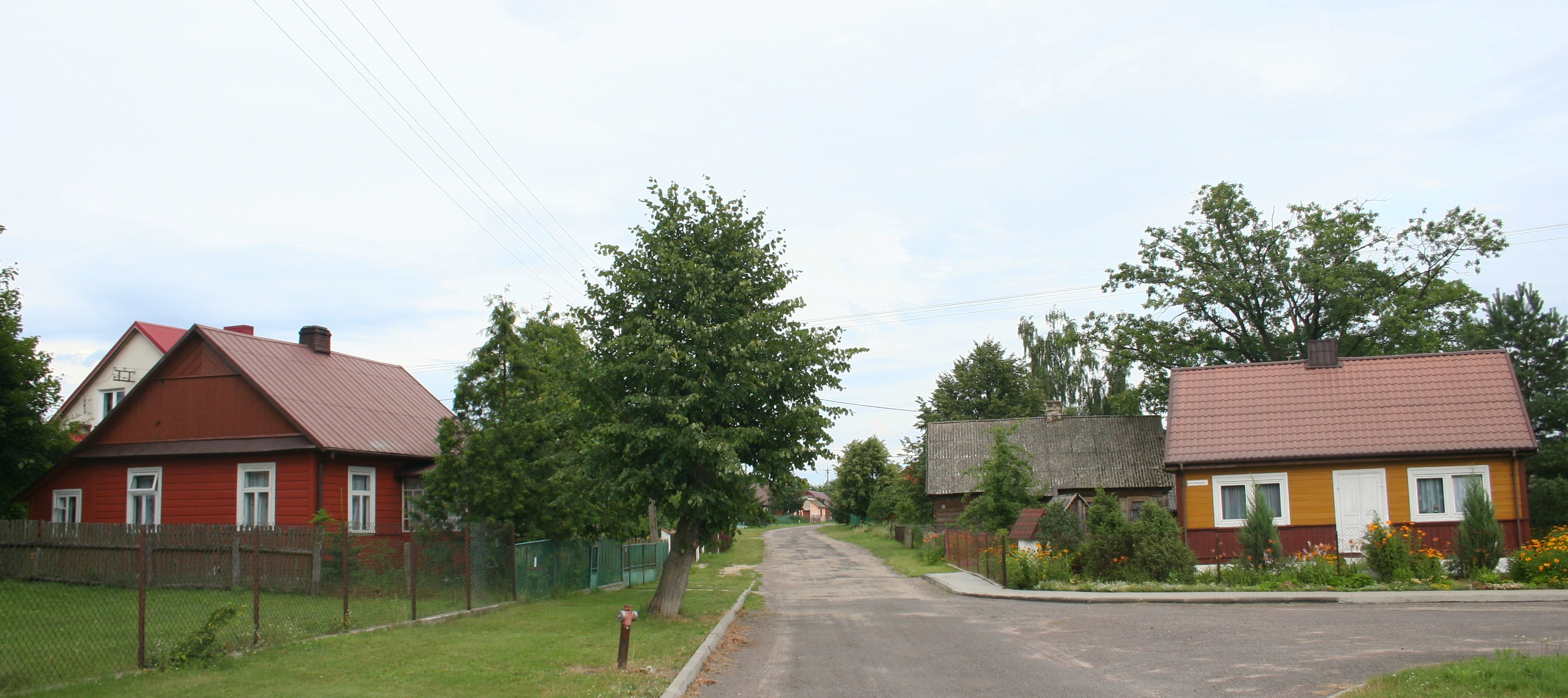

- Location within Poland
- Coordinates: 52°17′11.26″N 23°9′48.93″E
- Country: Poland
- Voivodeship: Podlaskie
- County: Siemiatycze
- Gmina: Mielnik
- Population: 240

Niemirów [ɲɛˈmʲiruf] is a village in the administrative district of Gmina Mielnik, within Siemiatycze County, Podlaskie Voivodeship, in north-eastern Poland, close to the border with Belarus.

The locale's designation derives from the Slavic given name Niemir. The history of Niemirów probably dates back to the 11th century, when a Slavic gord existed here. Archaeological findings proved that both Mazovian and Ruthenian settlers resided here. First documented mention of the village comes from 1495; at that time, it was called Niwice. In 1548, Polish King Zygmunt August handed the village to a nobleman Stanisław Niemira (Gozdawa coat of arms), whose grandson, Castellan of Podlasie Stanisław Niemira, changed the name of the village into Niemirów and granted town charter to it. In 1620, a market square with a parish church were built, and Niemirow was first called a town in documents from 1631. Swedish and Transilvanian invasion of Poland (1655–1660) had catastrophic consequences for the town, as it was completely destroyed, and in 1662 its population was only 88.

The town remained property of the Niemira family until 1738, when it was purchased by the Czartoryski family. Due to efforts of Chancellor of the Polish-Lithuanian Commonwealth in 1755 Niemirów was granted the right for two weekly markets and two annual fairs. In 1795 - 1807, borders of the three partitioning powers met near the town after Third Partition of Poland.

The border between the partitioning powers in the vicinity of Niemirów disappeared in 1807 and in 1815–1915 Niemirów belonged to the Russian Empire, and on February 4, 1863, a skirmish between Russians and Polish rebels took place here, during the January Uprising in order to restore the independence of Poland.

According to the 1921 census, the village was inhabited by 777 people, among whom 557 were Roman Catholic, 71 Orthodox, and 149 Mosaic. At the same time, 591 inhabitants declared Polish nationality, 54 Belarusian and 132 Jewish. There were 120 residential buildings in the village.

In September 1939, Soviet authorities forced most residents to leave the town, as Soviet-German border was established nearby (see Molotov–Ribbentrop Pact). The inhabitants returned to the town in mid-1941, after German invasion of the USSR.

Niemirow, almost completely destroyed during the war, lost town rights in 1944.

Due to the wartime destruction, the village has few points of interest. Niemirow, a former town, has a market square, with some wooden houses. Also, there is St. Stanislaus church, originally built in 1620 to burn down in 1775. New church was built by the Czartoryski family in 1780–1791. In 1866, Russian authorities closed it, and unsuccessfully tried to convert it into an Orthodox church. It was given back to the Catholics in 1905.

Niemirow also has a gate with a bell tower (1823), and near the village there is the so-called Castle Hill, with a medieval gord, which once guarded Bug river crossing. Furthermore, there are concrete bunkers, which were part of the so-called Molotov Line, built by Soviets in 1940–41.
