= Bielsk Land =

Bielsk Land, (Polish: ziemia bielska, named after the town of Bielsk Podlaski, Lithuanian: Bielsko žemė) was an administrative unit (ziemia) of the Grand Duchy of Lithuania, Kingdom of Poland and the Polish–Lithuanian Commonwealth. Created in 1413, it originally belonged to the Lithuanian Trakai Voivodeship. In 1513, it became part of newly created Podlasie Voivodeship, and from 1569 until 1795, it belonged to the Kingdom of Poland.

Bielsk Land had its capital in Bielsk Podlaski, local sejmiks also took place in this town, with two envoys elected to the Sejm in Warsaw. Bielsk Podlaski however was not the largest town of the land, as it was smaller than Bransk, Tykocin and Goniądz.

The Land of Bielsk was created after a merger of territories of three smaller entities:

- the land administered by medieval gords at Bielsk itself and Suraz. Until the mid-14th century, it had been part of the Land of Drohiczyn,
- former Mazovian Castellany of Swiecko, which was seized by Lithuania in the mid-14th century,
- the county of Goniądz, which had been part of Mazovian Land of Wizna. It was captured by the Teutonic Knights, who handed it over to Grand Duke Vytautas. Goniądz County retained some administrative independence, with its own land court.

Altogether, Bielsk Land was the largest of the three lands of Podlasie Voivodeship - it made its northern half, with such towns, as Bielsk, Bransk, Tykocin, Goniądz, Kleszczele, Białystok, Knyszyn, Choroszcz, Rajgród, Narew, Augustowo, Orla, Boćki and Jasionowka.

Bielsk Land had two starostas – those of Knyszyn and Tykocin.

== Sources ==
- Z. Gloger, Dawna ziemia bielska i jej cząstkowa szlachta. Warsaw 1873
