= Dziennik Departamentowy Łomżyński =

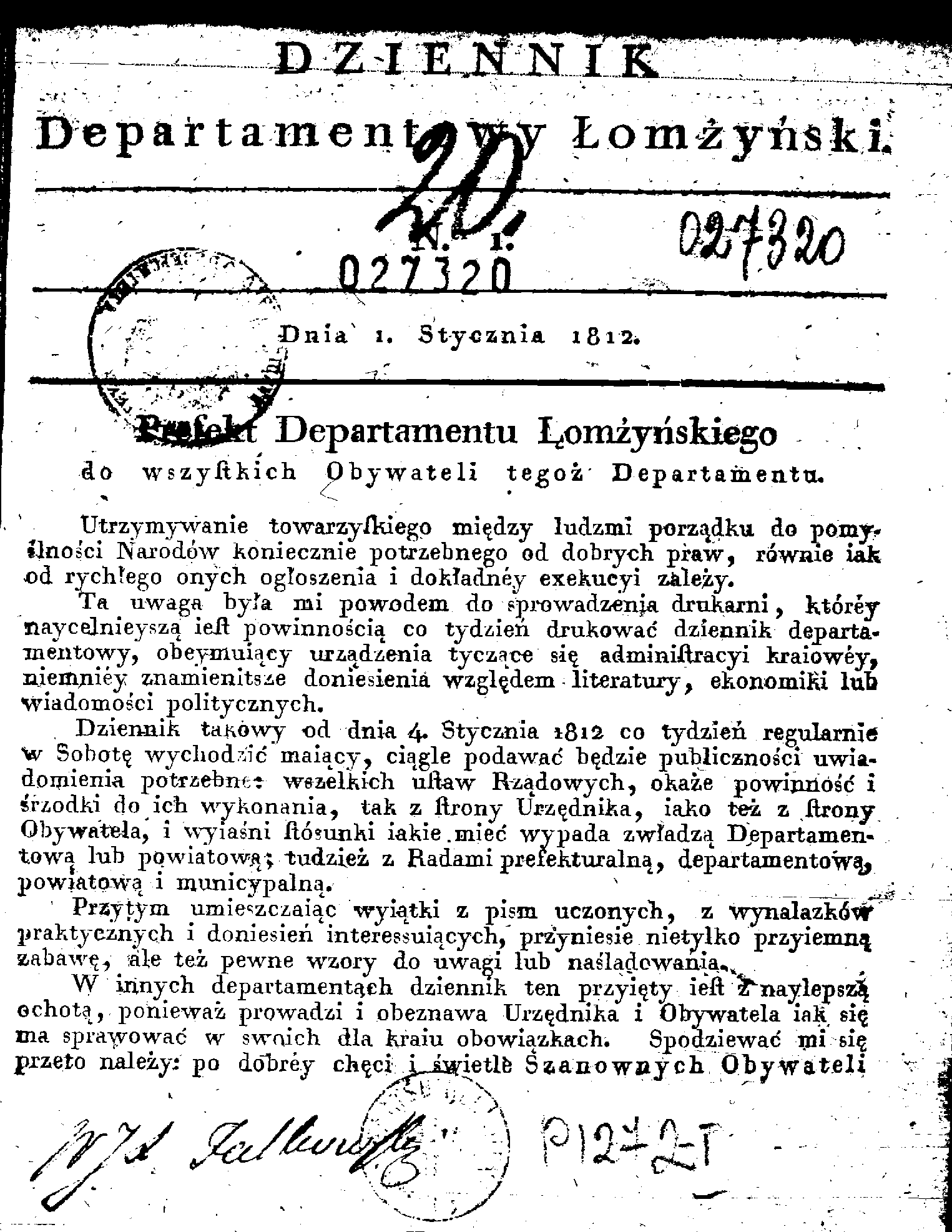
- Cover page of the first issue
- Frequency: Weekly
- First issue: 1813
- Final issue: 1816
- Company: Prefect of the Łomza Department
- Country: Duchy of Warsaw
- Language: Polish
- OCLC: 749519099

Dziennik Departamentowy Łomżyński (lit. Łomża Department Daily) was an official periodical published and printed in Łomża during the Duchy of Warsaw.

== History ==
The originator and founder of the magazine was Count Jan Lasocki who was also the founder and creator of the Łomża Department. On the 30 December 1811 he issued a prefectural device in respect of the departmental gazette, addressed to all sub-prefects discussing the rules for its publication. In order to publish the journal, he brought to Łomża from Płock a printing press from Antoni Lentecki.

It was intended to be a weekly newspaper to be published every Saturday, with a volume of one to one and a half sheets. The final number of pages ranged from 4 to 16 The first issue appeared on 1 January 1812, the last on 19 December 1812. When publication of the journal resumed on October 15, 1815, the title was changed to Official Gazette of the Łomża Department (Polish: Dziennik Urzędowy Departamentu Łomżyńskiego). The last issue under this title appeared on 21 September 1816.

In the course of numbering the journal (under no. 53), the only issue of the Augustów Voivodship Journal (Polish: Dziennika Województwa Augustowskiego) was published on 28 September 1816, which contained information about the transition from prefectural to provincial administration and a farewell from the outgoing prefect of Łomża.

After the liquidation of the Łomża Department and the creation of the Augustów Voivodship from its territory, the Official Gazette of the Augustów Voivodship took over the role of the official journal.

== Contents ==
The content of the applicable law (e.g. government laws, administrative, judicial and fiscal devices) with an interpretation of its implementation was published. Private individuals had the opportunity to publish notices upon payment of the appropriate fee. Over time, excerpts from literary works were also published, historical texts or descriptions of festivities (e.g. celebrations of Napoleon Bonaparte's birthday).The Journal also published handbills or exchange rate charts.

== Price ==
The cost of the subscription was 16 zloty spread over quarterly instalments of 4 zlotys each, payable in advance. Subscribed issues were to be sent from Łomża to the county town or to the post office nearest to the subscribers.

== See also ==
- Duchy of Warsaw
- Łomża Department
