= New East Prussia =

Province of the Kingdom of Prussia (1795-1807)

Province of New East Prussia Provinz Neuostpreußen (German)
- Province of Kingdom of Prussia
- 1795–1807
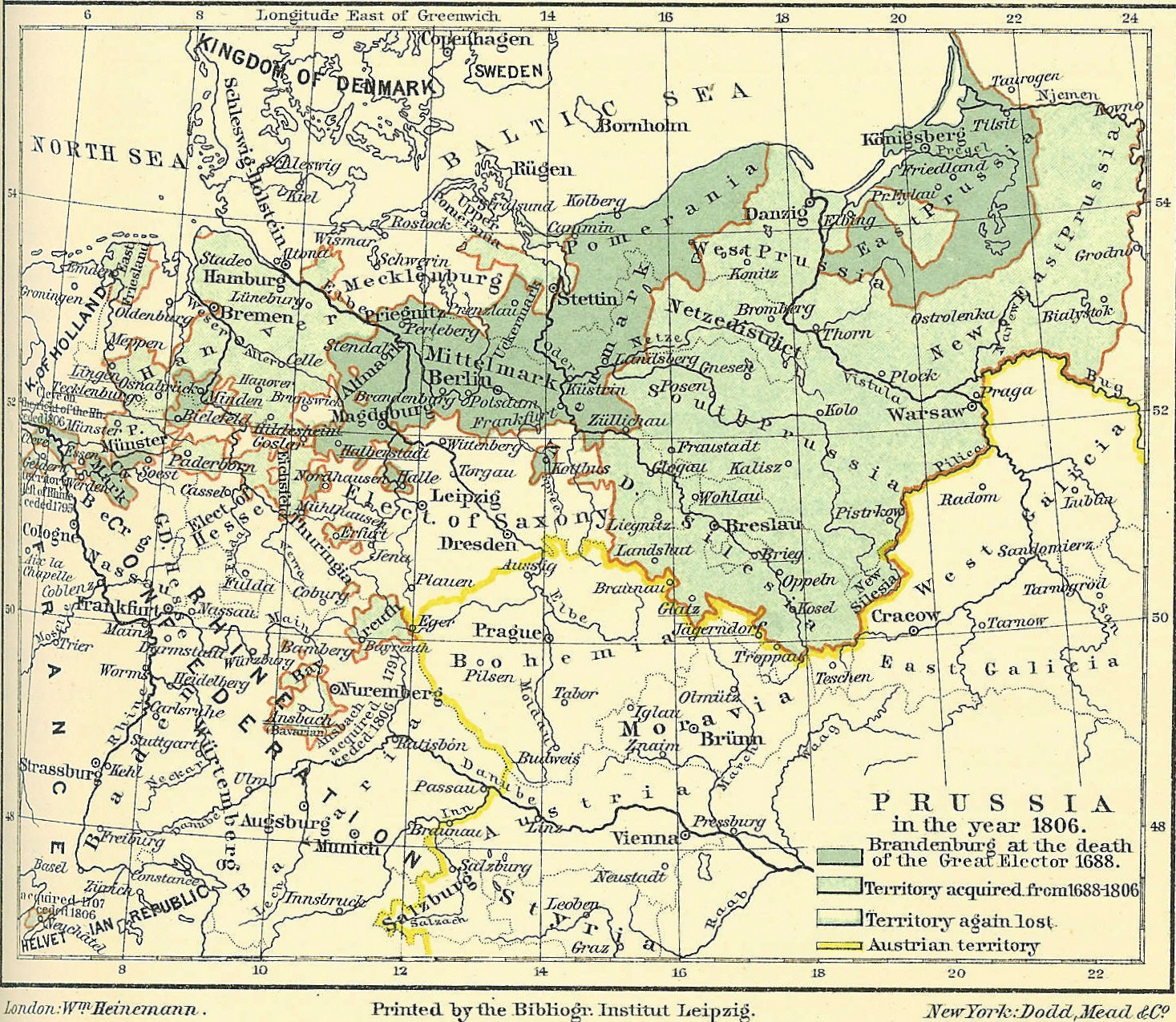
- New East Prussia in 1806
- Capital: Białystok
- Area
  - 1806: 55,000 km^{2} (21,000 sq mi)
- Population
  - 1806: 914,610
- History
  - Third Partition: 24 October 1795
  - Treaty of Tilsit: 9 July 1807
- Political subdivisions: Bialystok; Plozk
Preceded by
Masovian Voivodeship (1526–1795)
Podlaskie Voivodeship (1513–1795)
Trakai Voivodeship
Succeeded by
Duchy of Warsaw
Russian Empire
- Today part of: Poland; Lithuania; Belarus¹
- ¹ Sopoćkinie area

New East Prussia (German: Neuostpreußen; Polish: Prusy Nowowschodnie; Lithuanian: Naujieji Rytprūsiai) was a province of the Kingdom of Prussia from 1795 to 1807. It was created out of territory annexed in the Third Partition of the Polish–Lithuanian Commonwealth and included parts of Masovia, Podlaskie, Trakai voivodeship and Žemaitija. In 1806 it had 914,610 inhabitants with a territory of less than 55,000 km^{2} (21,000 sq mi), mainly Poles, Lithuanians, Jews and Belarusians.

== Geography ==
New East Prussia encompassed territory between East Prussia and the Vistula, Bug, and Memel rivers.

== 1807 Treaties of Tilsit ==
Following Napoleon Bonaparte's victory in the War of the Fourth Coalition and the Greater Poland Uprising of 1806 the Province of New East Prussia was ceded according to the 1807 Treaties of Tilsit:

- The area around Białystok was ceded to the Russian Empire, becoming the Belostok Oblast.
- The Płock Department and the remainder of the Białystok Department (Łomża Department) became part of the Duchy of Warsaw, a French client state.

== Administrative divisions ==
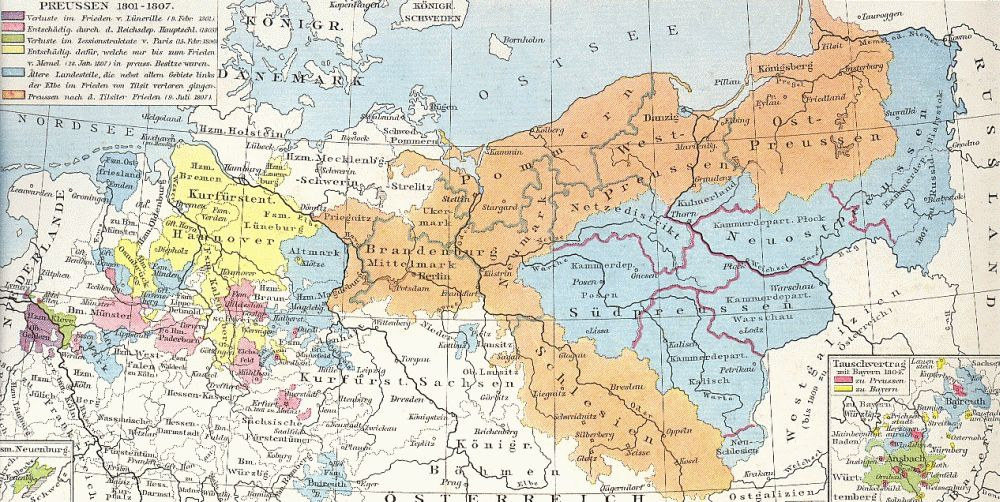
New East Prussia (Neuostpreußen) and the Departments of Płock and Bialystok, 1801–1807

New East Prussia was divided into the Kammerdepartements of Bialystok and Płock which were divided into the following Kreise (districts):

- Białystok Department
  - Bialystok
  - Bielsk
  - Bobrz
  - Dombrowa
  - Drohiczyn
  - Kalwary
  - Lomza
  - Mariampol
  - Surasz
  - Wygry
- Płock Department
  - Lipno
  - Mlawa
  - Ostrolenka
  - Plozk
  - Przasnik
  - Pultusk
  - Wyszogrod
