= Wasilków =

Town in Podlaskie Voivodeship, Poland

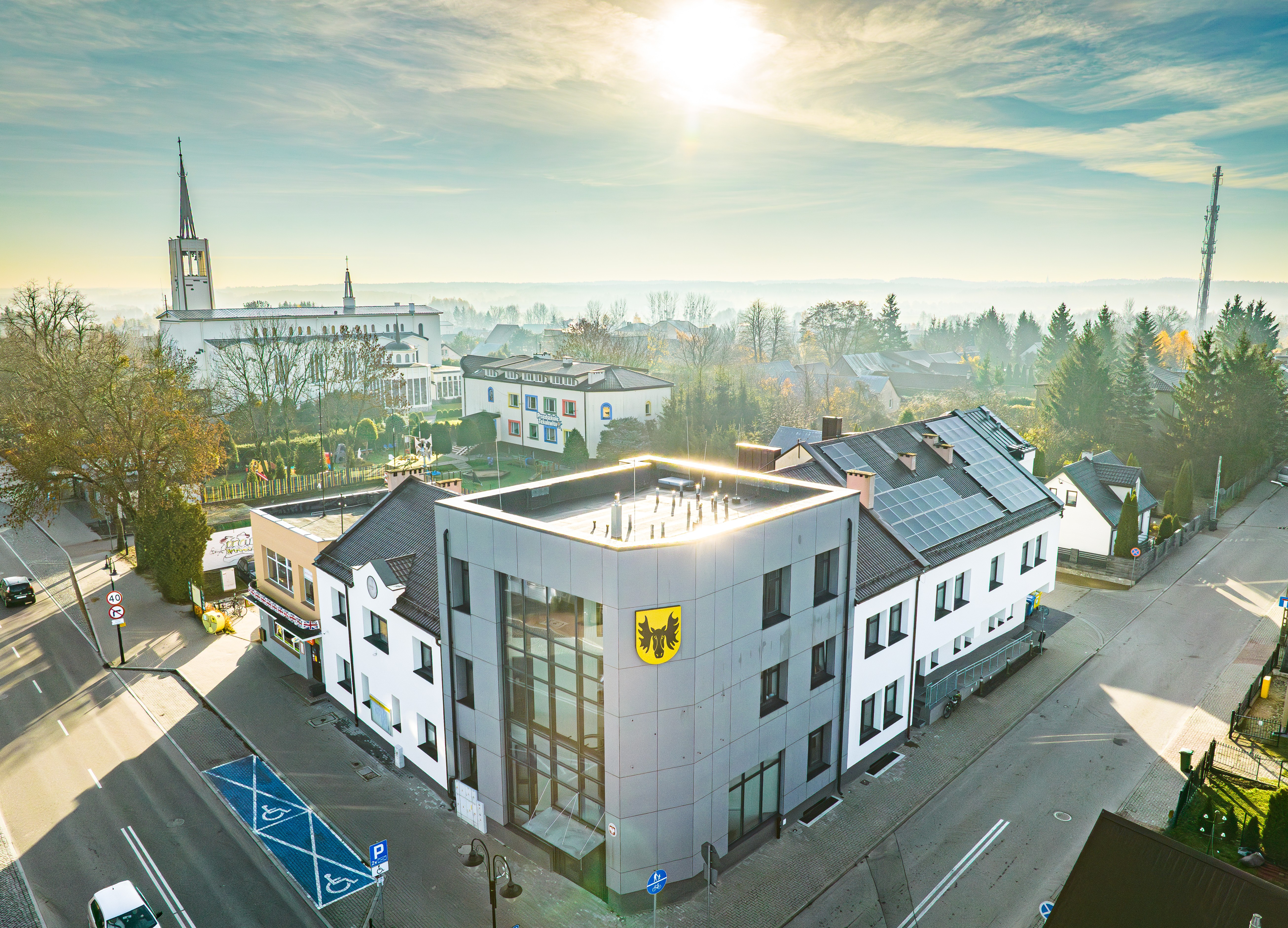
- Town Hall in Wasilków

- Flag Coat of arms

- Location within Poland
- Coordinates: 53°12′18″N 23°12′16″E
- Country: Poland
- Voivodeship: Podlaskie
- County: Białystok
- Gmina: Wasilków

Area
  - Total: 28.15 km^{2} (10.87 sq mi)

Population (2024)
  - Total: 12,831
  - Density: 455.8/km^{2} (1,181/sq mi)
- Time zone: UTC+1 (CET)
  - Summer (DST): UTC+2 (CEST)
- Postal code: 16-010
- Website: http://www.wasilkow.pl/

Wasilków [vaˈɕilkuf] is a town in north-eastern Poland, in Białystok County, in Podlaskie Voivodeship, about 3 km (2 mi) north of Białystok, with 12,831 inhabitants (2024). It is a northern suburb of Białystok within the Białystok metropolitan area, situated on the Supraśl River.

== History ==
The first traces of settlement in the Wasilków commune date back to the Middle Stone Age. Excavations conducted near the town of Nowodworce provided evidence of the settlement of these areas in the Bronze Age, which lasted in Poland until around 1800 BCE. One of the most interesting was the discovery of a flint mine in the Knyszyn Forest near Rybniki. As a result of the research, about fifty archaeological sites have been discovered in the commune. Traces of prehistoric and early-historic settlements have been found in the vicinity of almost every modern village in the Wasilków commune. However, nothing is known about the beginnings of Slavic settlement in Wasilków.

=== Early history ===
In the 11th century the territory of Wasilków belonged to Kievan Rus. In 1340, the area of Wasilkow was incorporated into Lithuania by Duke Gediminas. However, earlier this area belonged to Mazovia within fragmented Piast-ruled Poland. The first mention in written sources about the area where the town and the Wasilków starosty was later established in 1358.

A breakthrough date in the history of Wasilków is December 8, 1566, when King Sigismund II Augustus granted town rights and a coat of arms. The town was inhabited by people from the vicinity of Goniądz, Tykocin and Białystok. Two days after granting town rights - on December 10, 1566, King Sigismund II Augustus issued a privilege allowing the creation of a Catholic parish.

In the middle of the 17th century Wasilków was inhabited by about 500 people, and the entire starosty additionally 400 people. The first records from this period appear about Jews who came from Choroszcz and settled in Wasilków. Before the First Partition of Poland, Wasilków had about 1,500 inhabitants. After the Third Partition of Poland, Wasilków was incorporated into the Białystok Department of New East Prussia, and from 1807, under the Treaty of Tylża, into the Russian Partition of Poland.

=== Late modern period ===
Around 1880, Wasilków had 3,880 inhabitants. There were 12 textile factories in the town, ten of which were owned by Jews. All plants employed a total of about 300 people.

The tragic date in the history of the town is May 5, 1895, when a great fire destroyed almost half of Wasilków, and 10 people died in the fire. At the end of the 19th century, Wasilków had approx. 4,000 inhabitants. residents.

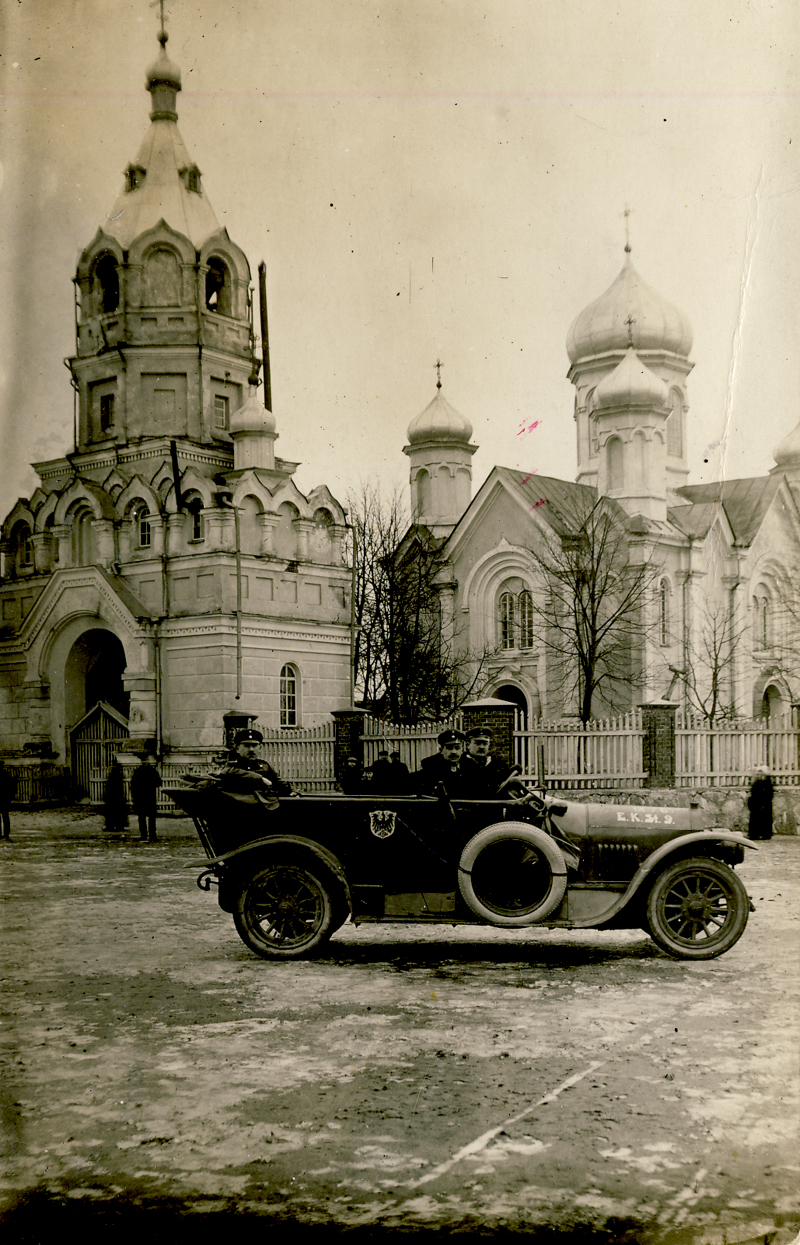
German occupying forces in Wasilków during World War I

In November 1918, there were only two textile factories operating in the town, employing nearly 70 workers. In the 1921 census, 85.8% people declared Polish nationality, and 13.2% declared Jewish nationality.

During the German-Soviet invasion of Poland, which started World War II, Wasilków was first occupied by the German army on September 16, 1939, and less than a week later, a cavalry detachment of the Soviet Red Army entered the town, and Soviet occupation began. Several dozen of Wasilków families were deported to Kazakhstan. Several local Polish policemen, including the police chief, and an elementary school principal were murdered by the Russians in the Katyn massacre in 1940. From 1941 to 1944, the town was occupied by Germany. In August 1941, the Germans established a ghetto in Wasilków, in which about 1,250 Jews were held. The following year, they were taken to Treblinka, where they were murdered.

As a result of the war, the industry in Wasilków ceased to exist. The town was destroyed in 20%. In the post-war period, a significant date is July 1, 1947, when Father Wacław Rabczyński was appointed vicar and administrator of the parish under the invocation of Transfiguration of the Lord in Wasilków. The summary of the activities of Fr. Rabczyński began in 1958 and completed in 1966 the construction of the church of Of the Blessed Virgin Mary, Mother of Mercy at Kościuszko Street. Father Wacław Rabczyński was undoubtedly one of the most outstanding figures in the post-war history of the Wasilkow region.

In 1946 Wasilków had 3,948 inhabitants. The determinant of the changes taking place in the post-war years was the development of Emilia Plater Wool Industry Plant, which in its heyday employed about 2,500 employees. In 1959, the construction of an elementary school on Mickiewicza Street began, and in 1982 a primary school on Polna Street, which was officially opened on May 22, 1985.

After World War II, Wasilków became a satellite town of Białystok. On May 27, 1990, the first half-century free and democratic elections to local self-government took place.

On December 10, 2021, the Wasilków Municipality Bugle Call, composed by Adam Wolański, was established by resolution of the Wasilków Municipal Council. The bugle call is played publicly from the Wasilków Municipal Office building every day at 11:58 a.m. using sound-emitting devices.

== History of mayors ==
Municipal authorities
From	To	Name	Function
1569	NO DATA	Walenty Ślepowron	MAYOR
1668	1668	Maciej Huryłowicz	MAYOR
1668	1668	Wojciech Grotkowski	MAYOR
1669	NO DATA	Andrzej Kożuchowski	MAYOR
1866	NO DATA	Michał Poznański	MAYOR
1914	NO DATA	Feliks Radziszewski	MAYOR
1918	NO DATA	Meszka Szternfeld	MAYOR
1920	1924	Dominik Sobolewski	Mayor
1925	1926	Stanisław Winciorek	Mayor
1926	1929	Izydor Godlewski	Mayor
1929	1932	Michał Godlewski	Mayor
1932	1934	Mr. Rogowski	Mayor
1934	NO DATA	Józef Grabowski	Mayor
1944	1945	Michał Godlewski	Mayor
1945	1945	Stanisław Zawadzki	Mayor
1946	1947	Władysław Matyszewski	Mayor
1947	1947	Stefan Dawidziuk	Mayor
1947	1947	Jan Żukowski	Acting Mayor
1947	1950	Stanisław Baturo	Mayor
1950	1953	Mikołaj Grygorczuk	Chairman of the Municipal National Council
1953	1953	Marian Sadowski	Chairman of the Municipal National Council
1953	1954	Jan Sańczyk	Chairman of the Municipal National Council
1954	1955	Eryk Kopała	Chairman of the Municipal National Council
1955	1968	Kazimierz Jurgielaniec	Chairman of the Municipal National Council
1968	1969	Szymon Szatyłowicz	Chairman of the Municipal National Council
1969	1971	Teodor Sadowski	Chairman of the Municipal National Council
1971	1972	Jerzy Sawicki	Chairman of the Municipal National Council
1973	1982	Eugeniusz Sawicki	The head appointed by the voivode
1982	1990	Galina Dondziło	The head appointed by the voivode
1990	1993	Józef Bychowski	Mayor
1993	2014	Antoni Pełkowski	Mayor
2014	2018	Mirosław Bielawki	Mayor
2018	NOW	Adrian Łuckiewicz	Mayor

== Monuments ==
=== Church of the Blessed Virgin Mary, Mother of Mercy ===
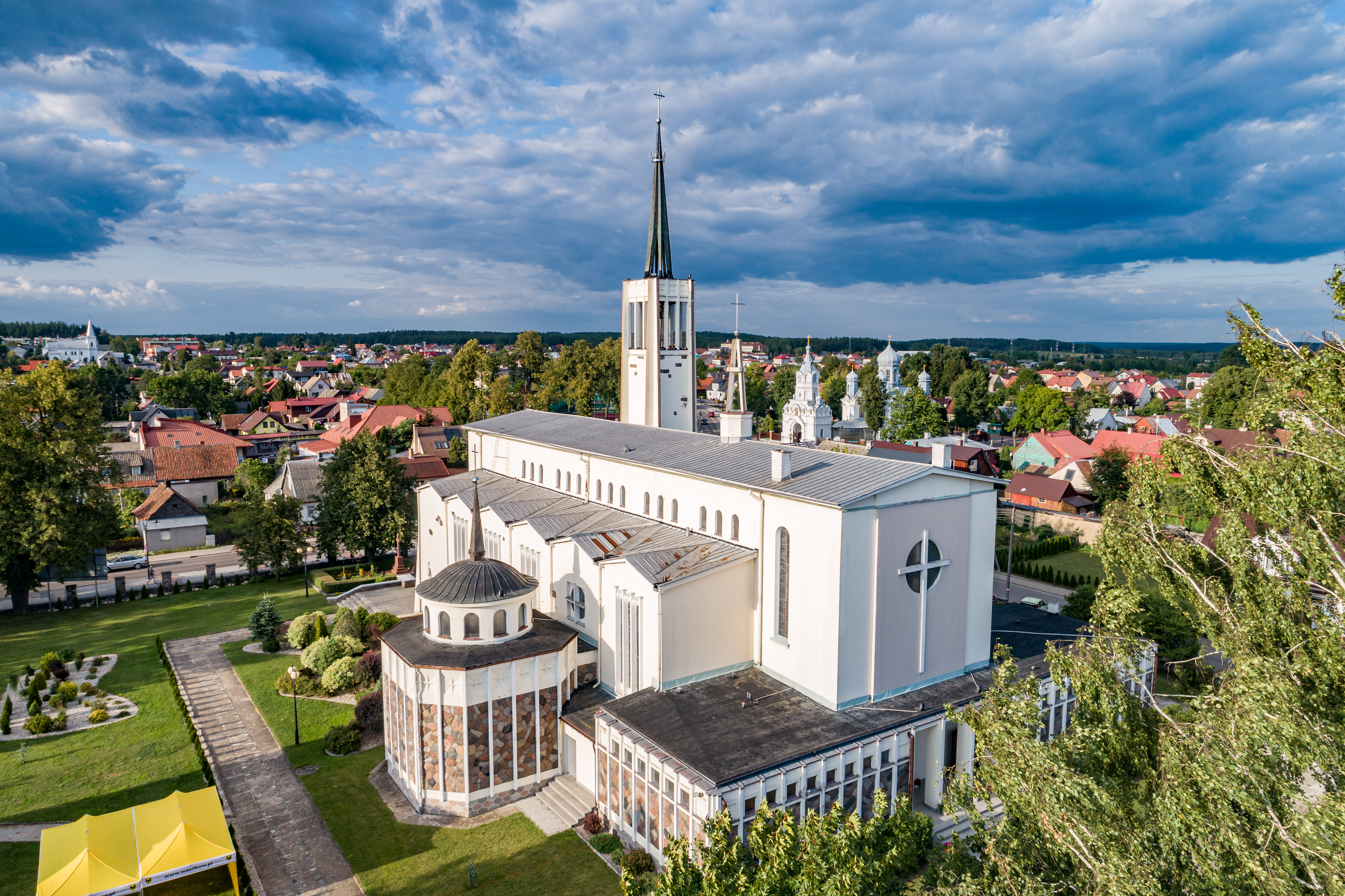
Church of Blessed Virgin Mary, Our Lady of Mercy

The construction of the church was completed in 1966 thanks to the efforts of Fr. Wacław Rabczyński. The previous church, which was demolished in 1867 by the tsarist authorities, was situated in the same place. The building combines the styles of old Christian and modernist architecture. In the middle of the church there is an altar, in line with the changes introduced to the liturgy by the Second Vatican Council. Since 2015, the International Festival of Organ and Chamber Music has been held here every year.

=== Orthodox church of Saints Peter and Paul ===
The five-dome, brick church was built in the mid-nineteenth century and consecrated in 1853 by the Bishop of Brzeg, Ignacy. In 1857, a free-standing, brick belfry was built in the style of the church, which also serves as a gate. In 1867, the church was partially burnt. The following year, after being struck by lightning, it burned down completely. Reconstruction ended in 1875.

=== Church of Transfiguration of the Lord ===
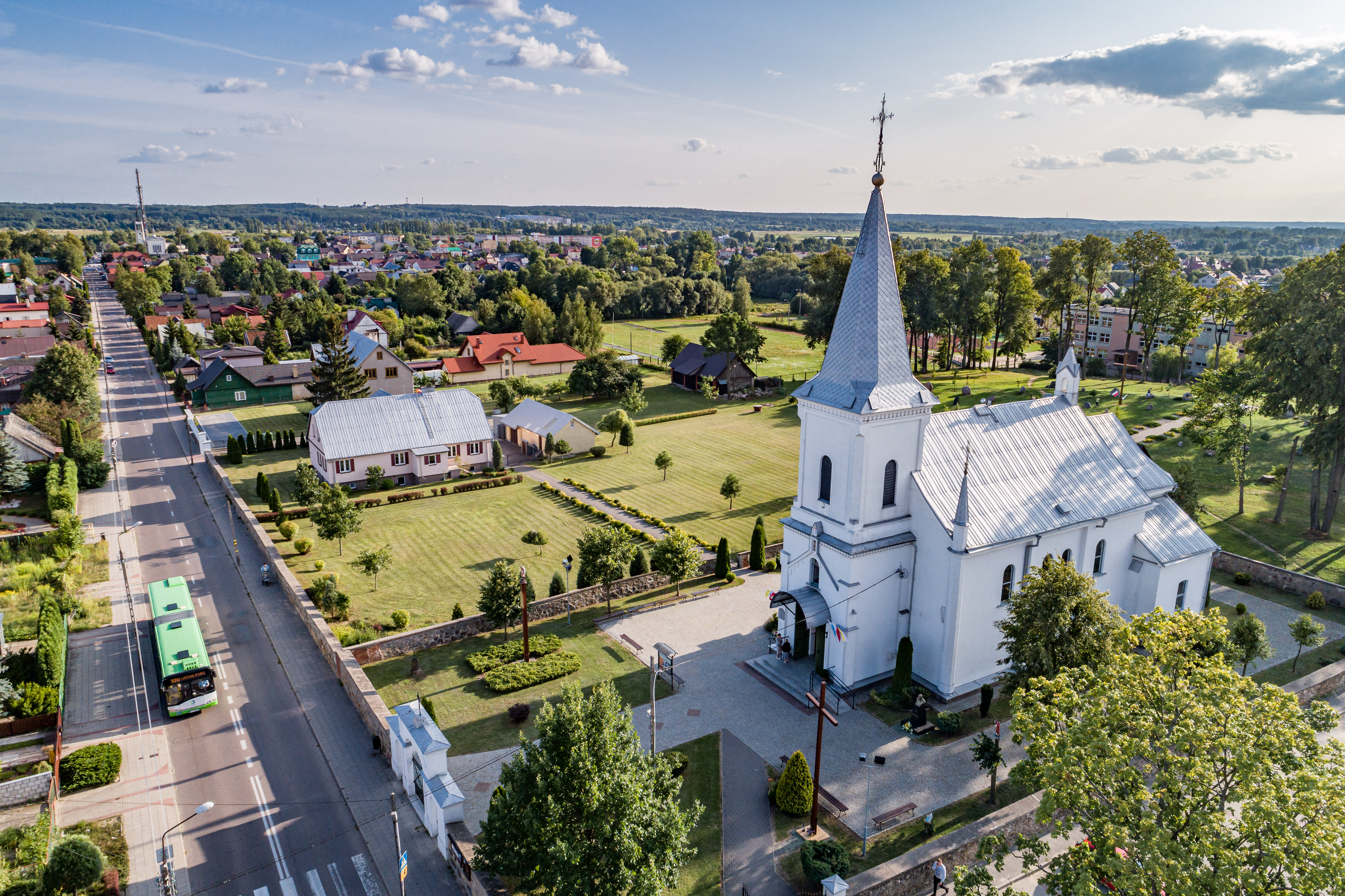
Church of Transfiguration of the Lord

The beginnings of the parish are closely related to the granting of town rights to the settlement of Wasilków by king Zygmunt August on December 8, 1556. Two days after this event, the king issued a foundation document under which a wooden temple in Wasilków was erected. The first temple was built on the so-called "Kościelisko" - on the hill behind the present church. The modern brick neo-baroque church was built in 1883.

=== Roman Catholic cemetery ===
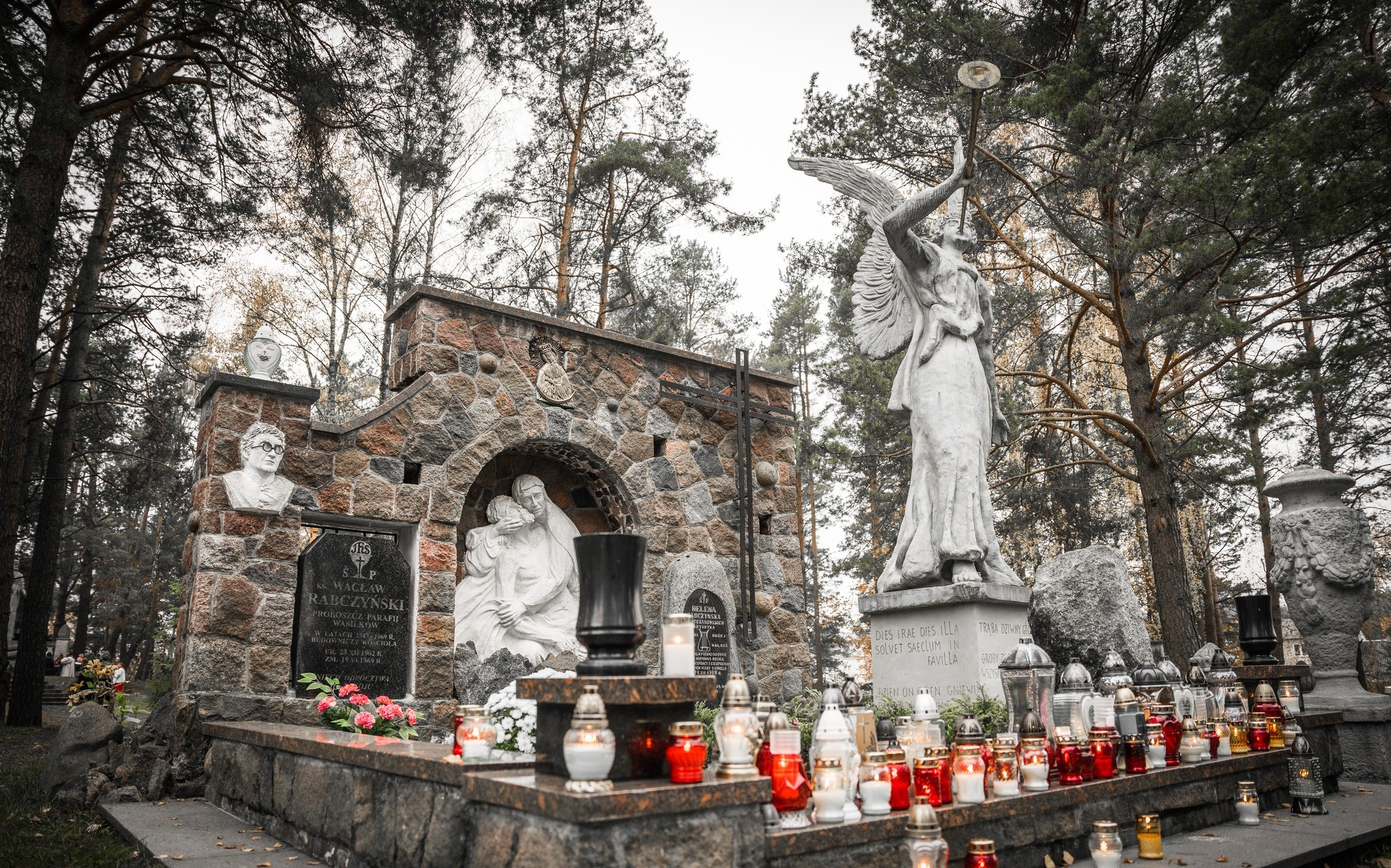
Roman Catholic cemetery

The oldest tombstones in the cemetery come from the end of the 19th century. The decor of the cemetery is rich in details of small architecture: turrets, terraces and miniatures of ancient temples. Hilly terrain with dignified old trees additionally enhances the aesthetic value of this place.

In the cemetery there are seven groups of sculptures referring to the Passion and Resurrection of Jesus, two fountains and about sixty historic tombstones, the oldest of which is from 1896. There are also statues of angels, gates, balustrades and walls with engraved verses from the Holy Scriptures.

At the entrance to the cemetery there is a tombstone of Fr. Wacław Rabczyński, who with his hard work contributed to the construction of the Church of the Blessed Virgin Mary, Mother of Mercy in 1958-1966, as well as the chapel with accompanying facilities in Święta Woda. Thanks to him, unusual cemetery sculptures were created

In 2002, the Wasilków cemetery was entered into the register of monuments. For many years, the Society of the Friends of the Wasilkow Region has carried out fundraising activities for the renovation of historic figures in the cemetery.

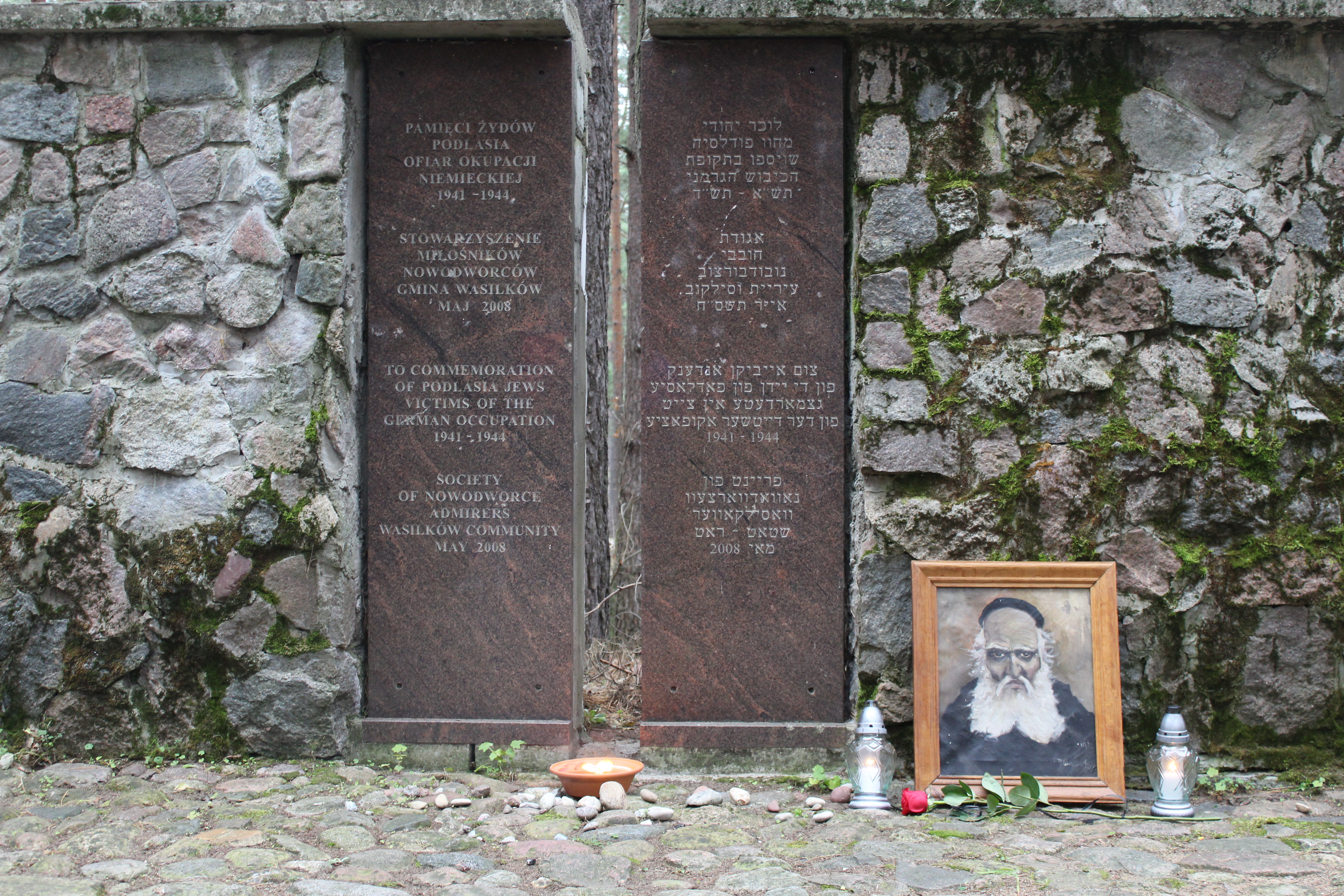
Jewish cemetery

=== Jewish cemetery ===
It was established at the end of the 19th century. A dozen or so matzevot have survived to this day, but there are probably more of them under a thick layer of earth. Metal stars of David have been placed in the place of the entrance gate.

In June 2007, a stone path and a lapidarium were made in the cemetery commemorating the Jews who lived in Wasilków before World War II. For the construction of the monument, found fragments of matzevot.

The first Jews settled in Wasilków in 1650. They came from the nearby Choroszcz and in 1714 established an independent Jewish community. At the end of the 19th century, as many as 1,470 people lived in the town of 3,800 inhabitants of the Jewish faith. About a thousand of them lived here before World War II. The cemetery is a special, historical place that honors the victims of the German occupation and attracts followers of all religions.

=== Sanctuary of Our Lady of Sorrows "Holy Water" ===
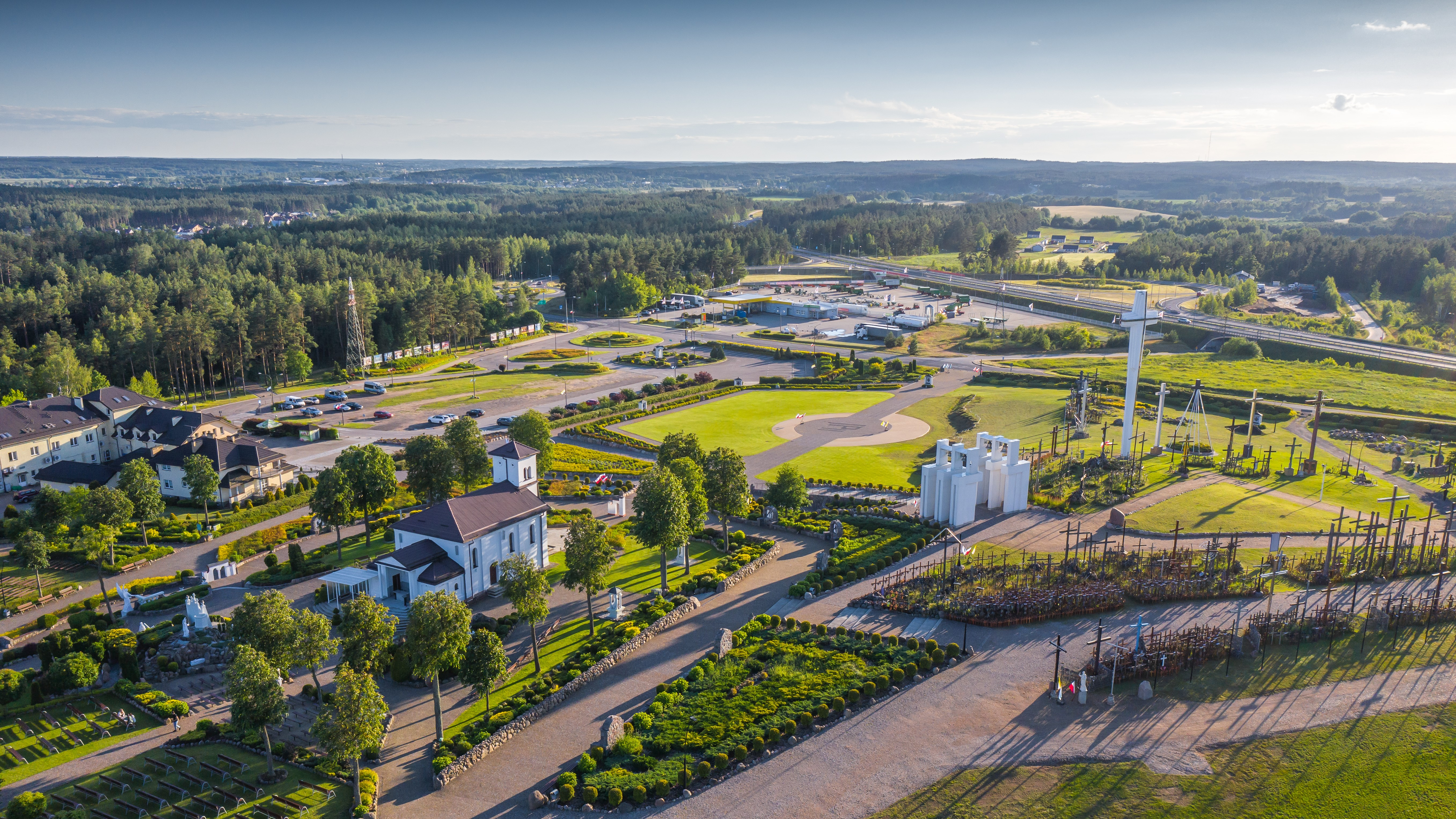
Sanctuary of Our Lady of Sorrows "Święta Woda" in Wasilków

On the outskirts of Wasilków - by the national road No. 19 - there is the "Holy Water" Sanctuary. It owes its name to the spring around which there are many legends related to healing dating back to the Middle Ages. The first documented mention of the uniqueness of this place comes from 1719, in which a man named Basil, after washing his face, regained his eyesight, which he had lost two years earlier. As a gratitude, the nobleman donated a wooden chapel, which stood over the spring.

After many historical turmoil (the later brick chapel was destroyed by the Red Army during World War II), the reconstruction of this place was undertaken by Rev. Wacław Rabczyński in the 1950s. The chapel was completely restored, a Grotto was built by the spring (similar to the one in Lourdes in France), and seven Passion altars were placed on the adjacent hills. After the visit to this place in 1996 by the Statue of Our Lady of Fatima, the Hill of Crosses and the Monument of the Third Millennium were created. In the same year, the parish under the invocation of Our Lady of Sorrows.

Nowadays, the area around the Sanctuary is constantly modernized. There is a Pilgrimage and Tourist Center in the immediate vicinity.

=== Podlaskie Museum of Folk Culture ===
An open-air museum, the purpose of which is to protect monuments of wooden architecture in Podlaskie, as well as to recreate the traditional rural landscape of the region, is located on the vast area within the administrative boundaries of Wasilków, by the national road No. 8.

The collections of museum pieces collected in the open-air museum document the material culture of the Białystok region from the end of the 19th century to the 1970s. Visitors to the museum can see the historic wooden architecture of the Podlaskie village. At the entrance gate there is a magnificent windmill - Koźlak from 1836, and next to it there is a forge brought from Gródek. In total, about 30 buildings have been moved to the open-air museum since the beginning of the 1990s.

== Demography ==
According to the 1921 Census, the city had a population of 3,903, of whom: 2,469 were Roman Catholic, 950 Jewish, 481 Orthodox, and 3 Protestant. 3,348 residents declared Polish nationality, 514 Jewish, 23 Belarusian, 17 Russian, and one Czech. There were 713 residential buildings.

According to data from the Central Statistical Office (GUS) from January 1, 2024, the city had a population of 12,831.

Historical population

Year	Pop.	±%
1772	1,500	—
1799 (est.)	1,500	+0.0%
1846	1,916	+27.7%
1860	1,381	−27.9%
1877	1,500	+8.6%
1880	3,880	+158.7%
1890	3,335	−14.0%

Year	Pop.	±%
1897	3,880	+16.3%
1910	5,314	+37.0%
1921	3,903	−26.6%
1931	4,801	+23.0%
1939	5,574	+16.1%
1950	3,937	−29.4%
1960	4,162	+5.7%

Year	Pop.	±%
2004	8,751	+110.3%
2010	9,753	+11.5%
2012	10,306	+5.7%
2014	11,106	+7.8%
2022	12,559	+13.1%
2024	12,831	+2.2%

== Education ==
Primary schools

- King Sigismund Augustus Primary School in Wasilków is the largest educational institution in the commune. In 2019, a mural was painted on the school walls, the theme of which refers to the history of Wasilków and the activities of its students. In 2022, was completed the construction of a modern athletics track – the winning project of the participatory budget.
- Priest Wacław Rabczyński Primary School No. 1 in Wasilków is located in the town center. In 2019 was built a multi-purpose sports field at the school, for which external funding was secured. In 2020 was built a new playground on the school grounds. Since 2021 at the school is active a children's folk ensemble.
- Antoni Bućko Private Bilingual Primary School was built in 2020 at Antoni Bućko street in Wasilków.

Preschools

- "Słoneczne" Preschool in Wasilków is located in two locations: at 1/4c Polna Street and 24 Sienkiewicza Street in Wasilków. In 2022, the modernization of the preschool building at 1/4c Polna Street was completed, including the creation of an auditorium that hosts numerous cultural events.
- The "Tekakwita" Public Preschool with Integration Departments in Wasilków has three preschools: at 55 Kościelna Street, 19 Rynek Kilińskiego Street, and 1A Białostocka Street.
- The "Happy" Private Preschool with its integration departments has two locations in Wasilków: at 1 Nadawki Street and 106A Białostocka Street.

Nurseries

In 2025 the construction of the first public municipal nursery in the Wasilków commune is underway. Until 2025 Wasilkow commune is operated by private nurseries, they are subsidized by the Wasilków commune.

- The MiniMontessori Private Nursery has two nurseries in Wasilków: at 106 Białostocka Street and 1A Nadawki Street.
- The "Happy" Private Nursery has two nurseries in Wasilków: at 106 Nadawki Street and 106A Białostocka Street.
- The "Wesołe Robaczki" Private Nursery in Wasilków is located at 98 Białostocka Street, 16-010 Wasilków.

== Activities for society ==
- Social assistance: Municipal Social Welfare Center in Wasilków, Supraślska Street 21, Wasilków (Social Services Center in Wasilków, Dworna Street 19, Wasilków)
- Wasilków Senior Center, Białostocka Street 32, Wasilków

== Culture and recreation ==
Culture

- The Wasilków Municipal Cultural Animation Center at 13 Żurawia Street in Wasilków
- The Prof. Halina Krukowska Municipal Public Library at 19 Białostocka Street in Wasilków

Museums

- Podlasie Museum of Folk Culture
- Museum of the History of the Earth (Jurassic Dinosaur Park in Wasilków)
- Priest Wacław Rabczyński Memorial Room - Church of the Blessed Virgin Mary, Mother of Mercy in Wasilków

Activities

Since 2023, three stations of the BiKeR municipal bike rental system have been located in the town of Wasilków. The system covers the municipalities of Wasilków, Choroszcz, Juchnowiec Kościelny, Supraśl, and the city of Białystok[41].

Festivals

- The Days of Wasilków (Dni Wasilkowa) - is an annual event that brings together the residents of the Wasilków commune during musical, artistic and other events organized in the summer. Organized annually at the end of May and beginning of June. The events are free and open to anyone interested.
- Riverside Ambient Salon Festival (Nadrzeczny Salon Ambientu) - Ambient is an integral part of the Up To Date Festival program. Organized annually in July. The events are free and open to anyone interested.
- Reggae Day Festival - Organized annually at the end of August. The event is free and open to anyone interested.
- International Festival of Organ and Chamber Music (Międzynarodowy Festiwal Muzyki Organowej i Kameralnej) - Inaugurated in 2005, the Rev. Wacław Rabczyński Organ and Chamber Music Festival in Wasilków is the only cultural event of its kind in the Podlaskie Voivodeship. The festival has become a permanent fixture in the cultural scene in Wasilków and the Podlaskie Voivodeship, earning its rightful place on the map of Polish artistic centers and attracting outstanding artists from Poland and Europe. Organized annually on every Sunday in September. The events are free and open to anyone interested.

River of Fire Festival

- "River of Fire" Festival (Rzeka Ognia w Wasilkowie) - The main event of the festival is the fire dance competition – fireshow. Organized annually at the end of September. The event is free and open to anyone interested.
- Nora Ney Film Festival in Wasilków (Festiwal filmowy im. Nory Ney w Wasilkowie) - The event commemorates Nora Ney (born Sonia Nejman), a star of Polish cinema in the 1920s and 1930s. The festival's events, however, are not limited to Nora Ney alone; rather, they constitute a historical, socio-cultural journey through the interwar period, set in the context of contemporary cinematography. Organized annually in October. The event is free and open to anyone interested.
- Senior Day in Wasilków (Wasilkowski Dzień Seniora) - is an annual event that aims to emphazise the value that seniors can provide in life and culture. The event is free and open to anyone interested.
- Birthday of the town of Wasilków (Urodziny Wasilkowa) - It is an annual event, consisting of a series of events bringing together the residents of Wasilków commune. Organized annually at the beginning of December. The events are free and open to anyone interested.

== Main roads ==
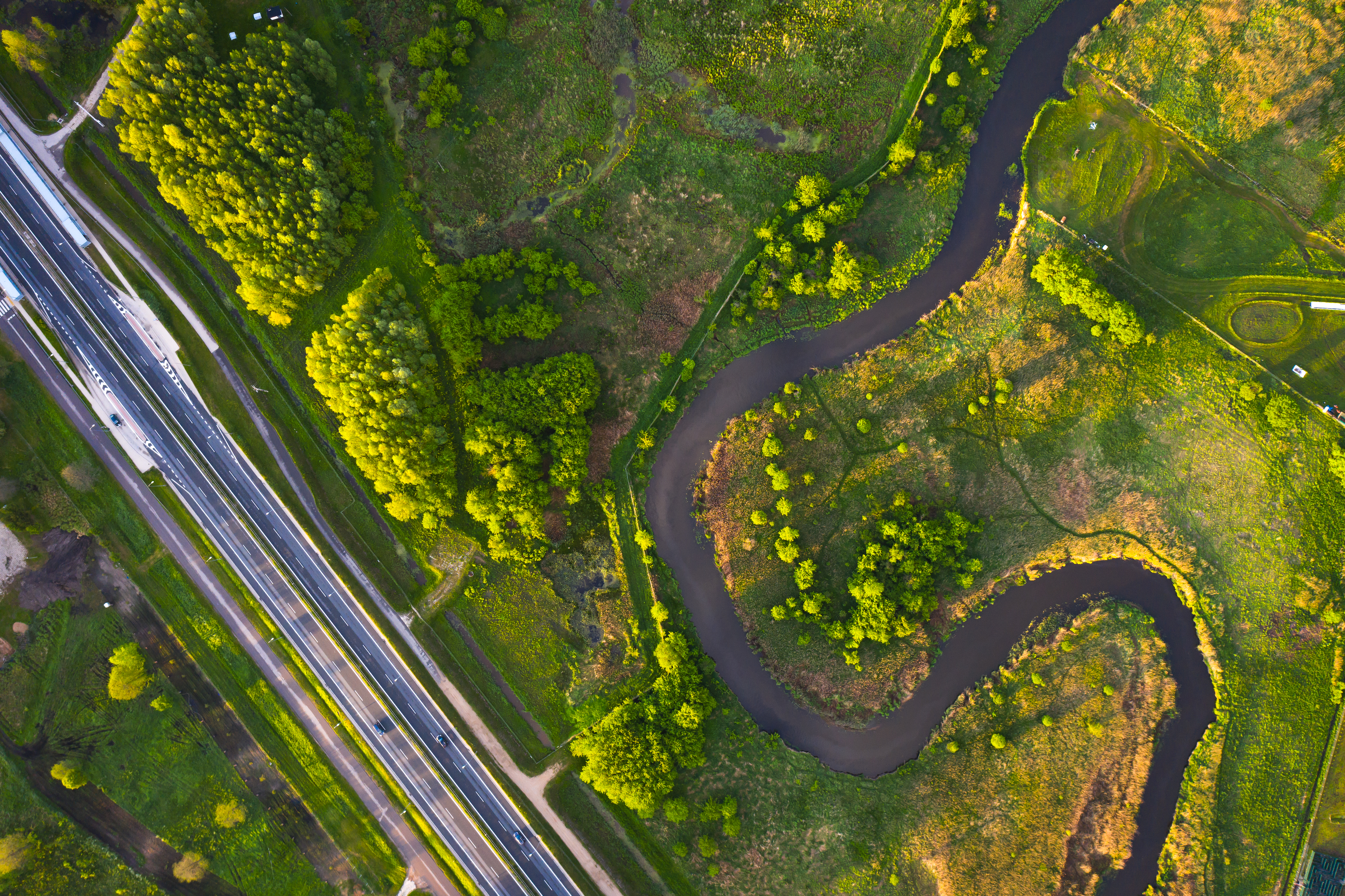
Road No. 19

National Road No. 19 runs through Białystok to Rzeszów, reaching the border crossing with Belarus in Kuźnica. It passes Wasilków on the bypass.

The Wasilków railway station is located in the town, on the No. 6 Zielonka–Kuźnica Białostocka railway line.

== Volunteer Fire Departments (VFDs) ==
There are five Volunteer Fire Departments (VFDs) operating in the Wasilków commune, including three incorporated into the National Rescue and Firefighting System. In Wasilków there is one of five Volunteer Fire Department, which is located at Dworna Street 19.
