= West Galicia =

Administrative subdivision of the Habsburg monarchy

New Galicia Neugalizien (German)
- Administrative region of the Kingdom of Galicia and Lodomeria (Habsburg Monarchy)
- 1795–1803
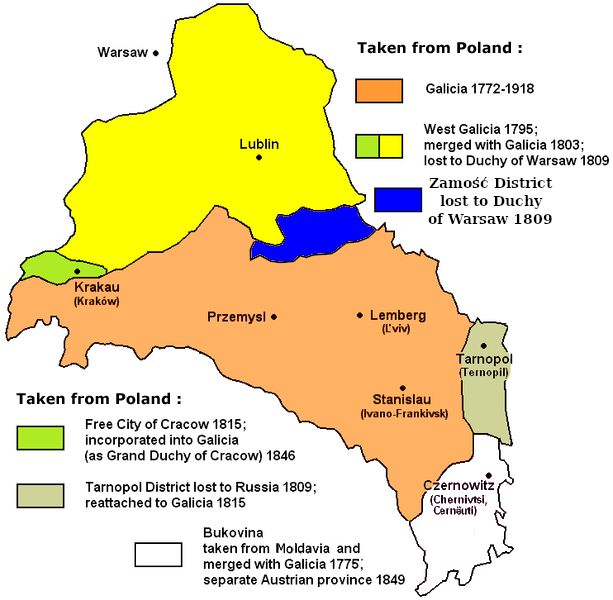
- New Galicia is shown in yellow and green
- Capital: Lublin; Kraków (from 1797)
- History
  - Third Partition of Poland: 24 October 1795
  - Joined Galicia: 1803
  - Treaty of Schönbrunn: 14 October 1809
Preceded by
Masovian Voivodeship (1526–1795)
Kraków Voivodeship (14th century – 1795)
Sandomierz Voivodeship
Lublin Voivodeship (1474–1795)
Succeeded by
Kingdom of Galicia and Lodomeria
Duchy of Warsaw
- Today part of: Poland

New Galicia or West Galicia (Polish: Nowa Galicja or Galicja Zachodnia; German: Neugalizien or Westgalizien) was an administrative region of the Habsburg monarchy, constituted from the territory annexed in the course of the Third Partition of Poland in 1795. In 1803, it was merged with another constituent possession of the Habsburg monarchy, the Kingdom of Galicia and Lodomeria.

The Austrian Empire lost West Galicia and the adjoining District of Zamosc to the Duchy of Warsaw in 1809 after its defeat by Napoleon.

== History ==
After the failed Kościuszko Uprising of 1794, Emperor Francis II of Habsburg agreed with Empress Catherine II of Russia to again divide and thereby completely abolish the remaining Polish–Lithuanian Commonwealth, a decision which Prussia joined on 24 October 1795. The Habsburg monarchy, which had not participated in the Second Partition, now received a share that comprised territory north of the Kingdom of Galicia and Lodomeria, whose territory was acquired in the First Partition of 1772. The Habsburg monarchy then occupied the whole of the region of Lesser Poland, which stretched along the upper Vistula River to the outskirts of Praga and Warsaw, with the tributaries of the Bug and the Pilica forming its northern border with New East Prussia.

In 1803, New Galicia was subsumed into the Kingdom of Galicia and Lodomeria, but retained some autonomy. It remained a territory of the Austrian Empire even when, in 1807, Napoleon I of France instituted the Duchy of Warsaw from territories in the region of Greater Poland that Prussia had annexed in the Second and Third Partitions and then renounced pursuant to the Treaty of Tilsit.

Austria lost New Galicia in 1809 as a result of the War of the Fifth Coalition, after a corps under Archduke Ferdinand Karl Joseph of Austria-Este on 15 April 1809 started the Polish–Austrian War by invading the Duchy of Warsaw. Despite the Archduke's plans to move in as a national liberator, he was challenged by the forces of Prince Józef Poniatowski at the Battle of Raszyn. Austria was finally defeated at the Battle of Wagram on 6 July, whereafter New Galicia was ceded to the Duchy of Warsaw pursuant to the Treaty of Schönbrunn.

With the Final Act of the Vienna Congress in 1815, the territory became part of Congress Poland, ruled in personal union by Emperor Alexander I of Russia, while Kraków nominally retained independence as the Free City of Kraków.

== Administration ==
From 1797, the seat of the local government (Gubernium) was Kraków. The province was divided into 12 districts:

- Biała Podlaska
- Chełm
- Józefów
- Kielce
- Końskie
- Kraków
- Lublin
- Łuków at Radzyń Podlaski
- Mińsk at Wiązowna
- Radom
- Sandomierz, from 1798 at Opatów
- Siedlce

Additionally, the districts of Myślenice, Bochnia, and Nowy Sącz were sometimes considered part of West Galicia, although they were acquired in the First Partition and were located south of the Vistula.

== Civil code ==
A civil code was introduced in West Galicia, prior to the introduction of the Austrian Civil Code in 1811. It contained little in the way of solving feudal-class problems and was based on the laws of nature.

== See also ==
- East Galicia
- Galicia (Eastern Europe)
- General Government
