= Siedlce Department =

19th century Polish local government area

Coordinates: 52°09′00″N 22°16′00″E

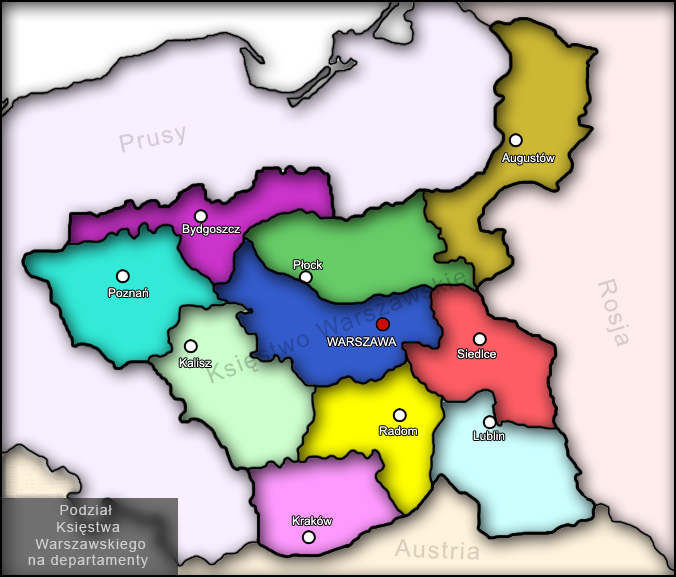
Administrative division of the Duchy of Warsaw, 1810–1815. Siedlce Department is red in the center-east.

Siedlce Department (Polish: Departament siedlecki) was a unit of administrative division and local government in Polish Duchy of Warsaw in years 1809–1815. Its capital city was Siedlce, and it was further divided onto 9 powiats. In 1815 it was transformed into Podlasie Voivodeship.

== General references ==
- Rogalski, Artur, ed. (2009). Siedlce w dobie napoleońskiej 1809-1815 [Siedlce in the Napoleonic Era, 1809–1815] (in Polish). Fundacja Rozwoju Badań Regionalnych "Sigillum". ISBN 978-83-919953-8-9.
