= Sapotskinsky Biological Reserve =

Sapotskinsky biological reserve is the reserve of national importance in Grodno Region, Belarus.

Established in 1978 in order to protect natural reserves of medicinal plants, landscape and floral complexes of rare and endangered species. Area - 12,600 hectares (2006).

The object of ecological tourism.

Located near Sapotskin, Grodno Region, Belarus.
