= Belostok Oblast =

1807–1842 unit of Russia

Belostok Oblast Russian: Беластокская область Polish: Obwód białostocki
- Oblast of Russian Empire
- 1807–1842
- Coat of arms

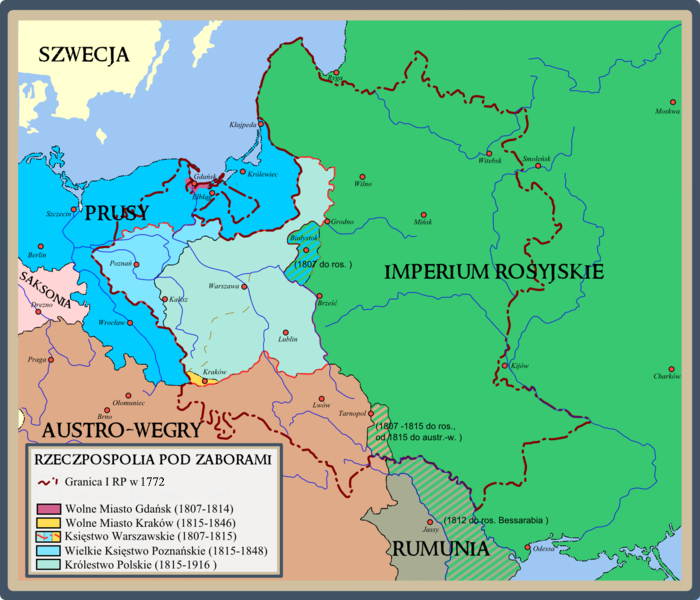
- Belostok Oblast in Eastern Europe
- Capital: Belostok
- Area
  - Coordinates: 53°08′N 23°09′E
- History
  - Established: 9 July 1807
  - Disestablished: 1842
Preceded by	Succeeded by
Białystok Department	Grodno Governorate

Belostok Oblast (Russian: Белостокская область; Polish: Obwód białostocki) was an administrative-territorial unit (oblast) of the Russian Empire with its capital in Belostok (Białystok). The region today is now mostly part of Poland.

== History ==
The oblast was created from former Prussian Białystok Department (until 1795 Białystok in Poland), gained in 1807 by Russia in the Treaties of Tilsit.

The oblast was abolished in 1842 when it was included into Grodno Governorate.

== Administrative divisions ==
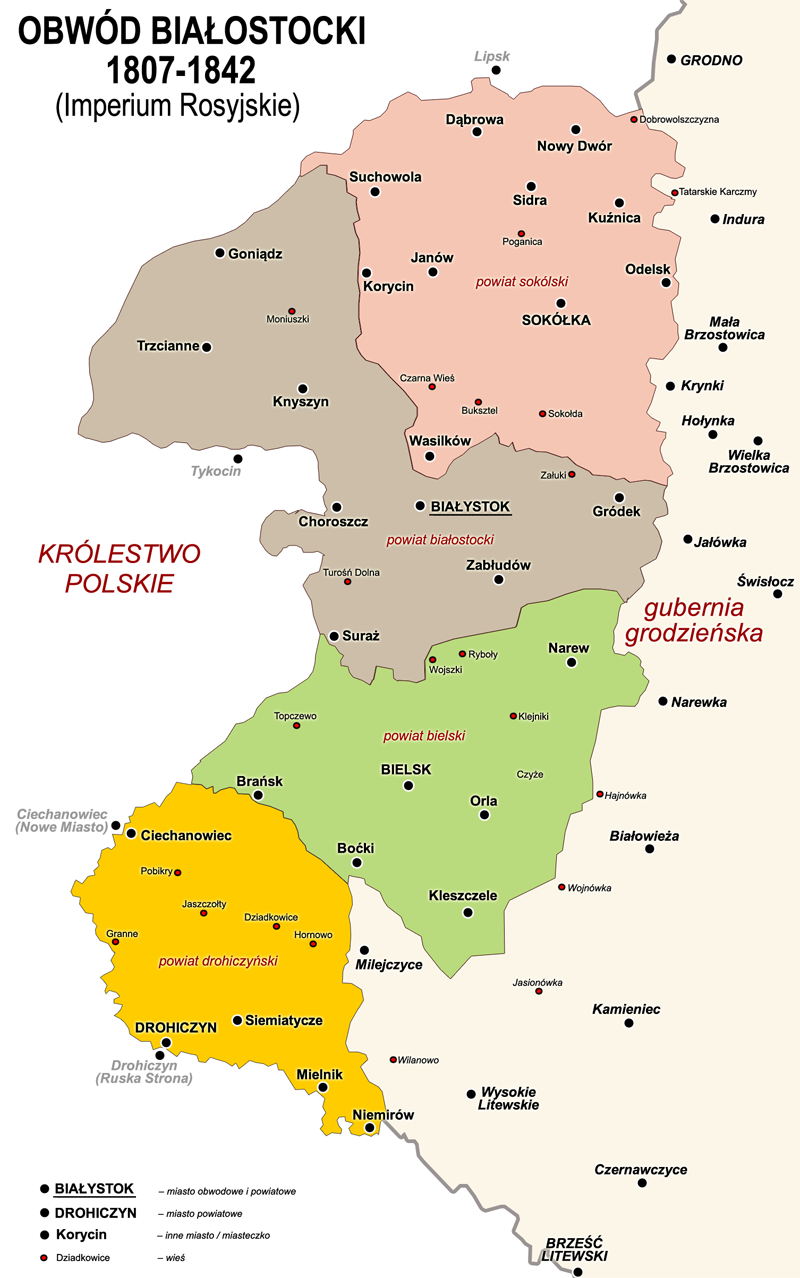
Belostok Oblast administrative divisions - 1807–42

In the 19th century, some of the oblasts were administrative divisions which had a status roughly equal to that of the guberniyas; i.e., they existed independently from the guberniyas, not as their parts as it used to be the case in the 18th century.

In 1808, the Oblast was divided into four uyezds (districts):

- Belostok including the cities of Białystok, Choroszcz, Goniądz, Gródek, Knyszyn, Suraż, Trzcianne and Zabłudów
- Bielsk including the cities of Bielsk Podlaski, Boćki, Brańsk, Kleszczele, Narew and Orla
- Sokółka including the cities of Dąbrowa Białostocka, Janów, Korycin, Kuźnica, Nowy Dwór, Odelsk, Sidra, Sokółka, Suchowola and Wasilków
- Drohiczyn including the cities of Ciechanowiec, Drohiczyn, Mielnik, Niemirów and Siemiatycze

In 1842 the number of districts was reduced to three when Drohiczyn District was merged into Bielsk District.
