= Białystok Department =

Prussian territory annexed from Poland

Białystok Department Kammerdepartement Bialysto (German)
- Department of Kingdom of Prussia
- 1795–1807
- Capital: Białystok
- Area
  - Coordinates: 53°08′N 23°09′E
- History
  - Established: 1795
  - Disestablished: 9 July 1807
Preceded by	Succeeded by
Podlaskie Voivodeship (1513–1795)	Belostok Oblast; Łomża Department
- Today part of: Poland; Lithuania; Belarus¹
- ¹ Sopoćkinie area

The Białystok Department (German: Kammerdepartement Bialystok, Polish: Departament białostocki) was part of the New East Prussia Province of the Kingdom of Prussia from 1795 to 1807. It was created out of territory annexed in the Third Partition of Poland and included parts of Podlaskie.

== Geography ==
The Białystok Department encompassed territory between East Prussia and the Bug River and Neman river.

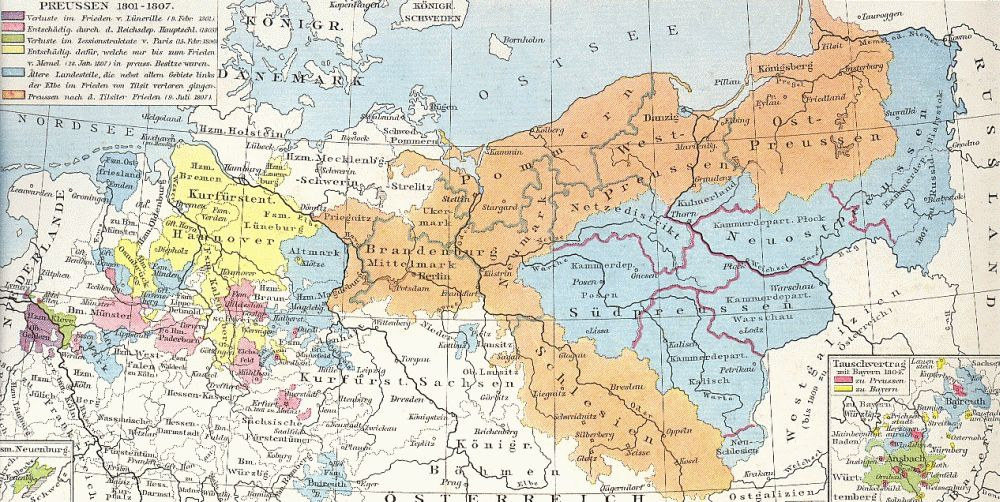
New East Prussia (Neuostpreussen) and the Departments of Plozk and Bialystok, 1801–1807.

== Administrative Subdivisions ==
The department consisted of the following counties

- Bialystok
- Bielsk
- Bobrz
- Dombrowa
- Drohiczyn
- Kalwary
- Lomza
- Mariampol
- Surasz
- Wygry
