= Augustów Voivodeship =

Congress Poland administrative unit (1816–1837)

Augustów Voivodeship Województwo augustowskie
- Voivodeship of the Kingdom of Poland (Congress Poland)
- 1816–1837
- Coat of arms
- Capital: Łomża (1816-1818), Suwałki (1818-1837)
- Area
  - Coordinates: 53°10′N 22°5′E
- History
  - Established: 1816
  - Disestablished: 1837
Preceded by	Succeeded by
Łomża Department	Augustów Governorate
- Today part of: Poland; Lithuania; Belarus¹
- ¹ Sopoćkinie area

Augustów Voivodeship was created in 1816 from the Łomża Department. Its capital was in Łomża until 1818, when it was transferred to Suwałki. In 1837 it was transformed into Augustów Governorate.

== Administrative divisions ==
It was divided into 7 counties:

- Biebrzańsk County (seat in Szczuczyn)
- Dąbrowski County (seat in Lipsk, later in Augustów)
- Kalvarija County
- Łomża County
- Marijampolė County
- Tykociń County
- Wigierski-Sejny County (seat in Sejny)

== Transportation ==
The Augustów Canal was built between 1823 and 1837 in the Augustów Voivodeship of the Kingdom of Poland. From the time it was first built, the canal was described by experts as a technological marvel, with 22 sluices and 18 locks contributing to its aesthetic appeal. It was the first summit level canal in Central Europe to provide a direct link between the two major rivers, Vistula River through the Biebrza River – a tributary of the Narew River, and the Neman River through its tributary – the Czarna Hancza River.
