= Płock Department =

Coordinates: 52°33′00″N 19°42′00″E

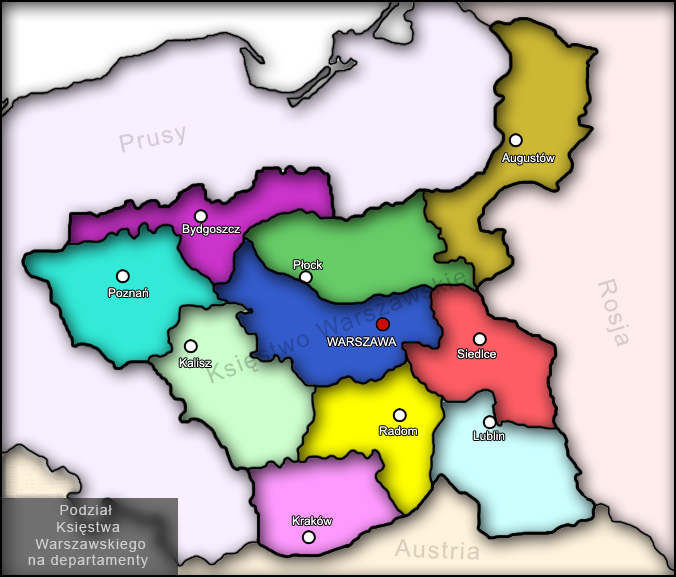
Administrative division of the Duchy of Warsaw, 1810–1815. Płock Department is green in the north.

Płock Department (Polish: Departament płocki) was a unit of administrative division and local government in the Polish Duchy of Warsaw from 1806 to 1815.

Its capital city was Płock, and it was further divided onto 10 powiats.

In 1815 it was transformed into Płock Voivodeship.
