= Sapotskin =

Sapotskin Сапоцкін (Belarusian) Сопоцкин (Russian) Sopoćkinie
- Urban-type settlement
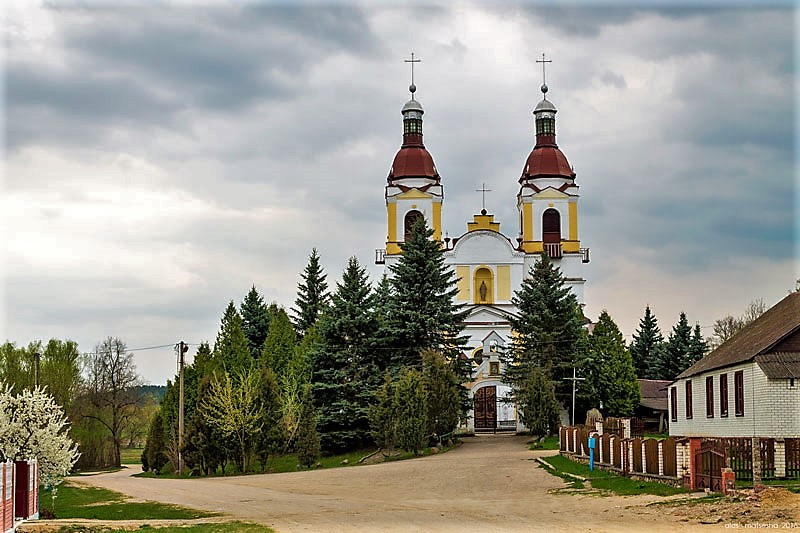
- Church of the Assumption of the Virgin Mary

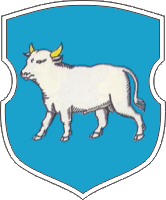
- Seal

- Location within Belarus
- Coordinates: 53°50′N 23°39′E
- Country: Belarus
- Region: Grodno Region
- District: Grodno District
- Established: 1560

Area
  - Total: 3.736 km^{2} (1.442 sq mi)
- Elevation: 203 m (666 ft)

Population (2025)
  - Total: 901
- Time zone: UTC+3 (MSK)
- Postal code: 231912
- Area code: +375 152

Sapotskin or Sopotskin (Note: Belarusian: Сапоцкін, romanized: Sapockin; Russian: Сопоцкин, romanized: Sopotskin; Polish: Sopoćkinie; Lithuanian: Sapackinė; Yiddish: סאַפּעטקין, romanized: Sapetkin.) is an urban-type settlement in Grodno District, Grodno Region, in western Belarus. It is located near the border with Poland and 27 km (16.8 mi) northwest from Grodno. As of 2025, it has a population of 901.

Sapotskin became one of the centers of the Polish minority in Belarus. It is the only town in Belarus where the Polish population, consisting of the majority, is allowed to use bilingual street signs.

== History ==
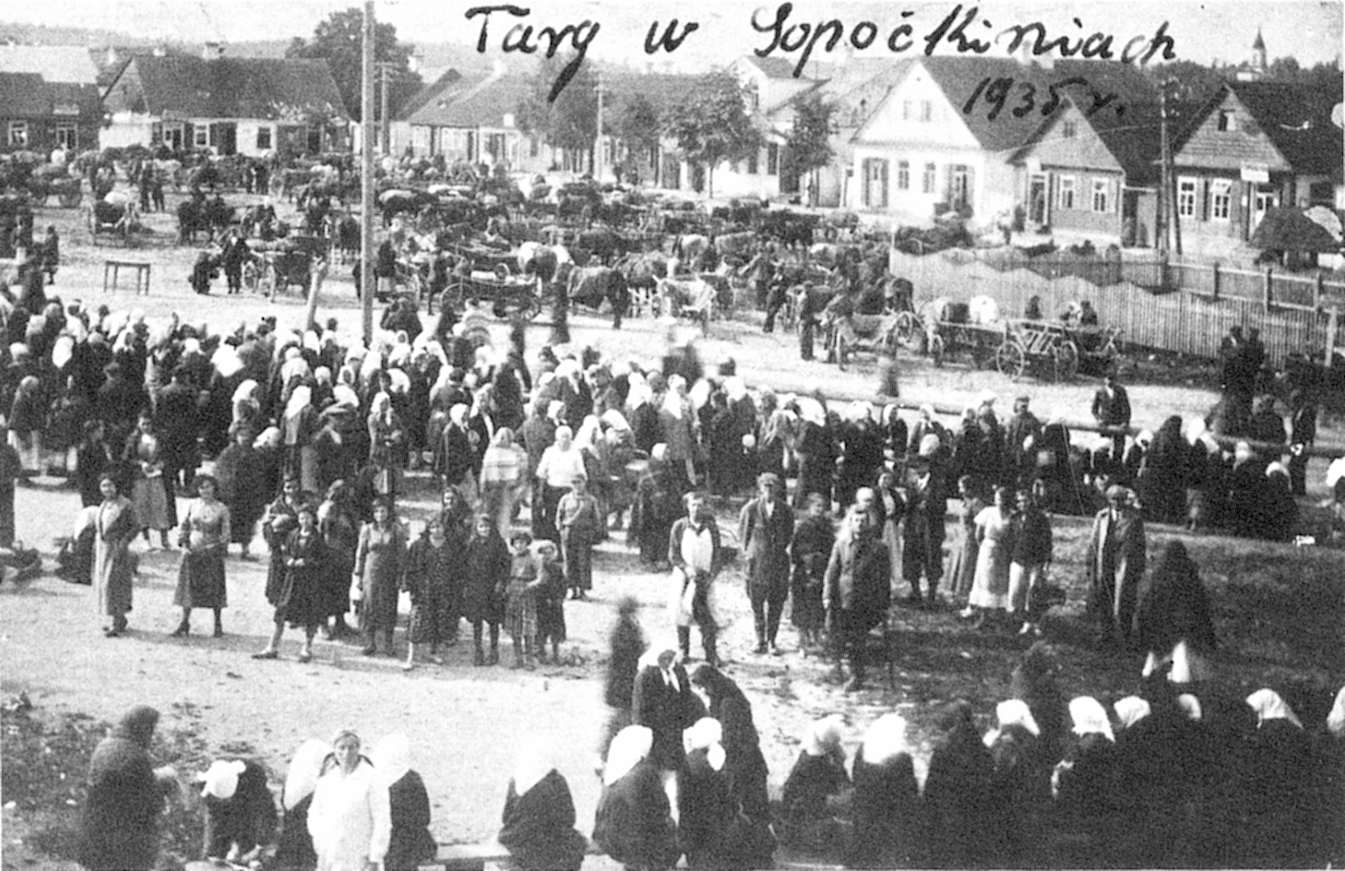
Market in 1935

Within the Grand Duchy of Lithuania and Polish–Lithuanian Commonwealth, Sapotskin was part of Trakai Voivodeship. In 1795, Sapotskin was annexed by the Kingdom of Prussia as a result of the Third Partition of Poland and incorporated into the New East Prussia Province. From 1807 until 1815, Sapotskin was part of Łomża Department of the Duchy of Warsaw.

In 1815, Sapotskin became part of Congress Poland, ruled by the Russian Empire. Within the Russian Empire, the town was successively part of Augustów Voivodeship (1815–1837), Augustów Governorate (1837–1867) and Suwałki Governorate (1867–1915) before German occupation between 1915 and 1918.

From 1921 until 1939, Sopoćkinie was part of the Second Polish Republic. It was a gmina centre in the Augustów County of Białystok Voivodeship. According to the 1921 Polish census, it had a population of 1,774, of which 86.4% declared Polish nationality and 13.6% declared Jewish nationality.

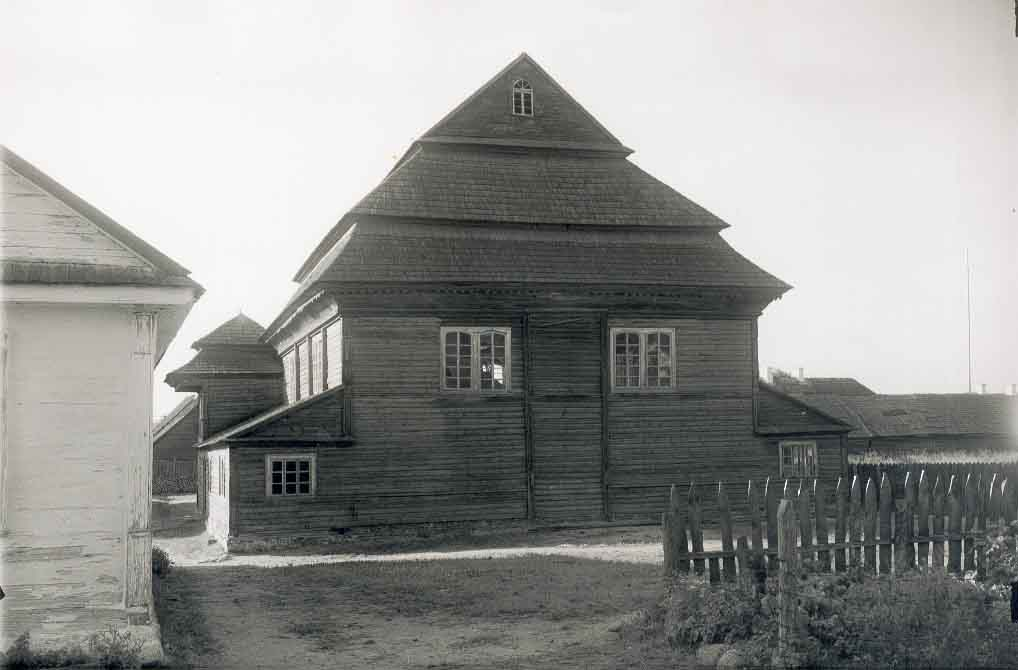
Synagogue in 1936

=== World War II ===
In September 1939, Sapotskin was occupied by the Red Army following the start of World War II, and, on 14 November 1939, incorporated into the Byelorussian SSR. The area became part of the Belastok Region of the Byelorussian SSR, with Sapotskin serving as a regional centre. Several local Poles were murdered by the Soviets in the 1940 Katyn massacre.

On 22 June 1941, the Germans invaded the Soviet Union and set fire to Sapotskin. The Jewish population at that time was around 1,300, and the Germans ordered them to dig mass graves and bury the hundreds of dead from the shelling and fire, both Jewish and non-Jewish. The Germans then asked local Poles to identify Jewish collaborators with the Soviet occupation. The Poles gave them a long list, some of whom had nothing to do with the Soviet regime, including the local rabbi and other community leaders, and those Jews were executed. After that, surviving Jews were confined to a seriously overcrowded and unsanitary ghetto. Those conditions, plus the lack of clean water, led to an outbreak of cholera. In 1942, many Jewish men were sent to forced labor camps, older and sick Jews were sent to an unknown place and executed, and in November, those remaining were taken to the Kielbasin transit camp. From there, about a month later, they were sent to the Grodno Ghetto and then, in January 1943, to Auschwitz, where almost all were murdered. Only a few local Jews survived the Holocaust, including those protected by the Falejczyk and Bykowski families who were later named by Yad Vashem as Righteous Among the Nations.

Polish partisans of the Home Army launched an attack on a German gendarmerie post in the town on 15 December 1943.

A memorial book about the town's Jewish shtetl was translated into English.

During the German occupation, Sapotskin was administered as a part of Bezirk Bialystok. Sapotskin was re-captured by the Red Army on 18 July 1944, and eventually annexed from Poland. The town became a regional centre of Grodno Region.

Old photographs of the town have been collected.

== Demographics ==
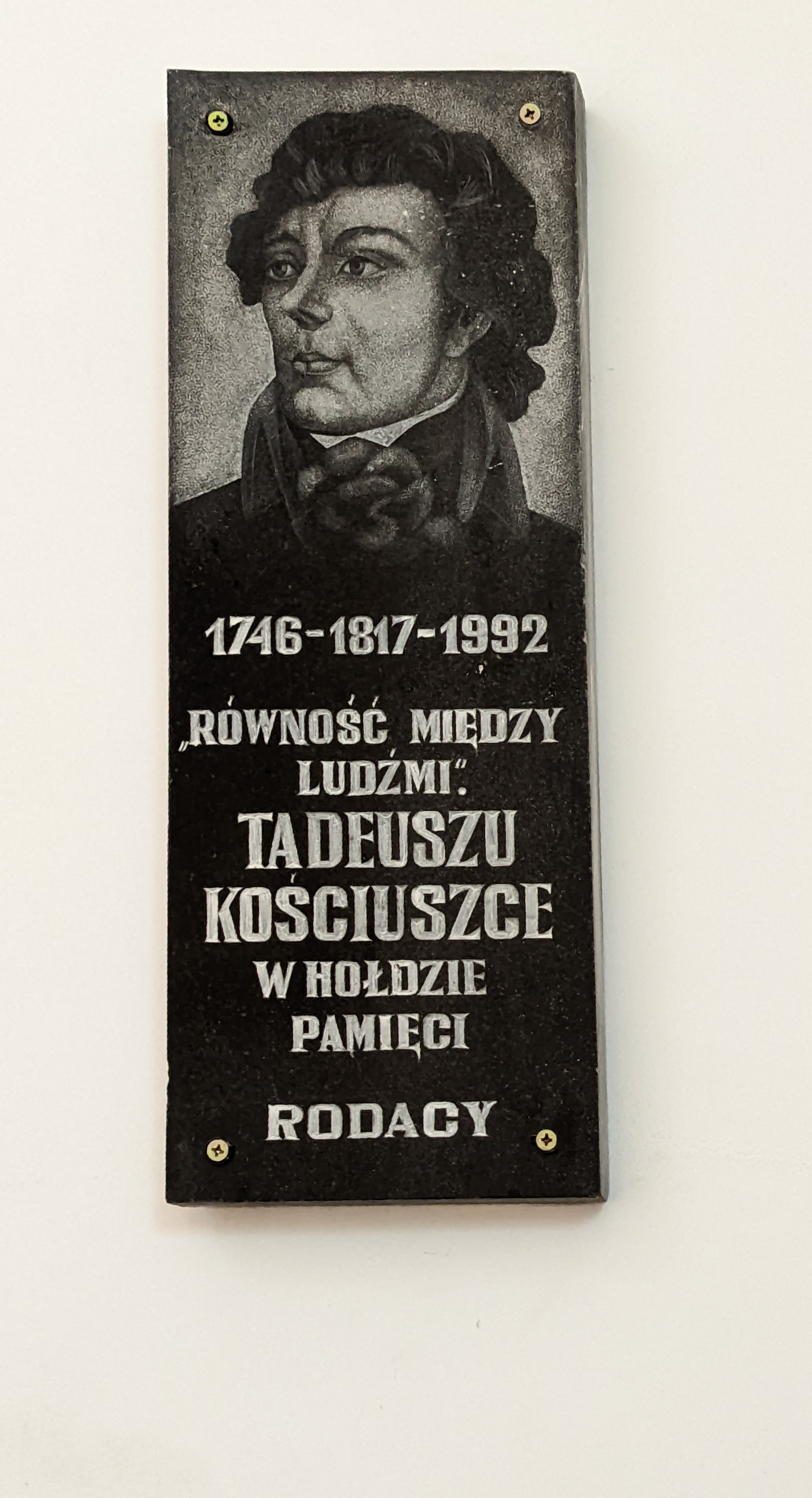
Modern Polish-language plaque to Tadeusz Kościuszko

Distribution of the population by ethnicity according to the 2009 census:

	percent
Poles	78.80%
Belarusians	14.30%
Russians	4.14%
Ukrainians	1.22%
Lithuanians	0.57%
Armenians	0.41%

== Attractions ==
- Burial mound (10th–11th centuries) – archaeological monument, on the western outskirts
- Church of the Assumption of the Blessed Virgin Mary (early 20th century)
- Sapotskinsky Biological Reserve (Augustów Canal)

== Notable people ==
- Józef Olszyna-Wilczyński (1890–1939), Polish general
- Jaroslav Romanchuk (born 1966), Belarusian economist
