= Łomża Department =

1807–15 Polish Duchy of Warsaw administrative division and local government

Coordinates: 53°11′00″N 22°05′00″E

Łomża Department Departament Łomzyński
- Department of the Duchy of Warsaw
- 1807–1813
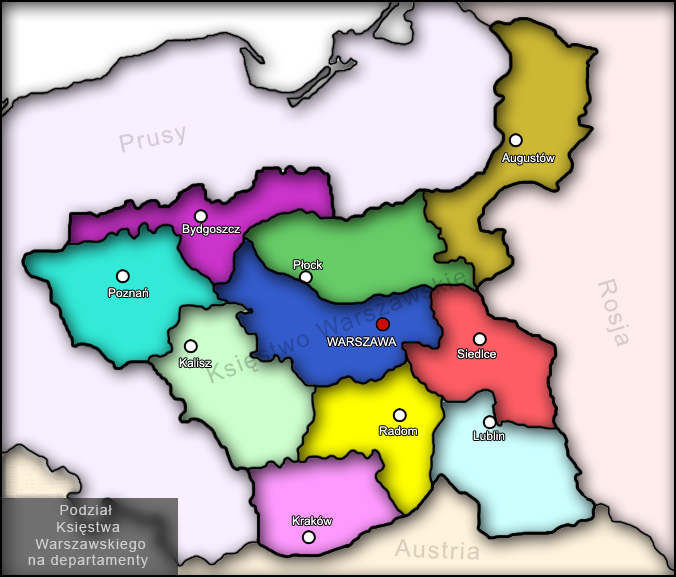
- Administrative division of the Duchy of Warsaw, 1810–1815. Łomża Department is brown in the north-east
- Capital: Łomża
- History
  - Established: 1807
  - Disestablished: 1813
Preceded by	Succeeded by
Białystok Department	Augustów Voivodeship
- Today part of: Poland; Lithuania; Belarus¹
- ¹ Sopoćkinie area

Łomża Department (Polish: Departament Łomzyński) was an administrative division and local government in the Polish Duchy of Warsaw in the years 1807–15. The department comprised 10 counties and had its capital at Łomża.

From January to July 1807 the department was known as the Białystok Department (Departament Białostocki), with its capital at Białystok. However, after the Treaties of Tilsit, the Russian Empire agreed to the creation of the Duchy of Warsaw; but in exchange the department ceded four counties: Białostocki, Bielski, Sokólski, and Drohicki. Thus the department's capital had to be moved, and its name was accordingly changed to that of the new capital, Łomża.

After 1815 most of the Łomża Department's territory became part of Augustów Province. In 1867 it was reconstituted as the Łomża Governorate.

== Administrative divisions ==
It was divided into 7 counties:

- Biebrza County (seat in Szczuczyn)
- Dąbrowa County (seat in Lipsk, later in Augustów)
- Kalvarija County
- Łomża County
- Marijampolė County
- Tykocin County
- Wigry-Sejny County (seat in Sejny)
