= Polish historical regions =

Regions that were related to a former Polish state

Polish historic regions are regions that were related to a former Polish state, or are within present-day Poland, with or without being identified in its administrative divisions.

There are several historic and cultural regions in Poland that are called ethnographic regions. Their exact borders cannot be drawn, as the regions are not official political or administrative units. They are delimited by culture, such as country traditions, traditional lifestyle, songs, tales, etc. To some extent, the regions correspond to the zones of Polish language dialects. The correspondence, however, is by no means strict.

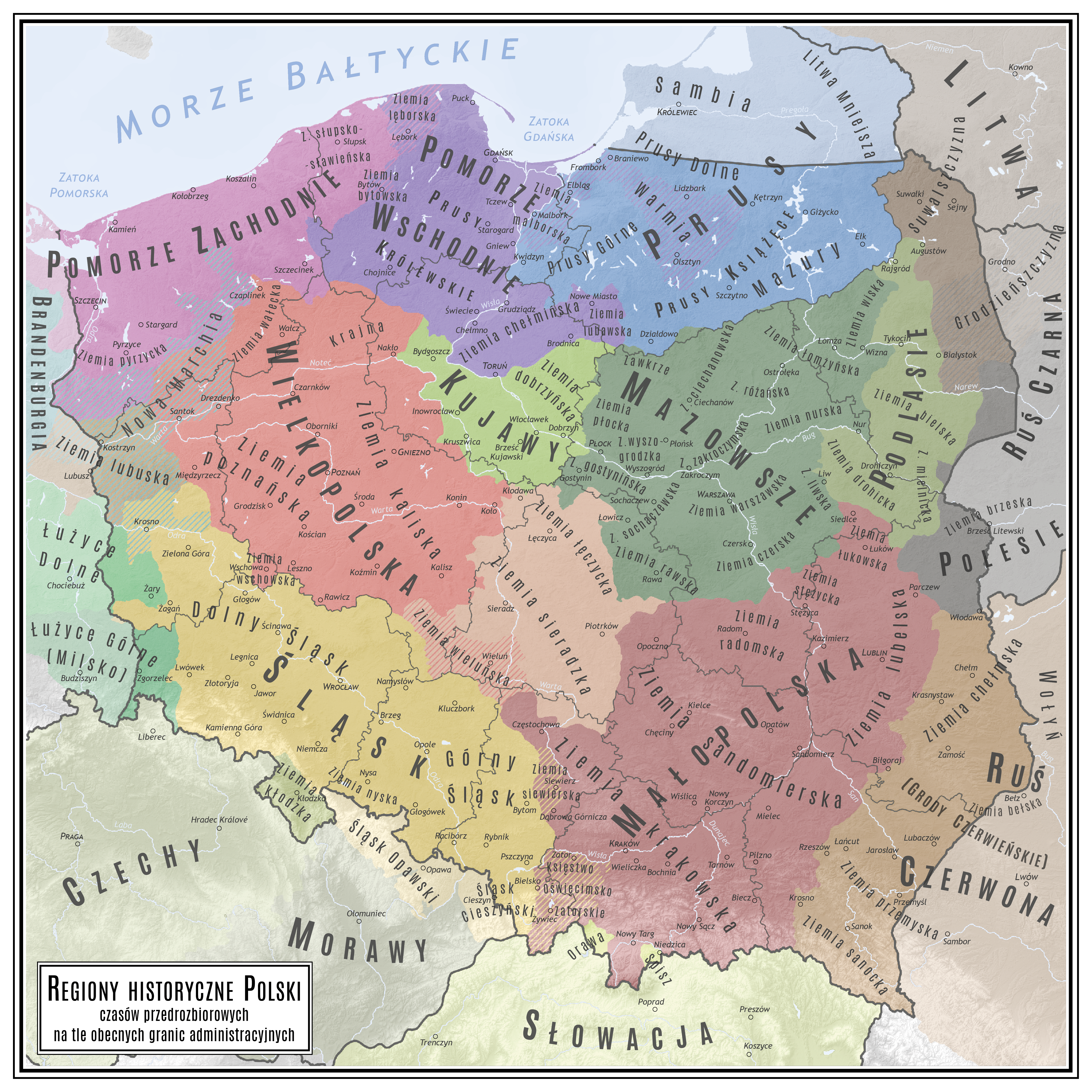
Historical lands of Poland against the background of modern administrative borders (names in Polish)

== Historical regions within the current Polish state ==
=== Historical regions with long existence within the Polish state ===
The following historic regions within Poland's modern borders belonged to the Polish state during most of its existence, inhabited by a majority or a sizeable Polish- or Cashubian-speaking population, thus forming the core Polish territory:

Coat of arms of Greater Poland and the Kalisz Land

- Greater Poland (Polish: Wielkopolska, Latin: Polonia Maior), in western and west-central Poland. Largest city: Poznań. The nucleus of Polish statehood with the earliest medieval Polish capitals of Gniezno and Poznań. One of the major historical regions of Poland since the Middle Ages. Periodically partially or entirely ruled by Germany and Russia during the Partitions of Poland.
  - Kalisz Land (Polish: Ziemia kaliska) in west-central Poland, named after the historical capital and largest city Kalisz. Periodically partially or entirely ruled by Germany and Russia during the Partitions of Poland.
    - Pałuki in central Poland. Largest town: Wągrowiec. Historical capital: Żnin. Periodically ruled by Germany during the Partitions of Poland.
    - Krajna in north-central Poland. Largest city: Piła. Historical capital: Nakło nad Notecią. Periodically ruled by Germany during the Partitions of Poland.
  - Poznań Land (Polish: Ziemia poznańska) in west Poland, named after the historical capital and largest city Poznań.
    - Wschowa Land (Polish: Ziemia wschowska) in west Poland, named after the historical capital Wschowa.
  - Santok Land (Polish: Ziemia santocka) in western Poland, named after the historical capital Santok. Largest city: Gorzów Wielkopolski. Also under German and Czech rule in the past.

Coat of arms of Kuyavia

- Kuyavia (Polish: Kujawy, Latin: Cuiavia) in north-central Poland. Largest city: Bydgoszcz. Historical capitals: Włocławek, Brześć Kujawski. Periodically partially or entirely ruled by Germany and Russia during the Partitions of Poland.
  - Dobrzyń Land (Polish: Ziemia dobrzyńska) in north-central Poland, named after the historical capital Dobrzyń nad Wisłą. Largest town: Rypin. Periodically ruled by Prussia and Russia during the Partitions of Poland.
Coats of arms of the Łęczyca, Sieradz and Wieluń lands, divisions of Łęczyca-Sieradz Land
- Łęczyca-Sieradz Land (Polish: Ziemia łęczycko-sieradzka) in central Poland, a region combined of three historic sub-regions. Largest city: Łódź. Periodically partially or entirely ruled by Germany and Russia during the Partitions of Poland.
  - Łęczyca Land (Polish: Ziemia łęczycka) in central Poland, named after the historical capital Łęczyca. Largest city: Łódź.
  - Sieradz Land (Polish: Ziemia sieradzka) in central Poland, named after the historical capital Sieradz. Largest city: Piotrków Trybunalski.
  - Wieluń Land (Polish: Ziemia wieluńska) in central Poland, named after the historical capital Wieluń.

Coat of arms of Mazovia

- Masovia (Polish: Mazowsze, Latin: Mazovia) in central and east-central Poland. Largest city: Warsaw. Historical capitals: Płock and Warsaw. The region contains one of the medieval capitals of Poland (Płock). One of the major historical regions of Poland since the Middle Ages. Periodically ruled by Prussia, Austria and Russia during the Partitions of Poland.
  - Lands of Płock Voivodeship (1495–1793)
    - Płock Land (Polish: Ziemia płocka)
    - Zawkrze (Polish: Ziemia zawkrzańska, Zawkrze) in north-central Poland. Largest town: Mława. Historical capital: Szreńsk.
  - Lands of Rawa Voivodeship (1462–1793)
    - Rawa Land (Polish: Ziemia rawska)
    - Sochaczew Land (Polish: Ziemia sochaczewska)
    - Gostynin Land (Polish: Ziemia gostynińska)
  - Lands of Masovian Voivodeship (1526–1795)
    - Czersk Land (Polish: Ziemia czerska)
      - Zapilicze in central Poland. Largest town and historical capital: Białobrzegi
    - Warsaw Land (Polish: Ziemia warszawska)
    - Zakroczym Land (Polish: Ziemia zakroczymska)
    - Ciechanów Land (Polish: Ziemia ciechanowska)
    - Łomża Land (Polish: Ziemia łomżyńska)
    - Wizna Land (Polish: Ziemia wiska)
    - Różan Land (Polish: Ziemia różańska)
    - Nur Land (Polish: Ziemia nurska)
    - Liw Land (Polish: Ziemia liwska)
    - Wyszogród Land (Polish: Ziemia wyszogrodzka)
    - Kurpie in north-central Poland, in northern Masovia. It is located in Łomża Land, Nur Land and Ciechanów Land.

Coat of arms of Podlachia

- Podlachia (Polish: Podlasie or archaic Podlasze) in north-eastern Poland; south-eastern outskirts in Belarus. Largest city: Białystok. Historical capital: Drohiczyn. Formerly entirely part of Poland. Periodically either entirely or partially ruled by Lithuania, Prussia, Austria and Russia.
  - Drohiczyn Land (Polish: Ziemia drohiczyńska)
  - Mielnik Land (Polish: Ziemia mielnicka)
  - Bielsk Land (Polish: Ziemia bielska)
  - Southern Podlasie (Polish: Podlasie Południowe) overlapping with the westernmost parts of Polesia (Polish: Polesie) in Poland. Polesia was formerly entirely part of Poland; now it is mostly divided between Belarus and Ukraine, with the largest city Homel located in Belarus.
- Suwałki Region (Polish: Suwalszczyzna, Latin: Sudovia - the latter term may, however, also refer to the earlier Yotvingia, only part in modern Poland, also a Lithuanian historical region (Lithuanian: Suvalkija) with largest city Marijampolė (Polish: Mariampol)) in north-eastern Poland, named after the largest city and historical capital Suwałki. A small part with Sapotskin (Polish: Sopoćkinie) was annexed from Poland in 1945 by the USSR and is now part of Belarus, though it is inhabited by a Polish majority.
- Grodno Region (Polish: Grodzieńszczyzna, German: Garten an der Memel), a small part of the region is in north-eastern Poland, while the remainder, including the historical capital and largest city Grodno (Garten), is in Belarus. Largest town in the Polish part is Sokółka. The Belarusian part retains a sizeable Polish minority. Formerly entirely part of Poland.
Coats of arms of the Kraków, Lublin and Sandomierz lands, divisions of Lesser Poland
- Lesser Poland (Polish: Małopolska, Latin: Polonia Minor) in south-central and south-eastern Poland. Largest city and historical capital: Kraków. One of the major historical regions of Poland since the Middle Ages. Centre of Polish statehood during late Middle Ages with the former national capital of Kraków. Periodically ruled by Prussia, Austria and Russia during the Partitions of Poland.
  - Kraków Land (Polish: Ziemia krakowska), named after the historic capital and largest city Kraków.
    - Siewierz Land
    - Oświęcim Land
    - Zator Land
    - Dąbrowa Basin (Polish: Zagłębie Dąbrowskie), named after the historical capital Dąbrowa Górnicza. Largest city: Sosnowiec.
    - Podhale
  - Sandomierz Land (Polish: Ziemia sandomierska), named after the historic capital Sandomierz. Largest city: Radom.
  - Lublin Land (Polish: Ziemia lubelska), named after the historic capital and largest city Lublin.
- Cherven Cities (Polish: Grody Czerwieńskie), over half of the territory is in Poland, remainder in Ukraine. Largest city: Rzeszów. The region overlaps with the western part of Red Ruthenia (Polish: Ruś Czerwona), the remainder of which with the largest city and capital Lwów (now Lviv) is now in Ukraine. Formerly entirely part of Poland. Periodically partially or entirely under Mongol, Hungarian, Austrian and Russian suzerainty in the past.
  - Chełm Land (Polish: Ziemia chełmska), including the Zamość Region (Polish: Zamojszczyzna), located mostly in eastern Poland, with northeastern part in Ukraine. During the Partitions of Poland divided between Austria and Russia.
  - Przemyśl Land (Polish: Ziemia przemyska), named after the historical capital and largest city Przemyśl
  - Bełz Land (Polish: Ziemia bełska), named after the historical capital Bełz, only partially in modern Poland, while the other part including its capital is in Ukraine. During the Partitions of Poland under Austrian rule.
  - notably without the Lwów Land and its capital city of Lwów, currently entirely in Ukraine, before World War II a city with absolute Polish-majority population, and one of the principal administrative, economic, educational, scientific, cultural and religious hubs of Poland; earlier, the nucleus and principal center of Polish national movement struggling to regain the independence of the country after the Partitions
- Spisz (Polish: Spisz, Slovak: Spiš), only partially in Poland, remainder in Slovakia, including the largest city Poprad. Formerly at various times either entirely or partially part of Poland.
Coats of arms of Kashubia, Kociewie and Chełmno Land
- Pomerelia, also known as Eastern Pomerania, Vistula Pomerania (Polish: Pomorze Wschodnie, Pomorze Nadwiślańskie; German: Pommerellen), mostly in northern Poland, with a small portion around the former village of Polski in the Kaliningrad Oblast of Russia; part of the larger Pomerania region. Largest city and historical capital: Gdańsk (Danzig). Formerly entirely part of Poland. One of the major historical regions of Poland since the Middle Ages, it was periodically ruled over by the Teutonic Order, which played an immense role in transforming the region and later by the Kingdom of Prussia during the Partitions of Poland. The region, despite being under the control of the Crown of Poland for long periods of time, held an incredibly significant and vast German population that heavily influenced the region’s civic administration, commerce, and development from the early 13th century until their ethnic erasure by the Soviets and communist Poles in 1945.
  - Gdańsk Pomerania (Polish: Pomorze Gdańskie; Kashubian: Gduńsczé Pòmòrzé; German: Danziger Pommern), is the main historical region within Pomerelia. Largest city and historical capital: Gdańsk (Danzig).
    - Kashubia (Polish: Kaszuby, Kashubian: Kaszëbë). Traditional capitals: Kartuzy and Kościerzyna.
      - Zabory, southern part of Kashubia with the towns of Brusy and Czersk.
    - Kociewie. Largest city: Tczew. Traditional capital: Starogard Gdański.
    - Tuchola Forest (Polish: Bory Tucholskie, part of it known also as Polish: Kosznajderia)
  - Chełmno Land (Polish: Ziemia Chełmińska) in north-central Poland, named after the historical capital Chełmno. Largest city: Toruń.

=== Historical regions being a part of Poland for varying amounts of time ===
Another group of territories constituted (either directly or as a fief) a part of the Polish state for varying amounts of time, ranging from episodes in the Middle Ages (e.g. Kłodzko Land, Lusatia) to several hundreds of years in the case of most, like Silesia, Warmia and Powiśle. Among them, only Warmia, Powiśle, southern Masuria, as well as Upper, Cieszyn and eastern and northern Lower Silesia retained sizeable Polish-speaking populations into the beginning of 20th century. Regions forming part of Poland since first historic rulers Mieszko I and Bolesław I the Brave of the Piast dynasty:

Coat of arms of Silesia and Lower Silesia

- Silesia (Polish: Śląsk, Silesian: Ślōnsk, German: Schlesien), mostly in Poland, small parts in the Czech Republic and Germany. Largest city and historical capital: Wrocław (Breslau). One of the major historical regions that was periodically ruled over by Poland during the Middle Ages; however, rule over the region later belonged to the Bohemian, Austrian, Hungarian, and Prussian Crowns.
  - Lower Silesia (Polish: Dolny Śląsk, Silesian: Dolny Ślōnsk, German: Niederschlesien), mostly in Poland, small parts in the Czech Republic and Germany. Largest city and historical capital: Wrocław.
  - Upper Silesia (Polish: Górny Śląsk, Silesian: Gōrny Ślōnsk, German: Oberschlesien), mostly in Poland, southern outskirts in the Czech Republic. Largest city is Katowice, historical capital is Opole.
    - Cieszyn Silesia (Polish: Śląsk Cieszyński, Silesian: Cieszyński Ślōnsk), partially in Poland, the other part called Trans-Olza (Polish: Zaolzie) is in the Czech Republic. Largest city and historical capital: Cieszyn.
- Lubusz Land (Polish: Ziemia lubuska), over half of the region, located on the eastern bank of the Oder River (Polish: Odra) in Poland, with the largest towns on the Polish side being Kostrzyn nad Odrą and Słubice. Remainder is part of Germany, including the historical capital Lubusz, now Lebus. Also ruled as part of either Silesia or Greater Poland within medieval Poland. The region was wholly part of Poland in the Middle Ages, and was also under Czech and German rule in the later periods.
- Pomerania (Polish: Pomorze Zachodnie, German: Pommern) understood as excluding Pomerelia; mostly in Poland (central and eastern parts), remainder in Germany. Largest city and historical capital: Szczecin (Stettin). The region was either wholly or partially ruled by Polish states at various times in the past, and was also under Danish, Swedish (partially), and German suzerainty for a significant part of its history.
  - Farther Pomerania (Polish: Pomorze Tylne, German: Hinterpommern), in north-western Poland. Largest city: Koszalin.
  - Western Pomerania (Polish: Pomorze Przednie, German: Vorpommern), small part in north-western Poland with the historical capital and largest city of Szczecin, remainder in Germany.
- Orawa (Polish: Orawa, Slovak: Orava), small part in southern Poland, remainder in Slovakia, including the largest town Dolný Kubín. Formerly entirely part of Poland.

Coat of arms of Kłodzko Land

- Kłodzko Land (Polish: Ziemia kłodzka, German: Grafschaft Glatz), in south-western Poland, named after the historical capital and largest town Kłodzko (Glatz). Periodically under Polish rule in the past, but mostly was under Bohemian, Austrian and German rule in the past. Sometimes also considered part of Lower Silesia.

Coats of arms of Upper Lusatia and Lower Lusatia

- Lusatia (Polish: Łużyce, Lower Sorbian: Łužyca, Upper Sorbian: Łužica, German: Lausitz), eastern part is located in Poland, remainder in Germany. Largest town in the Polish part is Żary (Sorau), considered the capital of Polish Lusatia. Largest city of the entire region is Cottbus (Polish: Chociebuż, Lower Sorbian: Chóśebuz). The region was either wholly or partially ruled by Polish states at various times in the past, but was mostly under Bohemian, German and Hungarian rule throughout its history.
  - Lower Lusatia (Polish: Łużyce Dolne, Lower Sorbian: Dolna Łužyca, German: Niederlausitz), eastern part is located in Poland, remainder in Germany. Largest town in the Polish part is Żary (Sorau). Largest city of entire Lower Lusatia is Cottbus (Polish: Chociebuż, Lower Sorbian: Chóśebuz). The region was either wholly or partially ruled by Polish states in the past, but was mostly ruled over by Bohemia, Hungary and Germany.
  - Upper Lusatia (Polish: Łużyce Górne, historically: Milsko, Upper Sorbian: Hornja Łužica, German: Oberlausitz), eastern part is located in Poland, remainder in Germany. Largest town in the Polish part is Zgorzelec. Largest city of entire Upper Lusatia is Görlitz (Polish: Zgorzelec, Upper Sorbian: Zhorjelc). Historical capital is Bautzen (Polish: Budziszyn, Upper Sorbian: Budyšin). The region was either wholly or partially ruled by Polish states in the past, but was mostly ruled over by Germany, Bohemia and Hungary. The modern Polish part is sometimes also considered part of Lower Silesia.

=== Historical regions since the Jagiellonian dynasty ===
Regions forming part of Poland since the Late Middle Ages and the Jagiellonian dynasty:

- Masuria (Polish: Mazury), mostly in north-eastern Poland. Largest city and historical capital: Ełk.
  - Galindia (Polish: Galindia)
  - Sasna (Polish: Ziemia Sasinów)
  - Bartia (Polish: Barcja), partially overlapping Masuria. Small part of Bartia outside of Masuria is located in the Kaliningrad Oblast of Russia (historically East Prussia).
  - Lithuania Minor (Polish: Litwa Mniejsza) or Prussian Lithuania (Polish: Litwa Pruska, German: Kleinlitauen), the southern outskirts of Lithuania Minor overlap northern Masuria in an area now divided between Poland and the Kaliningrad Oblast of Russia. Remainder located in the Kaliningrad Oblast of Russia, including its historical capital Sovetsk (Polish: Tylża, German: Tilsit), and in Lithuania, including its largest city Klaipėda (Polish: Kłajpeda, German: Memelburg). It was never under Polish sovereignty at all in the past.
    - Nadruvia (Polish: Nadrowia, German: Nadrauen)

Coat of arms of Warmia

- Warmia in northern Poland. Largest city: Olsztyn. Historical capitals: Frombork and Lidzbark Warmiński.
- Powiśle (roughly English: Lower Vistula Plains) in northern Poland, with its northern part forming the Malbork Land (Polish: Ziemia malborska) otherwise known as the Vistula fens (Polish: Żuławy Wiślane); two whole region otherwise referred to as Upper Prussia (Polish: Prusy Górne). Largest city: Elbląg.
  - Pomesania (Polish: Pomezania)
  - Pogesania (Polish: Pogezania)
- Natangia, small part around the town of Górowo Iławeckie is part of Poland, with the remainder located in the Kaliningrad Oblast of Russia. Entirely under Polish sovereignty in the past.

== Historical regions of former Polish states, currently entirely outside current Polish borders ==
Outside Poland are several historic regions which were once part of medieval Poland, the Polish–Lithuanian Commonwealth or the Second Polish Republic. While these regions are important for Polish history, calling them Polish is in some cases controversial, as most of them, with the exceptions of Vilnius Region (Polish: Wileńszczyzna) in Dzūkija, or Black Ruthenia, were either never or centuries ago predominantly populated by ethnic Poles and now lie beyond the borders of Poland.

=== Historical regions included within Poland under the Piast dynasty ===
Regions either partially or entirely first included within Poland under the Piast dynasty (10th century–1370) are:

Coats of arms of Podolia and Volhynia during Polish rule
- Podolia (Polish: Podole, Ukrainian: Поділля, romanized: Podillia), now mostly in Ukraine with southern outskirts in Moldova. Largest city: Vinnytsia (Polish: Winnica). Historical capital: Kamianets-Podilskyi (Polish: Kamieniec Podolski). Formerly entirely part of Poland. In the past also partially or entirely under Mongol, Lithuanian, Hungarian, Turkish, Austrian and Russian rule.
  - Pobereże (Polish: Pobereże, Ukrainian: Побережжя, romanized: Poberezhzhia), southern part of Podolia, now mostly in Ukraine with southern outskirts in Moldova
- Volhynia (Polish: Wołyń, Ukrainian: Волинь, romanized: Volynʹ), now in Ukraine. Largest city: Rivne (Polish: Równe). Historical capital: Lutsk (Polish: Łuck). Formerly entirely part of Poland. In the past also partially or entirely under Mongol, Lithuanian, Austrian and Russian rule.
- Pokuttia (Polish: Pokucie, Ukrainian: Покуття, romanized: Pokuttia), now in Ukraine. Largest city: Kolomyia (Polish: Kołomyja). In the past also under Mongol, Hungarian, Moldavian and Austrian rule.
- Moravia (Polish: Morawy, Czech: Morava), currently in the Czech Republic, briefly part of Poland in the 11th century. In the past also under Czech, Hungarian and Austrian rule.
- Slovakia (Polish: Słowacja, Slovak: Slovensko) as a whole, temporarily part of Poland in the 11th century, including currently partially Slovak-held regions of Orawa and Spisz, which were part of Poland much longer. Afterwards under Hungarian, Austrian and Czechoslovak rule.

=== Historical regions during the times of the Jagiellonian dynasty and the Polish–Lithuanian union ===
Regions first included within Poland under the Jagiellonian dynasty (1386–1572), also by the Polish–Lithuanian union, are:

Coats of arms of Livonia and Samogitia during Polish rule
- Livonia (Polish: Inflanty, Latin: Livonia, Latvian: Livonija, Estonian: Liivimaa), in modern Latvia and Estonia. Most of Livonia was under Polish sovereignty, excluding the northernmost part, i.e. current northern Estonia, however, Poland claimed the entire region. The region was also under German, Swedish and Russian rule at various times in the past. Largest city: Riga (Polish: Ryga).
  - Courland (Polish: Kurlandia, Latvian: Kurzeme), now in Latvia. Largest city: Liepāja (Polish: Lipawa).
  - Latgalia (Polish: Łatgalia, Latvian: Latgale), now in Latvia. Largest city: Daugavpils (Polish: Dyneburg). The region retains a sizeable Polish minority.
  - Semigallia (Polish: Semigallia, Latvian: Zemgale), now in Latvia. Largest city: Jelgava (Polish: Jełgawa, historically Mitawa).
  - Selonia (Polish: Selonia, Latvian: Sēlija), now in Latvia. Largest city: Jēkabpils. (Polish: Jakubowo).
  - Vidzeme (Polish: Liwonia, Latvian: Vidzeme), now in Latvia. Largest city: Riga (Polish: Ryga). Historically named Livland in German and Terra Mariana in Latin.
  - South Estonia (Polish: Południowa Estonia, Estonian: Lõuna-Eesti), now in Estonia. Includes the counties of Viljandimaa, Jõgevamaa, Valgamaa, Tartumaa, Põlvamaa, and Võrumaa. Largest city: Tartu (Polish: Tartu, historically Dorpat).
  - Pärnu County (Polish: Parnawa, Estonian: Pärnumaa), now in Estonia. Largest city: Pärnu (Polish: Parnawa).
- Sambia (Polish: Sambia, Russian: Самбия, romanized: Sambiya), now in Kaliningrad Oblast in Russia. Largest city: Kaliningrad (Polish: Królewiec).
- Samogitia (Polish: Żmudź, Lithuanian: Žemaitija), now in Lithuania. Part of Lithuania in the Late Middle Ages and early modern period, and part of Russia following the Partitions of Poland. Largest city: Šiauliai (Polish: Szawle).
- Aukštaitija (Polish: Auksztota, Lithuanian: Aukštaitija), now in Lithuania. Part of Lithuania in the Late Middle Ages and early modern period, and part of Russia following the Partitions of Poland. Largest city: Kaunas (Polish: Kowno).
Coats of arms of Vilnius Region and Black Ruthenia during Polish rule
- Dzūkija (Polish: Dżukia, Lithuanian: Dainava), now in Lithuania and Belarus, partially overlapping with Black Ruthenia. Part of Lithuania in the Late Middle Ages and early modern period, and part of Russia following the Partitions of Poland. Largest city: Vilnius (Polish: Wilno). The region retains a sizeable Polish minority.
  - Vilnius Region (Polish: Wileńszczyzna, Lithuanian: Vilnija), named after the historical capital and largest city Vilnius (Polish: Wilno)
- Black Ruthenia (Polish: Ruś Czarna, Belarusian: Чорная Русь, romanized: Čornaja Ruś), now in Belarus. Part of Lithuania in the Late Middle Ages and early modern period, and part of Russia following the Partitions of Poland.
- White Ruthenia (Polish: Ruś Biała, Belarusian: Белая Русь, romanized: Biełaja Ruś), present-day central, northern and eastern Belarus, and western outskirts of modern Russia with Smolensk and Starodub. Largest city: Minsk (Polish: Mińsk). Part of Lithuania in the Late Middle Ages and early modern period, and part of Russia following the Partitions of Poland.
Coats of arms of Zaporizhzhia and Moldavia during Polish rule
- Ukraine (Polish: Ukraina, Ukrainian: Україна, romanized: Ukrayina), now known as Dnieper Ukraine (Polish: Ukraina Naddnieprzańska, Ukrainian: Наддніпрянщина, romanized: Naddniprianshchyna), now in Ukraine, country named after the region. Largest city and historical capital: Kyiv (Polish: Kijów).
  - Right-bank Ukraine (Polish: Ukraina Prawobrzeżna, Ukrainian: Правобережна Україна, romanized: Pravoberezhna Ukrayina)
  - Left-bank Ukraine (Polish: Ukraina Lewobrzeżna, Ukrainian: Лівобережна Україна, romanized: Livoberezhna Ukrayina)
  - Zaporizhzhia (Polish: Zaporoże, Ukrainian: Запорожжя, romanized: Zaporozhzhia)
- Moldavia (Polish: Mołdawia, Romanian: Moldova), currently in Romania, Moldova and Ukraine, a former vassal principality of Poland
- Wallachia (Polish: Wołoszczyzna, Romanian: Țara Românească), currently in Romania, a former vassal principality of Poland
- Novgorod Land (Polish: Ziemia Nowogrodzka, Russian: Новгородская земля, romanized: Novgorodskaya zemlya) and Pskov Land (Polish: Ziemia Pskowska, Russian: Псковская земля, romanized: Pskovskaya zemlya), now in Russia, former vassal principalities of Poland
- Upper Oka Principalities (Polish: Księstwa Wierchowskie, Russian: Верховские княжества, romanized: Verkhovskie knyazhestva), now in Russia. Includes the oblasts of Tula, Kaluga, Oryol, and Bryansk. Part of Lithuania in the Late Middle Ages and early modern period, and part of Russia following the Partitions of Poland.

=== Other regions ===
Regions first under Polish suzerainty under the Polish–Lithuanian Commonwealth:

- colonies of the Duchy of Courland and Semigallia, at the time a Polish-Lithuanian fief
  - Gambia, also a historical region of Portugal, France, the United Kingdom and Senegal
  - Tobago Island, Trinidad and Tobago, also a historical region of Spain, Malta (Sovereign Military Order of Malta), the Netherlands, France and the United Kingdom
  - a settlement near modern Toco on Trinidad, Trinidad and Tobago., also a historical region of Spain, Malta (Sovereign Military Order of Malta), the Netherlands, France, and the United Kingdom

== Bibliography ==
- Norman Davies, God's Playground: A History of Poland, vol. 1: The Origins to 1795; vol. 2: 1795 to the Present, Oxford, Oxford University Press, 1981, ISBN 0-19-925339-0, ISBN 0-19-925340-4. Chapter two: "The Polish Land", pp. 23–52.

== See also ==
- Administrative division of Poland
- Historical regions of Central Europe
- Prowincja
- Territorial changes of Poland
- Voivodeships of Poland
