= Lwów Land =

Former administrative unit of Poland

Coat of arms of the Lwów Land

Lwów Land (Polish: ziemia lwowska, Ukrainian: земля львівська, Latin: Terra Leopoliensis) was an administrative unit (ziemia) of the Kingdom of Poland and the Polish–Lithuanian Commonwealth between 1340 and 1772. Its capital was Lwów. Regional Sejmiks for Lwów Land, Sanok Land and Przemyśl Land took place in Sadowa Wisznia. The legal system of the Land was based on the Magdeburg Law.

Lwów Land, which was part of the Ruthenian Voivodeship, was divided into two counties - Lwów County and Żydaczów county. It sent six deputies to the Tribunal of the Crown of Poland and the land bordered Przemyśl Land and Sanok Land to the west, Belz Voivodeship to the north, and Halicz Land to the south. According to the 1676 royal report, in the Lwów Land there were 42 towns and 618 villages.

== Sources ==
- Lustracja województwa ruskiego, podolskiego i bełskiego, 1564-1565 Warszawa, (I) 2001, ss. 289. ISBN 83-7181-193-4
- Lustracje województw ruskiego, podolskiego i bełskiego 1564 - 1565, wyd. K. Chłapowski, H. Żytkowicz, cz. 1, Warszawa - Łódź 1992
