= Kalisz Region =

Kalisz Region Kaliskie
- Historical region
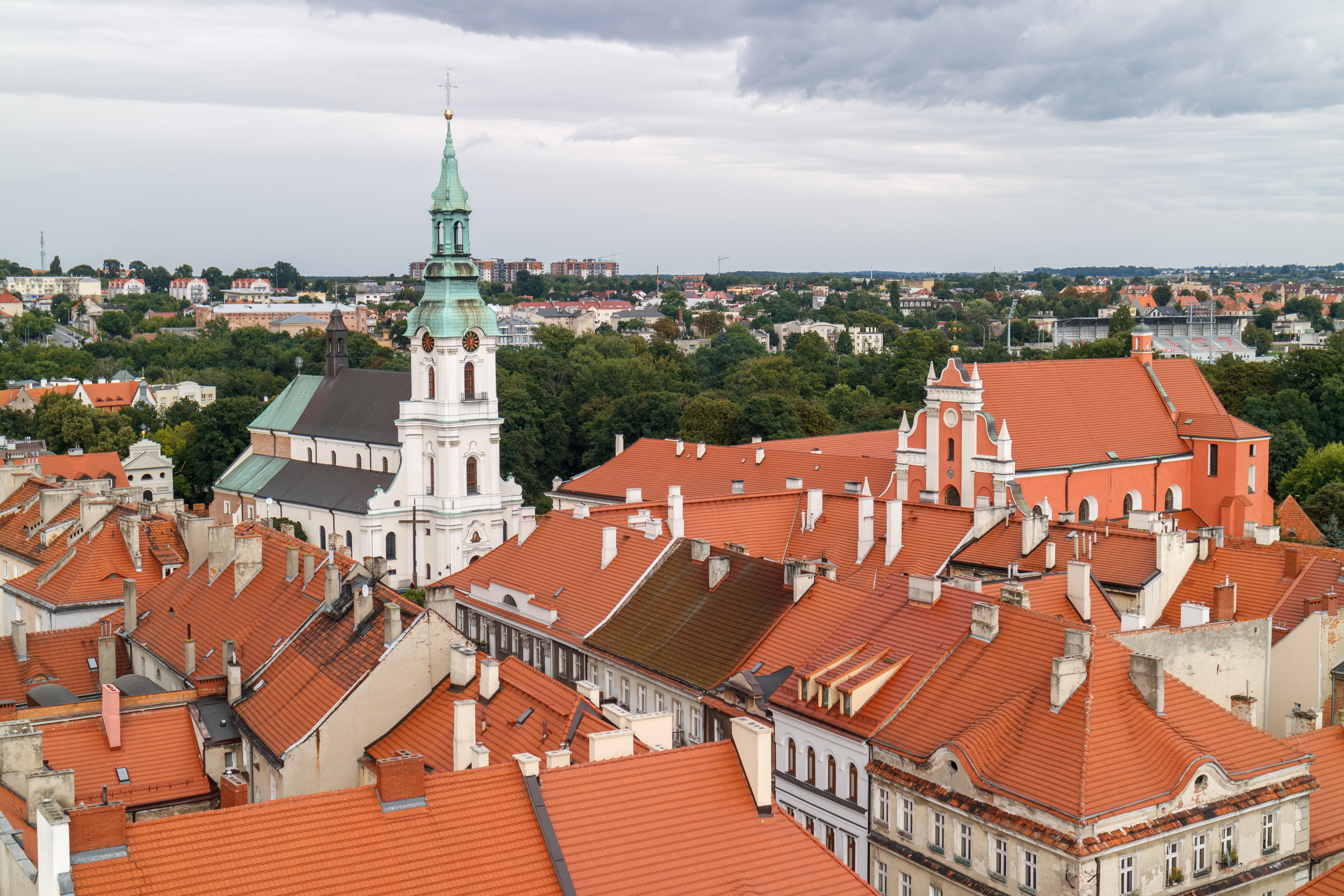
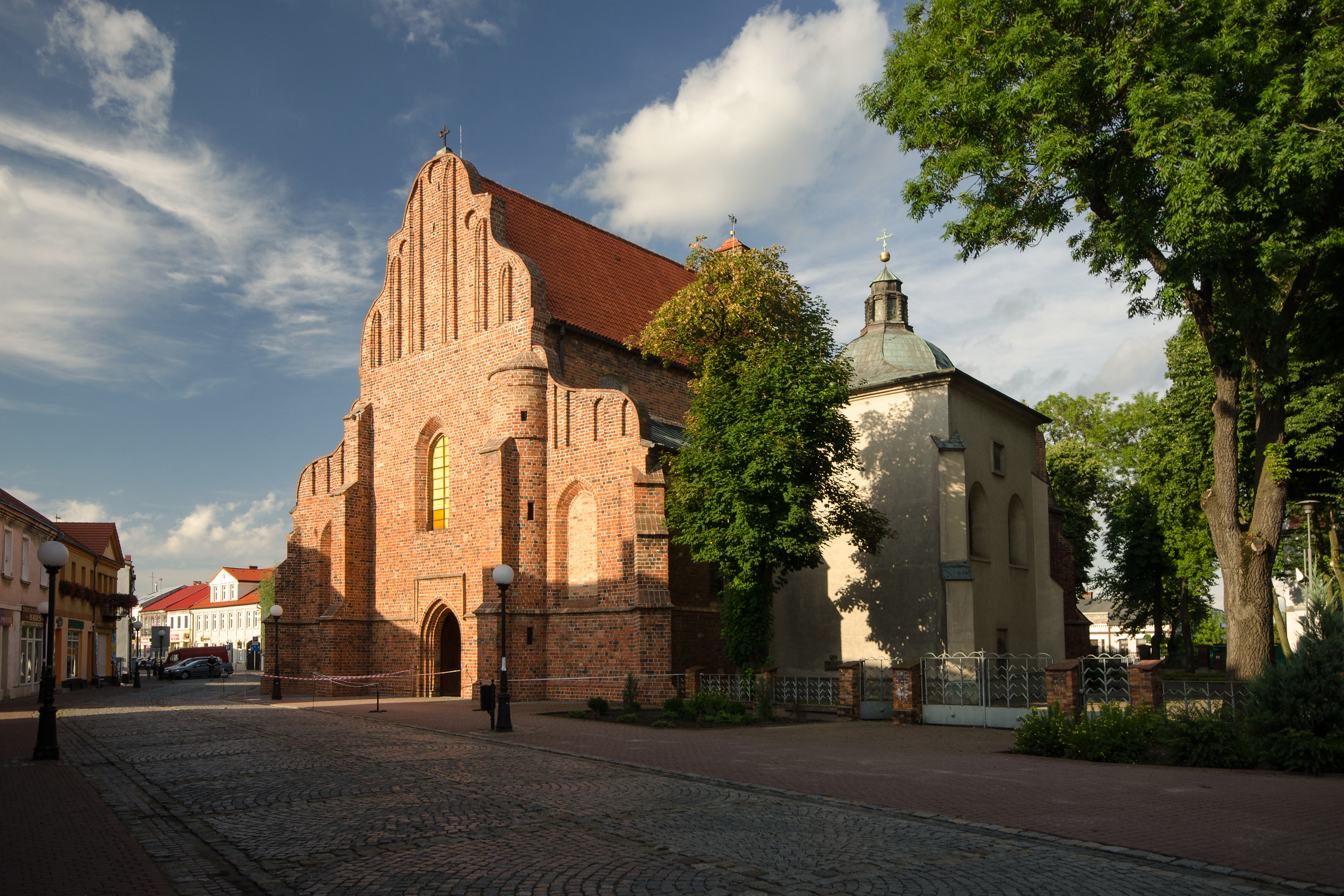
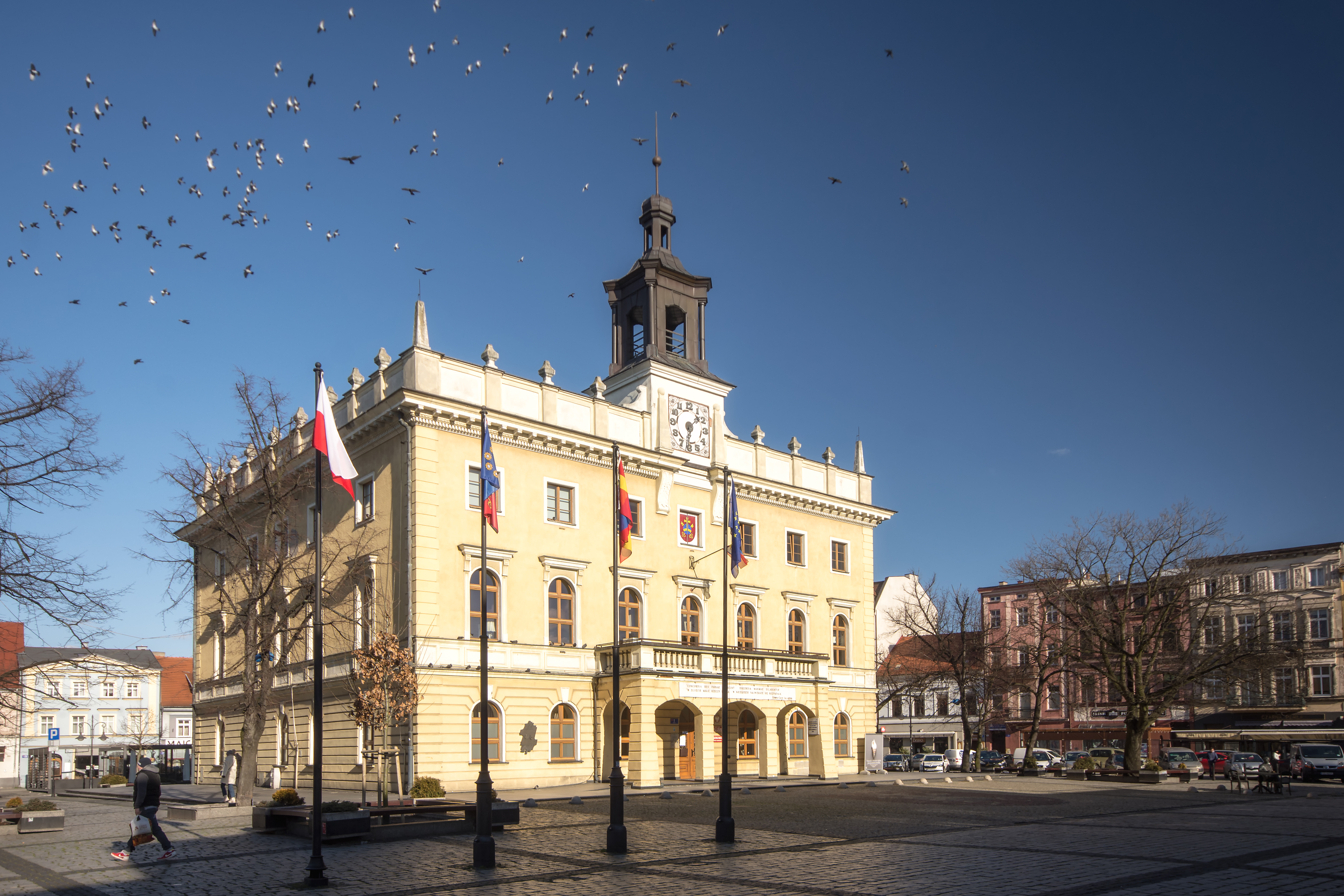
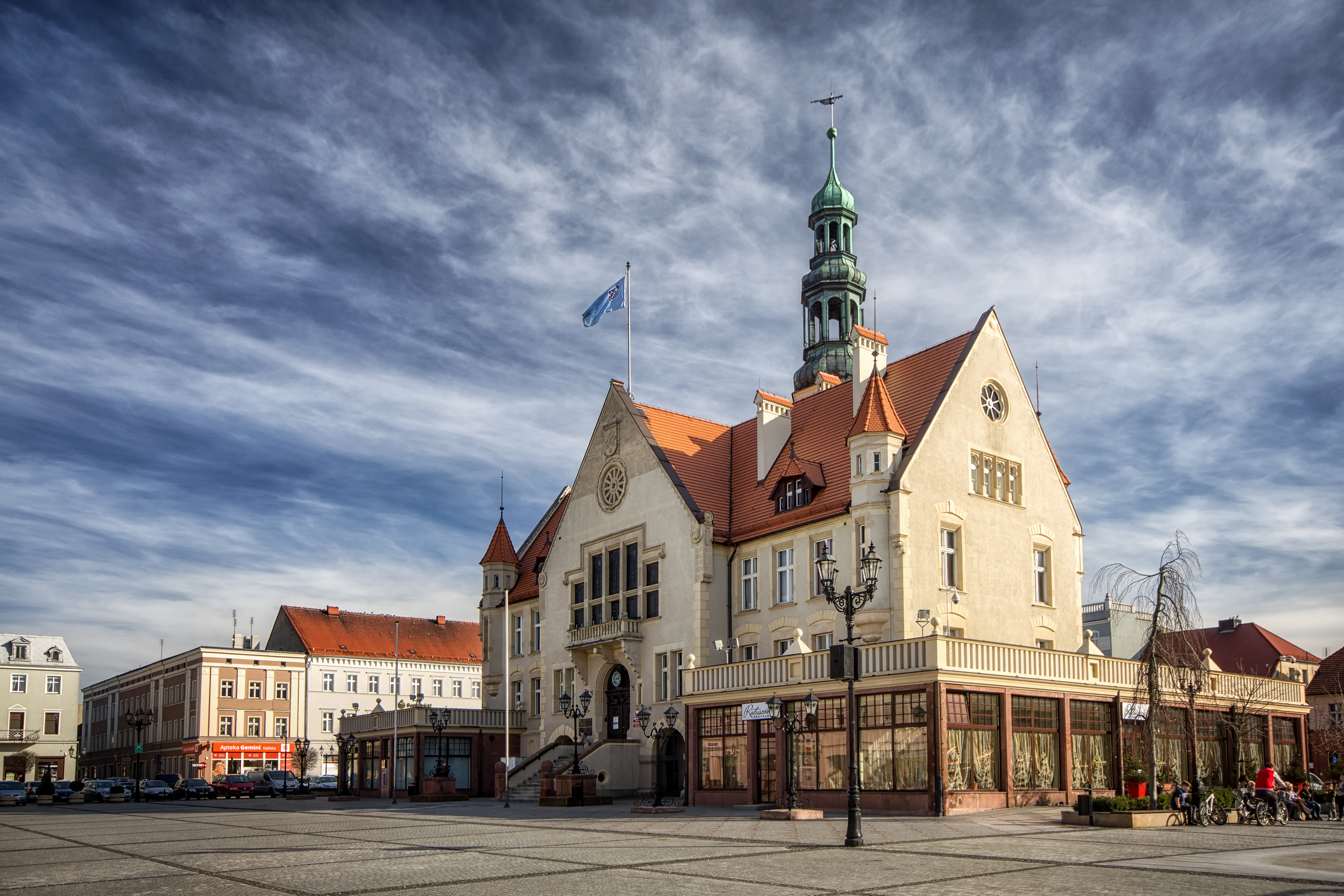
- Kalisz Old Town Saint Bartholomew church in Konin Market Square and Town Hall in Ostrów Wielkopolski Market Square and Town Hall in Krotoszyn

- Coat of arms
- Country: Poland
- Historical region: Greater Poland
- Capital: Kalisz
- Time zone: UTC+1 (CET)
  - Summer (DST): UTC+2 (CEST)

Kalisz Region (Polish: Kaliskie) is a historical and ethnographical region in central Poland, located mainly in the Greater Poland Lakes Area and South Greater Poland Plain. It forms the eastern part of the historic region of Greater Poland.

Kalisz Region encompasses the area of the former Kalisz Voivodeship, south of Lake Gopło as well as Wieluń Land. In the north it borders Kuyavia, in the south it borders Lower Silesia, in the west it borders Poznań Region and in the east it borders with Sieradz Land and Lęczyca Land.

The largest city of the region is Kalisz, other large towns include: Konin, Ostrów Wielkopolski, Jarocin, Koło, Krotoszyn, Września, Kępno, Środa Wielkopolska, Pleszew and Zagórów.

Kalisz Region is inhabited by an ethnographical group called Kaliszanie.
