= Land (administrative unit of Poland) =

Historical unit of administration

Land (Note: Polish: ziemia; Latin: terra) is a historical unit of administration in Poland and Ruthenia.

In the Polish language, the term is not capitalized (ziemia chełmińska, Chelmno Land; not Ziemia Chełmińska). All ziemias are named after main urban centers (or gords) of a given area: ziemia krakowska (after Kraków), or ziemia lubelska (after Lublin). In some cases, the suffix "-szczyzna" is added to the name of a ziemia: ziemia lubelska is also called Lubelszczyzna, while ziemia opolska (named after Opole) - Opolszczyzna.

The term ziemia appeared for the first time in medieval Poland (12th-13th centuries), after the fragmentation of Poland. It referred to a former princedom or duchy, which was unified with the Polish Kingdom, and lost its political sovereignty, but retained its hierarchy of officials and bureaucracy. From around the 14th century some of the former princedoms, now ziemias, were assigned to officials known as voivodes and became primary units of administration known as voivodeships (provinces). Therefore, the Duchy of Sandomierz was turned into the Land of Sandomierz, which in the early 14th century became Sandomierz Voivodeship.

However, in some cases ziemias were not transformed into voivodeships. They were subordinated to a voivodeship and a certain voivode, but nevertheless retained some distinct privileges and properties, such as often having their own sejmik (regional parliament), and were still referred to as a ziemia, not a voivodeship. Some voivodeships, such as Ruthenian Voivodeship or Masovian Voivodeship, consisted of several ziemias, each divided into counties (powiat). Over subsequent centuries, ziemias became increasingly integrated into their voivodeships and lost most of their autonomy.

In the Imperial Russia there was an institution of zemstvo or local council.

Today they are not units of administration, and in modern Poland are only generic geographical terms referring to certain parts of Poland. Currently, the term ziemia may apply to any area, historic or not, which is located around a main town or city. In Ukraine the term was intended to be introduced by Mykhailo Hrushevskyi in Ukraine as part of the administrative reform in 1918 which was interrupted by the Pavlo Skoropadskyi coup in April of that year. Currently oblasts of Ukraine are alternatively known through adding -shchyna to the administrative center's name such as Zhytomyrshchyna for Zhytomyr Oblast.

== List of ziemias in the Polish-Lithuanian Commonwealth ==
- Ziemia bielska (Bielsk Land, named after Bielsk Podlaski). It was part of Podlasie Voivodeship,
- Ziemia buska (Busk Land, named after Busk), which was part of Bełz Voivodeship,
- Ziemia chełmińska (Chełmno Land, named after Chełmno). Divided into five counties, it was part of Chełmno Voivodeship,
- Ziemia chełmska (Chełm Land, named after Chełm). Divided into three counties, it was an exclave of Ruthenian Voivodeship,
- Ziemia czerska (Czersk Land, named after Czersk). Divided into three counties, it belonged to Masovian Voivodeship,
- Ziemia ciechanowska (Ciechanów Land, named after Ciechanów). Divided into three counties, it belonged to Masovian Voivodeship,
- Ziemia dobrzyńska (Dobrzyń Land, named after Dobrzyń). Divided into three counties, it was part of Inowrocław Voivodeship,
- Ziemia drohiczyńska (Drohiczyn Land, named after Drohiczyn). It was part of Podlasie Voivodeship,
- Ziemia gostynińska (Gostynin Land, named after Gostynin). Divided into two counties, it was part of Rawa Voivodeship,
- Ziemia halicka (Halicz Land, named after Halicz). Divided into three counties, it was part of Ruthenian Voivodeship,
- Ziemia lęborsko-bytowska (Lębork-Bytów Land, named after Lębork and Bytów), which in the mid-1600s belonged to Pomeranian Voivodeship,
- Ziemia liwska (Liw Land, named after Liw). It belonged to Masovian Voivodeship,
- Ziemia łomżyńska (Łomża Land, named after Łomża). It belonged to Masovian Voivodeship,
- Ziemia łukowska (Łuków Land, named after Łuków), which was part of Lublin Voivodeship,
- Ziemia lwowska (Lwów Land, named after Lwów). Divided into two counties, it was part of Ruthenian Voivodeship
- Ziemia michałowska (Michałów Land, named after Michałów, now a district of Brodnica). Divided into two counties, it was part of Chełmno Voivodeship,
- Ziemia mielnicka (Mielnik Land, named after Mielnik). It was part of Podlasie Voivodeship,
- Ziemia nurska (Nur Land, named after Nur). It belonged to Masovian Voivodeship,
- Ziemia przemyska (Przemyśl Land, named after Przemyśl). Divided into four counties, it was part of Ruthenian Voivodeship,
- Ziemia rawska (Rawa Land, named after Rawa Mazowiecka). Divided into two counties, it was part of Rawa Voivodeship,
- Ziemia różańska (Różan Land, named after Różan). It belonged to Masovian Voivodeship,
- Ziemia sanocka (Sanok Land, named after Sanok). With one county, it belonged to Ruthenian Voivodeship,
- Ziemia sochaczewska (Sochaczew Land, named after Sochaczew). Divided into two counties, it was part of Rawa Voivodeship,
- Ziemia stężycka (Stężyca Land), named after Stężyca, with one county, part of Sandomierz Voivodeship,
- Ziemia warszawska (Warsaw Land, named after Warsaw). It belonged to Masovian Voivodeship,
- Ziemia wieluńska (Wieluń Land, named after Wieluń). Divided into two counties, it was part of Sieradz Voivodeship,
- Ziemia wiska (Wizna Land, named after Wizna). It belonged to Masovian Voivodeship,
- Ziemia wschowska (Wschowa Land, named after Wschowa), part of Poznań Voivodeship,
- Ziemia wyszogrodzka (Wyszogród Land, named after Wyszogród). It belonged to Masovian Voivodeship,
- Ziemia zakroczymska (Zakroczym Land, named after Zakroczym). It belonged to Masovian Voivodeship,
- Ziemia zawkrzeńska (Zawkrze Land, named after the Wkra river). Divided into three counties, it was part of Płock Voivodeship.
