= Nur Land =

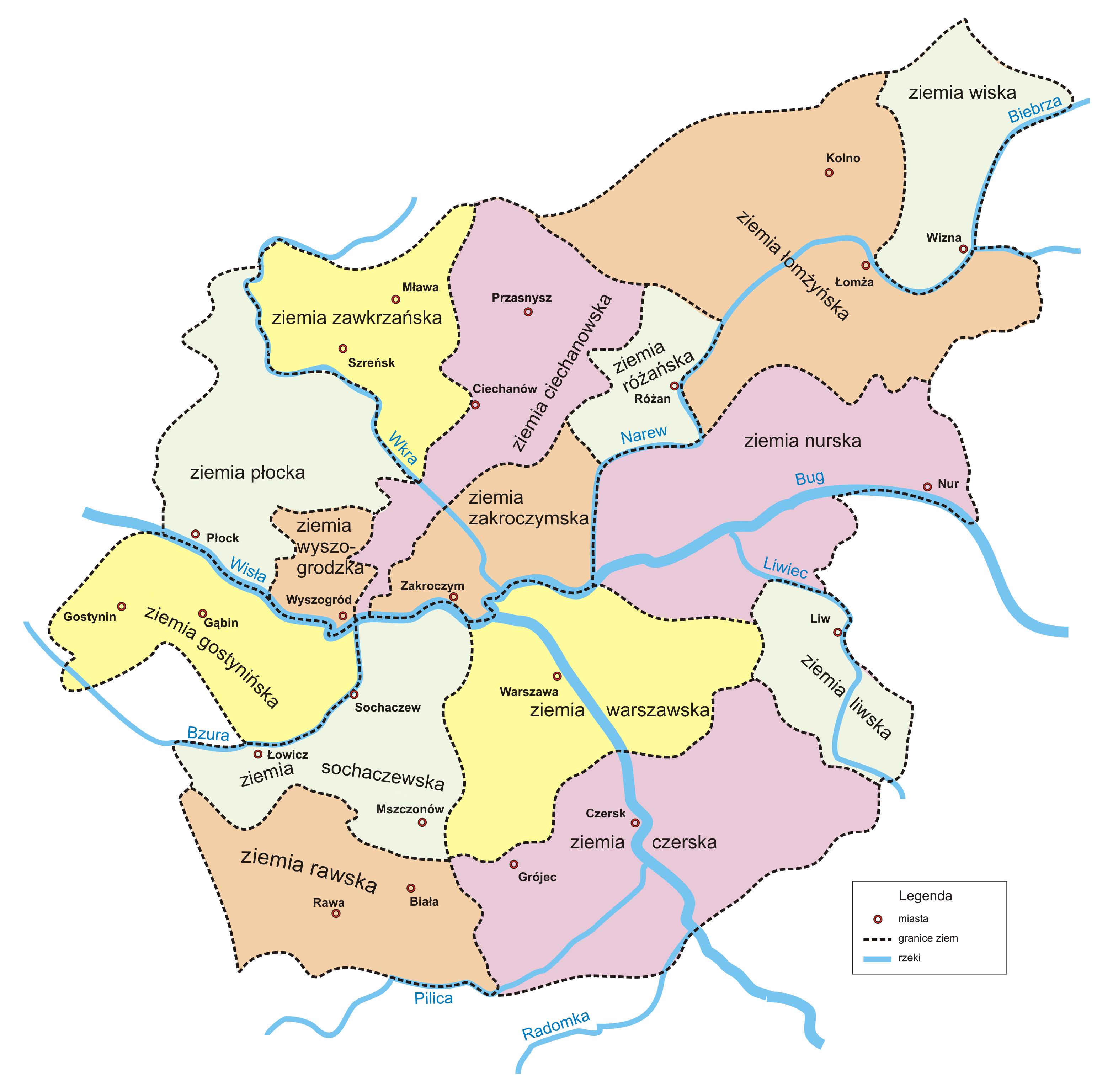
historical lands of Masovia

Nur Land (Polish: ziemia nurska), named after the town (now a village) of Nur, was an administrative unit (ziemia) of the Duchy of Mazovia, Kingdom of Poland and the Polish–Lithuanian Commonwealth. With its capital in Nur, it belonged to Masovian Voivodeship.

In the Middle Ages, Nur was one of the most important towns of Mazovia, and the seat of a starosta. In 1377, during a meeting of Mazovian dukes, which took place in Sochaczew, boundaries of the Land of Nur were established. It covered 3655 km^{2}, and was divided into three counties: Kamienczyk (area 2141 km^{2}), Nur (area 1001 km^{2}) and Ostrow Mazowiecka (area 512 km^{2}).

In 1526, Nur Land was annexed into the Kingdom of Poland, and until the Partitions of Poland, it belonged to Masovian Voivodeship. Local sejmiks took place at Nur.

== Sources ==
- History of Nur Land and County of Ostrow Mazowiecki
- Adolf Pawiński: Polska XVI wieku pod względem geograficzno-statystycznym. T. 5: Mazowsze. Warszawa: Księgarnia Gebethnera i Wolffa, 1895
