= Ciechanów Land =

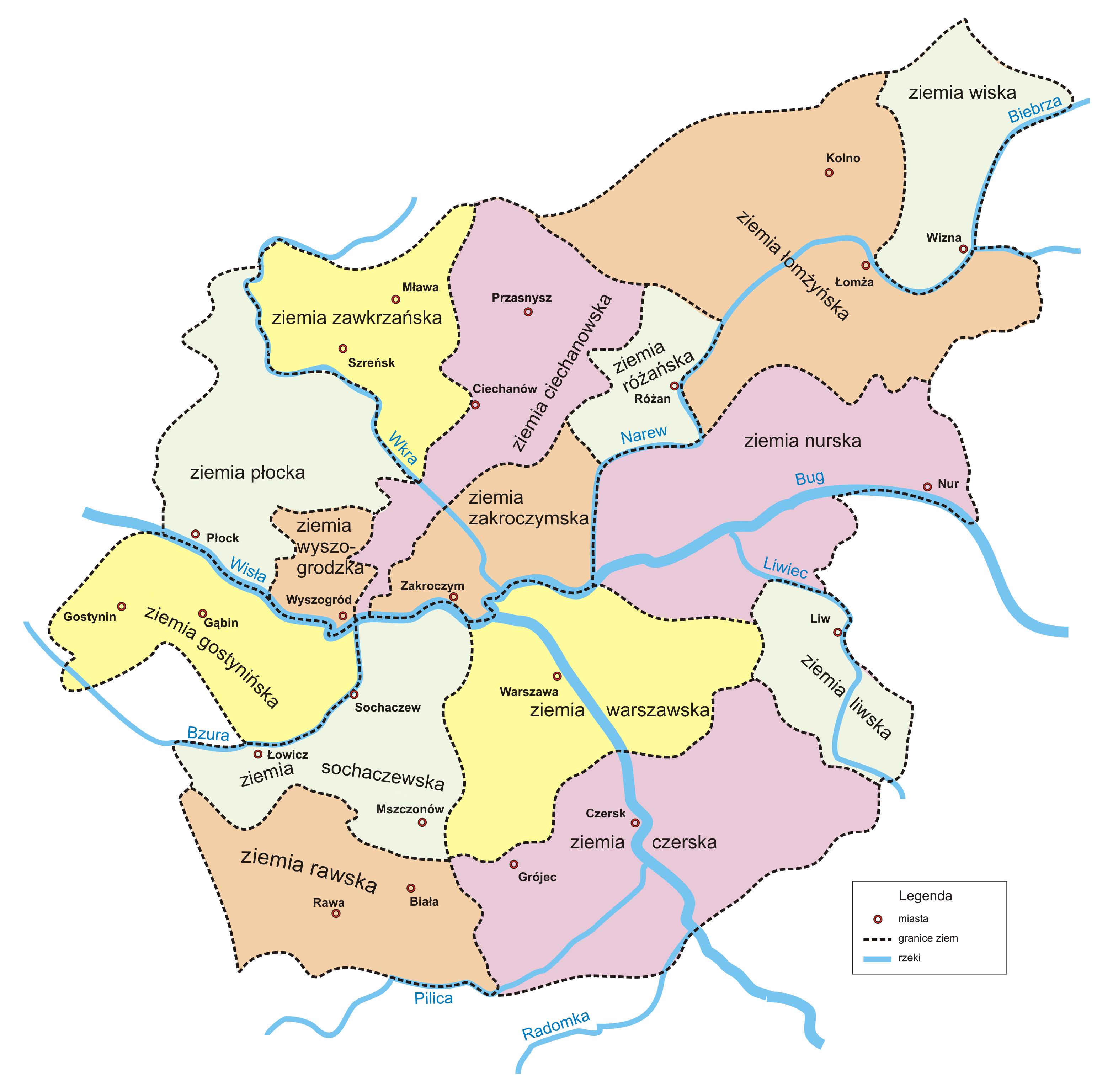
Historical lands of Masovia.

Ciechanów Land (Polish: Ziemia ciechanowska), named after the town of Ciechanów, located in central Poland, was an administrative unit (ziemia) of both the Kingdom of Poland and the Polish–Lithuanian Commonwealth. Divided into three counties, it belonged to the Masovian Voivodeship.

== History ==
The history of Ciechanów Land dates back to the late 13th century, when a system of castellanies was established in the province of Mazovia. Ciechanów became seat of a castellany, which stretched from the Vistula to the border with Prussia.

In the late 14th century, following the example of the Kingdom of Poland, Mazovian dukes decided to introduce a new system of lands, divided into counties. The Land of Ciechanów had an area of 2970 km^{2}, with three counties: Ciechanów, Przasnysz and Czerwinsk nad Wisla. Furthermore, in 1471–1495, the Duchy of Ciechanów existed, with a size of 8200 km^{2}, and such towns as Łomża, Zakroczym and Różan.

In 1526, following the death of Duke Janusz III of Masovia, all of Mazovia was annexed by Poland, and the Masovian Voivodeship was established. The Land of Ciechanów continued to exist, with its own castellan and local sejmik at Ciechanów, where two envoys were elected to the Warsaw Sejm.

The Land of Ciechanów was densely populated, with poor szlachtas making up to 30% of total population. Local residents colonized the neighboring lands of Podlasie, Lithuania, Prussia (see Masurians), Volhynia and Pomerelia.

In 1793, after the second partition of Poland, a new administrative system was introduced by the Polish Diet. The Ciechanów Voivodeship was established, made of the Lands of Ciechanów, Zawkrze, Różan, Zakroczym and Wyszogród, with a total area of 7200 km^{2}.

== Sources ==
- Górczyk, Wojciech (2011). "Ciechanów- zarys dziejów do XV w." Kultura i Historia (in Polish) (19).
