= Przemyśl Land =

Administrative region in Kievan Rus and Poland

Coordinates: 49°47′10″N 22°46′26″E

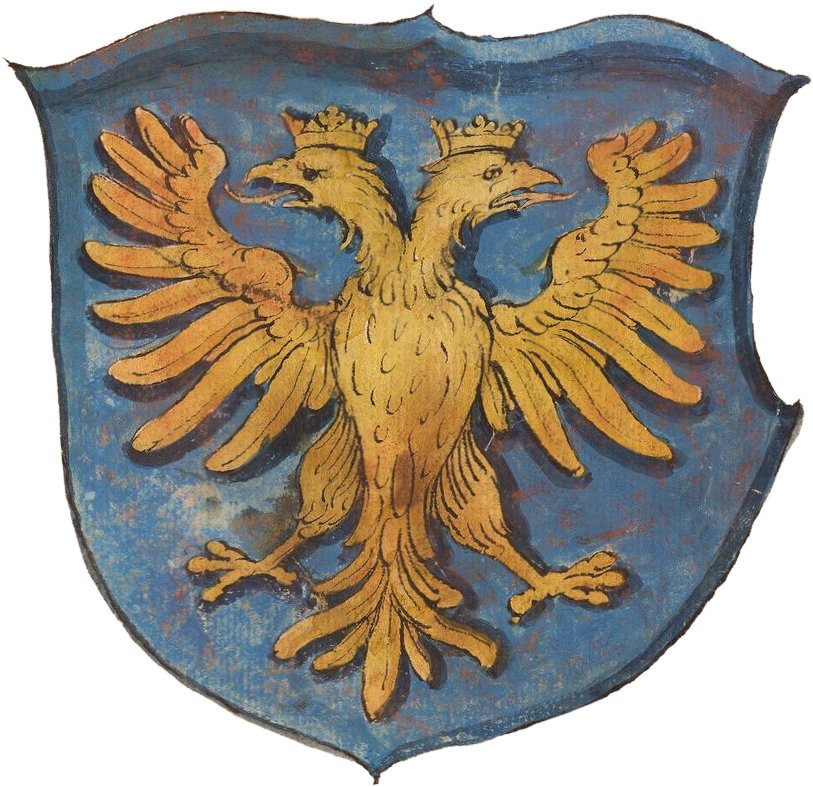
Coat of arms of both Przemyśl Land and Sanok Land

Przemyśl Land (Polish: Ziemia przemyska, Ukrainian: Перемишльська земля) was an administrative unit of Kyivan Rus, Kingdom of Poland and Polish–Lithuanian Commonwealth. It existed since the integration of Principality of Peremyshl into Kingdom of Ruthenia and until 1772, and was one of five lands (see ziemia) of Poland's Ruthenian Voivodeship. Its capital was at Przemyśl, where local sejmiks also took place. Together with Red Ruthenia, Przemyśl Land was annexed by King Kazimierz Wielki in 1340. It remained part of Poland in unchanged form until 1772, when, following the first partition of Poland, it became of Habsburg's province of Galicia.

In the 15th century, Przemyśl Land was divided into the following counties: Przemyśl, Jarosław, Leżajsk, Łańcut, Mosciska, Rzeszów, Przeworsk, Sambor, Drohobycz, Stryj, Tyczyn and Zydaczow (the last one was later transferred to Lwów Land). By the 17th century, the number of counties was reduced to four (Przemyśl, Sambor, Drohobycz, Stryj). According to the 1676 royal census, Przemyśl Land had 32 towns and 980 villages.

Przemyśl Land had the area of 12,070 km^{2} (4,660 sq mi); more than half of which was County of Przemyśl (almost 7,000 km^{2} (2,700 sq mi)). Sambor County had the area of 2,700 km^{2} (1,000 sq mi), Stryj County – 1,600 km^{2} (620 sq mi), and Drohobycz County – only 700 km^{2} (270 sq mi). In comparison to historic Lesser Polands voivodeships, Przemyśl Land was quite extensive – it was larger than neighboring Lublin Voivodeship, and half the size of Sandomierz Voivodeship. Boundaries of Przemyśl Land were not at first precise, so in 1541 royal commission marked its border with Lwów Land, in 1554 the border with Sanok Land was also marked. Some time in the mid-17th century, Przeworsk County was re-created out of northwestern part of Przemyśl County. It was densely populated, with 237 villages and 11 towns, and had its own tax office, located at Przeworsk.

Zygmunt Gloger gave the following description of Przemyśl Land: "Przemyśl Land was divided into two counties: those of Przemyśl and Przeworsk (...) In 1676, County of Przemyśl had 18 towns and 657 villages, while County of Przeworsk had 18 towns and 221 villages.

Przemyśl, known in Latin as Praemislia, and in Ruthenian as Peremysl, is located on the San river. It had an ancient castle and two cathedral churches – Roman-Catholic and Greek-Catholic. Przemyśl is one of the oldest towns, mentioned by Nestor the Chronicler, who wrote that before 981, it belonged to Poland. Since in those years gords were named after their founders (Kraków after Krak, Lwów after Lew), we can assume that it was named after a Lechite Duke Przemyslaw. Among towns of Przemyśl Land there also is Medyka, where in 1434 King Wladyslaw Jagiello listened to a nightingale, caught a cold and died at Grodek Jagiellonski.

== Sources ==
- Zygmunt Gloger's description of Przemyśl Land
