= Rawa Land =

Former administrative unit in Poland

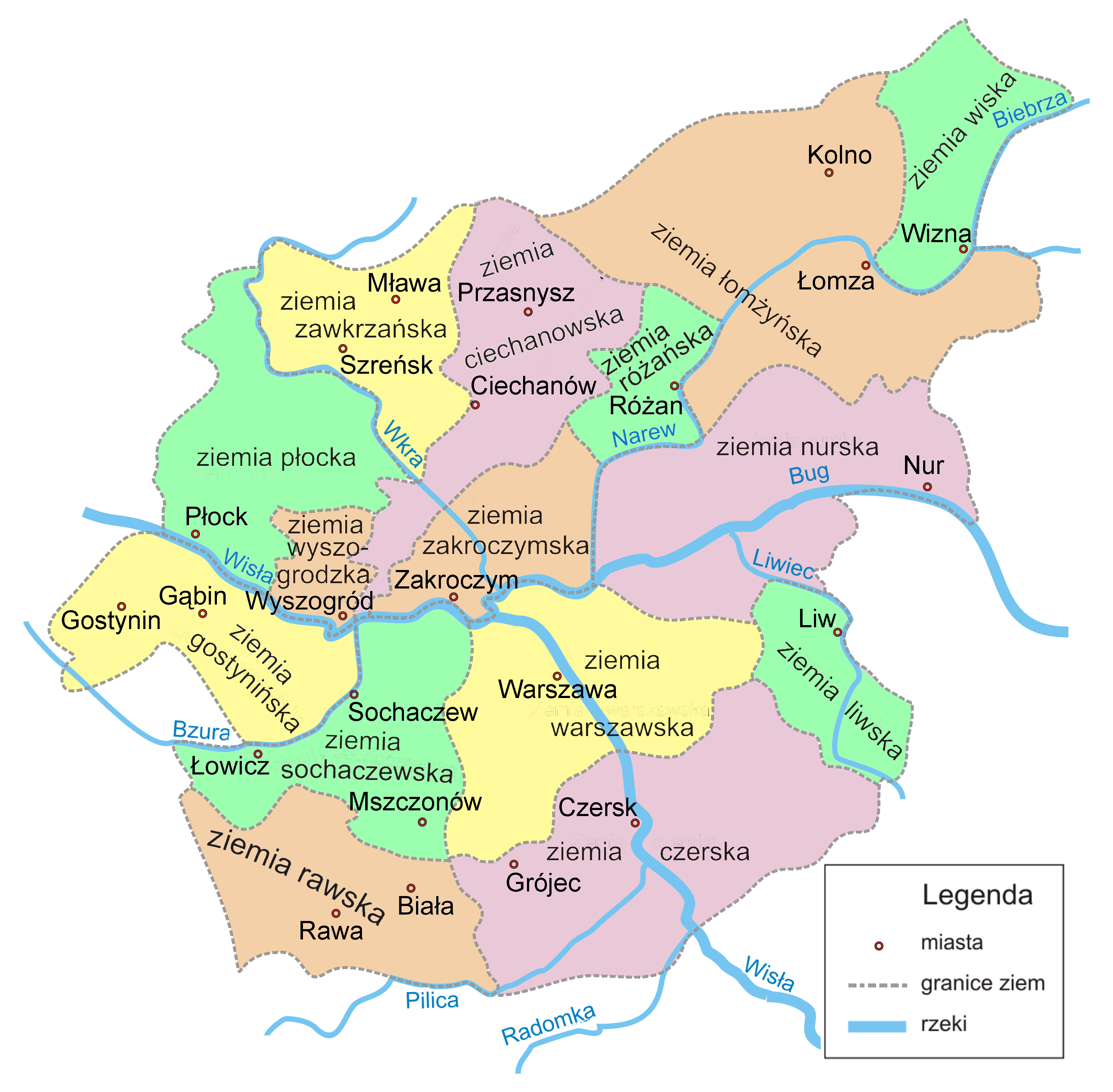
historical lands of Masovia

Rawa Land (Polish: ziemia rawska), named after Rawa Mazowiecka, was an administrative unit (ziemia) of the Duchy of Mazovia, Kingdom of Poland and the Polish–Lithuanian Commonwealth. With its capital in Rawa, it belonged to Rawa Voivodeship. Rawa Land was divided into two counties: Rawa Mazowiecka and Biala Rawska.

The history of Rawa Land dates back to 1377, when its boundaries were established during a meeting of Mazovian dukes in Sochaczew. In 1462, Rawa Land and Gostynin Land were incorporated into Poland, and Rawa Voivodeship was created. The voivodeship with its three lands existed until the second partition of Poland in 1793, when it was annexed by the Kingdom of Prussia.

== Sources ==
- Rawa County and its history (in Polish)
