= Masovian Voivodeship (1526–1795) =

Former administrative region of the Kingdom of Poland

Coordinates: 52°14′00″N 21°01′00″E

Masovian Voivodeship Palatinatus Masoviensis Województwo Mazowieckie
- Voivodeship of Kingdom of Poland¹
- 1526; 500 years ago–1795; 231 years ago
- Banner Coat of arms

- The Masovian Voivodeship in the Polish–Lithuanian Commonwealth in 1635.
- Capital: Warsaw
- Area
- 23,200 km^{2} (9,000 sq mi)
- History
  - Established: 1526; 500 years ago
  - Third partition: October 24 1795; 231 years ago
- Political subdivisions: Ten lands divided into 22 counties
Preceded by
Duchy of Masovia	Duchy of Masovia
Succeeded by
New East Prussia
New Galicia
South Prussia
- ¹ Voivodeship of the Kingdom of Poland. The kingdom was part of the Polish–Lithuanian Commonwealth from 1569.

Masovian Voivodeship (Polish: Województwo Mazowieckie) was an administrative region of the Kingdom of Poland, and of the Polish–Lithuanian Commonwealth, from 1526 to the partitions of the Polish–Lithuanian Commonwealth to 1795. Together with Płock and Rawa Voivodeships, it formed the province of Masovia. Its area was divided into ten lands. The seat of the voivode was Warsaw, local sejmiks also convened in Warsaw, at St. Martin's church.

== History ==
The voivodeship was officially created by King Sigismund I the Old on December 27, 1529, three years after the incorporation of the Duchy of Masovia into the kingdom. In the Senate of the Polish–Lithuanian Commonwealth, it had eight senators. These were: the Voivode of Mazovia, the Castellan of Czersk, and Castellans of Wizna, Wyszogród, Zakroczym, Warszawa, Ciechanów, and Liw.

In the general division of the Commonwealth into three provinces: Lesser Poland, Greater Poland, and the Grand Duchy of Lithuania, Mazovia was regarded as part of Province of Greater Poland. This vast land was part of the Kingdom of Poland from the 10th until the 12th century (...) Divided into several smaller parts, it nevertheless remained a separate entity, ruled by one dynasty, with one political, social and legal system. In the years 1462, 1495 and 1526, Mazovian lands were gradually incorporated back into Poland, and divided into three voivodeships – Rawa Mazowiecka, Płock and Mazovia.

In the 16th century, whole Mazovia had the area of 578 sq. miles, and all three Mazovian voivodeships were divided into 33 counties, with 446 Roman-Catholic parishes, 94 towns and 5990 villages. At the same time, Greater Poland proper had the area of 1051 sq. miles, with 6471 villages, while Lesser Poland proper, with the area of 1013 sq. miles, had 5500 villages. As we see, Mazovia, much smaller than Greater and Lesser Poland, had the same number of villages. Per square mile, there were 6 villages in Greater Poland, 5 villages in Lesser Poland, and as many as 10 villages in Mazovia. In Ciechanów County, there were 23 villages per sq. mile, which was the highest number in the whole kingdom (...)

The population of Mazovia would be even higher, if it had not been for the proximity of Podlasie, Rus’, and Lithuania. Since the 14th century, local nobility would settle in those areas in great numbers. Still, Mazovia was among the most densely populated provinces of Poland, together with Łęczyca Land, Kujawy and Dobrzyń Land.

— Zygmunt Gloger

== Municipal government ==
Seat of the Voivodeship Governor (Wojewoda):

- Warsaw

== Administrative division ==
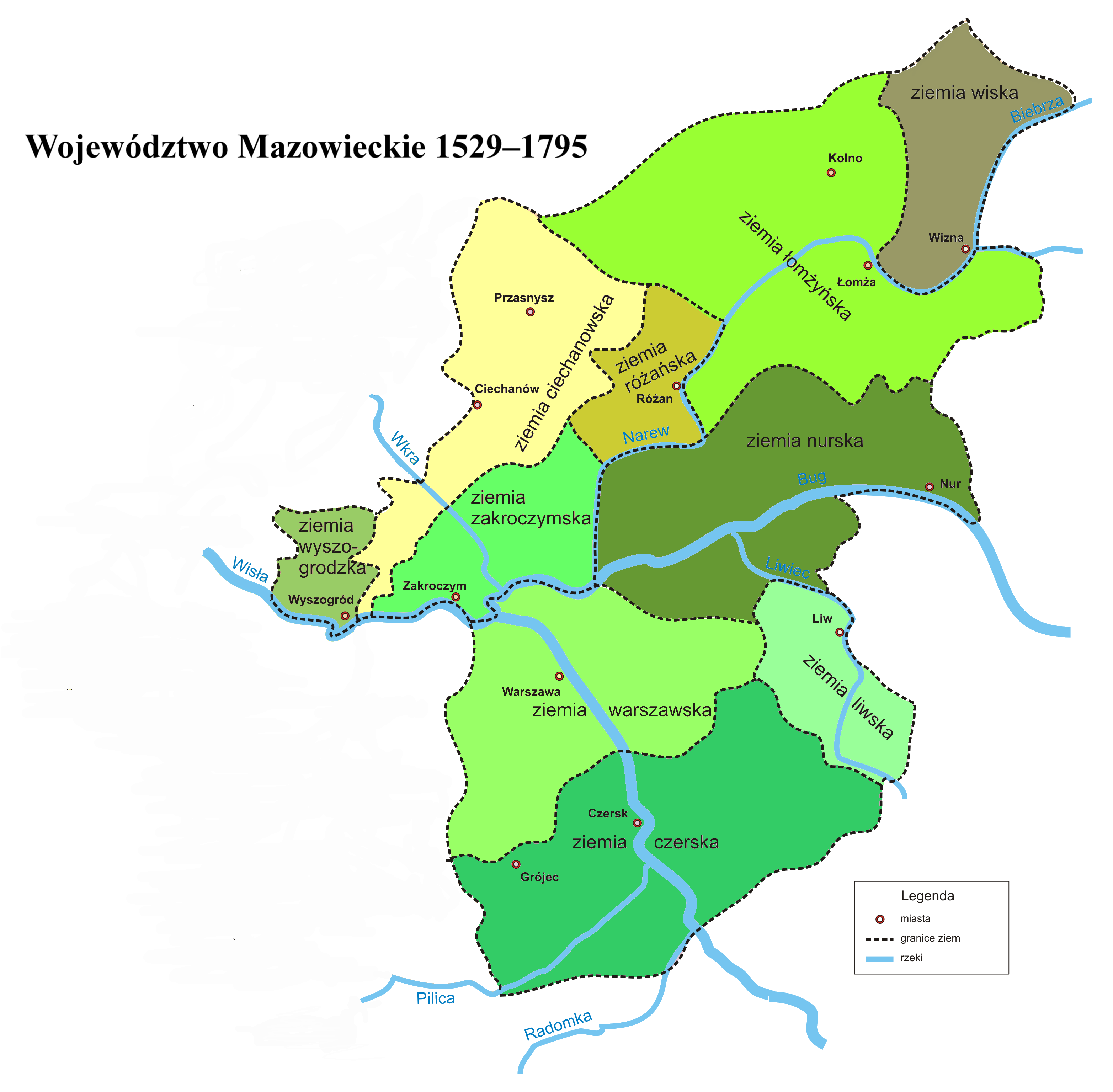
Lands of the Masovian Voivodeship

- Ciechanów Land (ziemia ciechanowska, Ciechanów)
- Czersk Land (ziemia czerska, Czersk)
- Liw Land (ziemia liwska, Liw)
- Łomża Land (ziemia łomżyńska, Łomża)
- Nur Land (ziemia nurska, Nur)
- Różan Land (ziemia różańska, Różan)
- Warszawa Land (ziemia warszawska, Warsaw)
- Wizna Land (ziemia wiska, Wizna)
- Wyszogród Land (ziemia wyszogrodzka, Wyszogród)
- Zakroczym Land (ziemia zakroczymska, Zakroczym)

== Voivodes ==
- Feliks Brzeski (1517–1545)
- Stanisław Warszycki (1630–1651)
- Stanisław Poniatowski (from 1731)
- Andrzej Mokronowski (from 1781)

== Sources ==
- Masovian Voivodeship, description by Zygmunt Gloger
