= Nur, Poland =

Nur
- Village
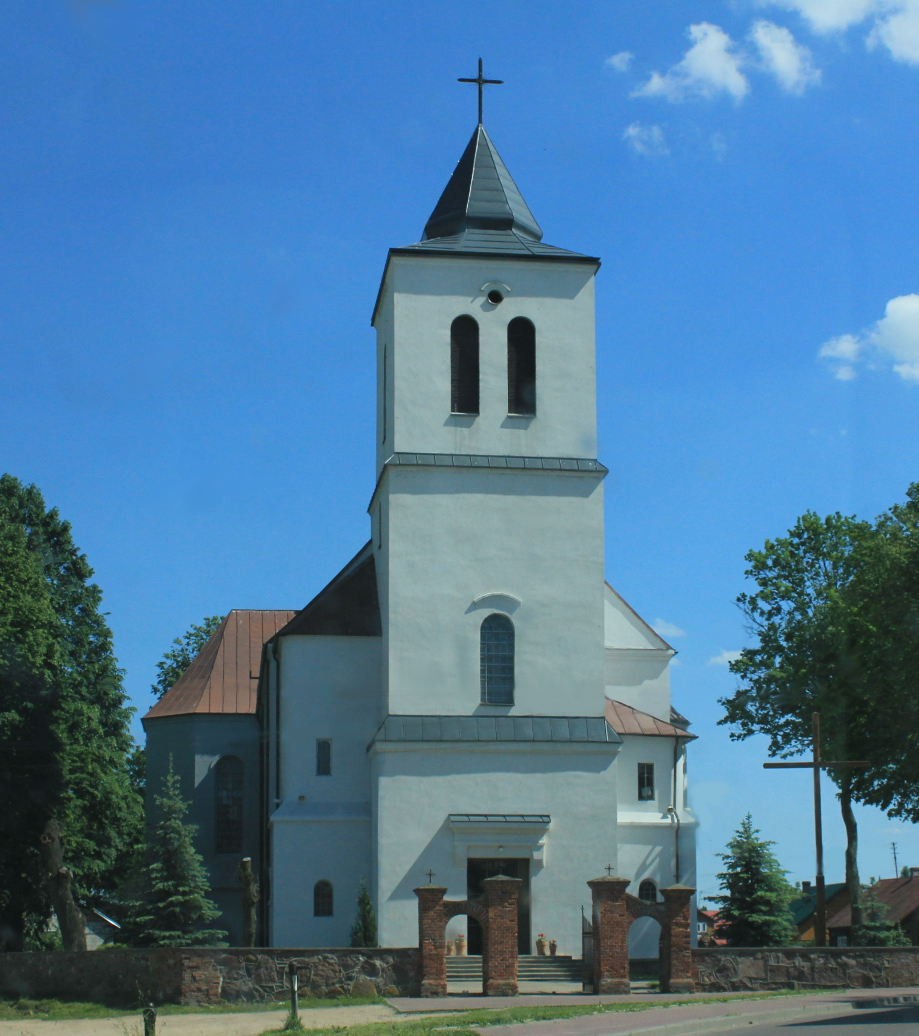
- Church of Saint John the Apostle

- Location within Poland
- Coordinates: 52°40′N 22°18′E
- Country: Poland
- Voivodeship: Masovian
- County: Ostrów
- Gmina: Nur

Population
  - Total: 760
- Time zone: UTC+1 (CET)
  - Summer (DST): UTC+2 (CEST)
- Postal code: 07-322
- Vehicle registration: WOR
- Website: http://www.gminanur.pl

Nur [nur] is a village in Ostrów County, Masovian Voivodeship, in east-central Poland. It is the seat of the gmina (administrative district) called Gmina Nur.

In 2006, the village had a population of 760.

== History ==
Nur has a long and rich history. In the Kingdom of Poland, it was one of main administrative centers of the province of Mazovia, and the seat of a separate administrative district (ziemia). In the early Middle Ages, Nur was a trade center, with a Roman Catholic parish established here probably in the 12th century.

Nur received its town charter either in 1410, or 1425. A local vogt was established, with town council. Until 1526, Nur was part of the Duchy of Mazovia, which was a Polish vassal state. After annexation of Mazovia into Poland, and creation of Masovian Voivodeship, the Land of Nur consisted of three counties: Kamieniec Mazowiecki, Ostrów Mazowiecka, and Nur, which also was the seat of a starosta, Sejmik, and land court for the three counties. Nur was a county seat and royal town of the Kingdom of Poland, administratively located in the Masovian Voivodeship in the Greater Poland Province.

The Land of Nur had been established in 1377, during a meeting of Mazovian dukes in Sochaczew. Its total area was 3,500 km^{2} (1,400 sq mi): Kamieniec Castellany, later renamed into Kamieniec County, had the area of 2,000 km^{2} (770 sq mi), Nur County 1,000 km^{2} (390 sq mi), and Ostrów County 500 km^{2} (190 sq mi). Boundaries of the Land of Nur remained unchanged for over 400 years, until the Partitions of Poland.

In the 16th century, during the Polish Golden Age, Nur prospered. The town had 263 houses, a number of craftsmen and merchants, a brewery, a folwark, eight watermills and four fairs a year. Due to its convenient location along the Bug river waterway, Nur was an important trade center, with goods sent along the Bug and the Vistula to the Baltic Sea port of Gdańsk.

In December 1640, King Władysław IV Vasa announced that the sejmiks be moved from Nur to Ostrów Mazowiecka, but in 1647, the Sejm in Warsaw decided to move them back to Nur. In 1648, during the Khmelnytsky Uprising, the Land of Nur equipped 100 cavalrymen, sending them south to fight the enemy.

The Swedish invasion of Poland (1655–1660) was a disaster for the town. It was completely destroyed, and has never regained its prominence. The parish church was not rebuilt until 1693, and by 1777, the number of houses was only 63. The last starosta of Nur, Karol Wodzyński, participated in Kościuszko Uprising (1794).

Since 1815, Nur belonged to Russian-controlled Congress Poland. In 1827, its population was 514, with 75 houses. The town continued its decline: in 1853, the church was dismantled, and replaced with a wooden chapel. By 1860, the population grew to 813, including 299 Jews. In 1869, following January Uprising, Nur lost its town charter. Following World War I, Poland regained independence and control of Nur.

During the German occupation of Poland (World War II), on 4 August 1944, German troops committed a massacre of some 120 Poles, and even animals were killed (see also Nazi crimes against the Polish nation).
