= Liw Land =

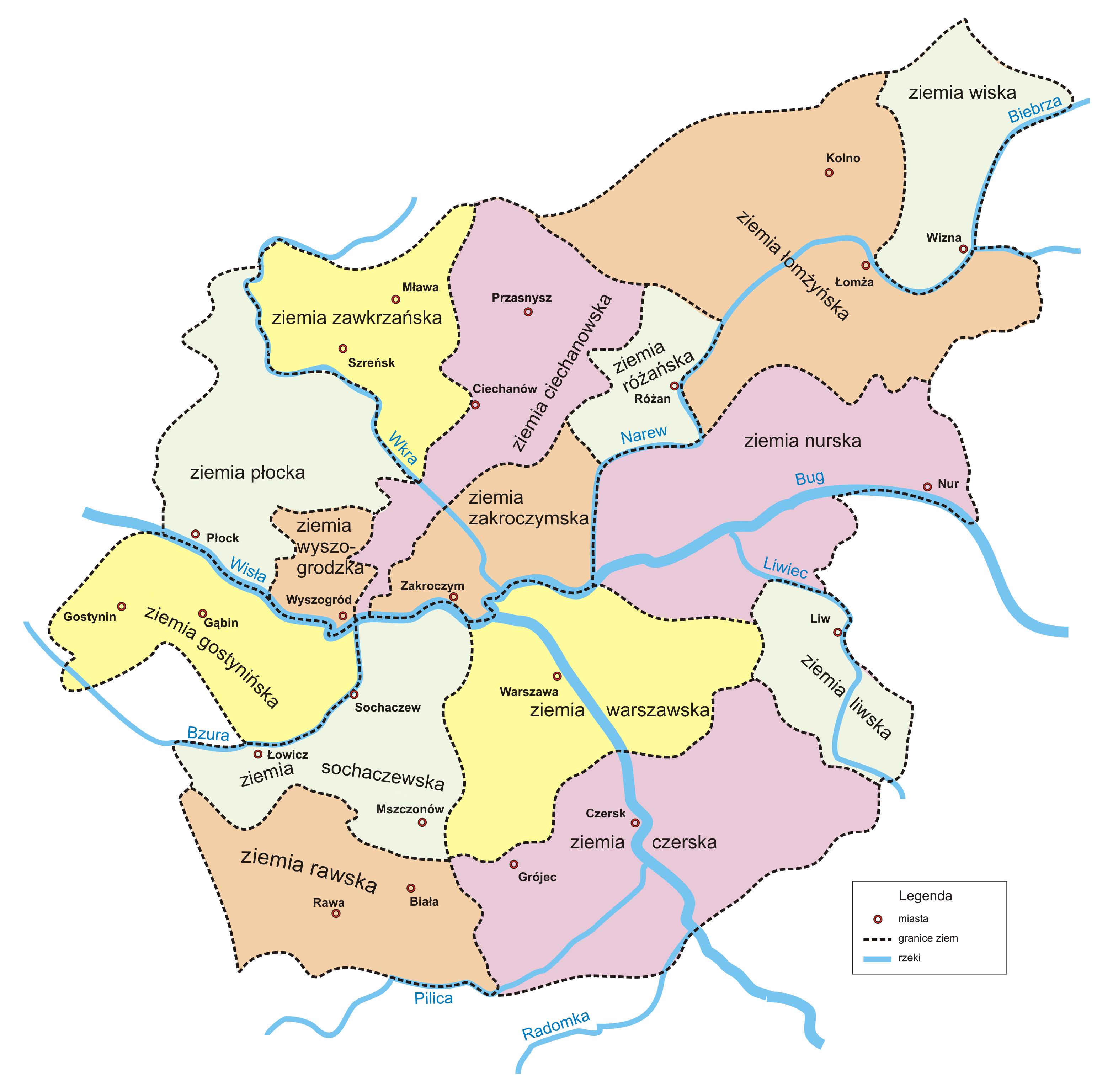
historical lands of Masovia

Liw Land (Polish: ziemia liwska), named after the town of Liw, was an administrative unit (ziemia) of both the Kingdom of Poland and the Polish–Lithuanian Commonwealth. It was part of Masovian Voivodeship, and existed from the 14th century until the Partitions of Poland. Liw Land was located in eastern part of the historic province of Mazovia. It had an area of 1038 sq. kilometers, and due to its small size, was not divided into counties. Local sejmiks took place at Liw.

== Sources ==
- Adolf Pawiński: Polska XVI wieku pod względem geograficzno-statystycznym. T. 5: Mazowsze. Warszawa: Księgarnia Gebethnera i Wolffa, 1895
