= Zakroczym Land =

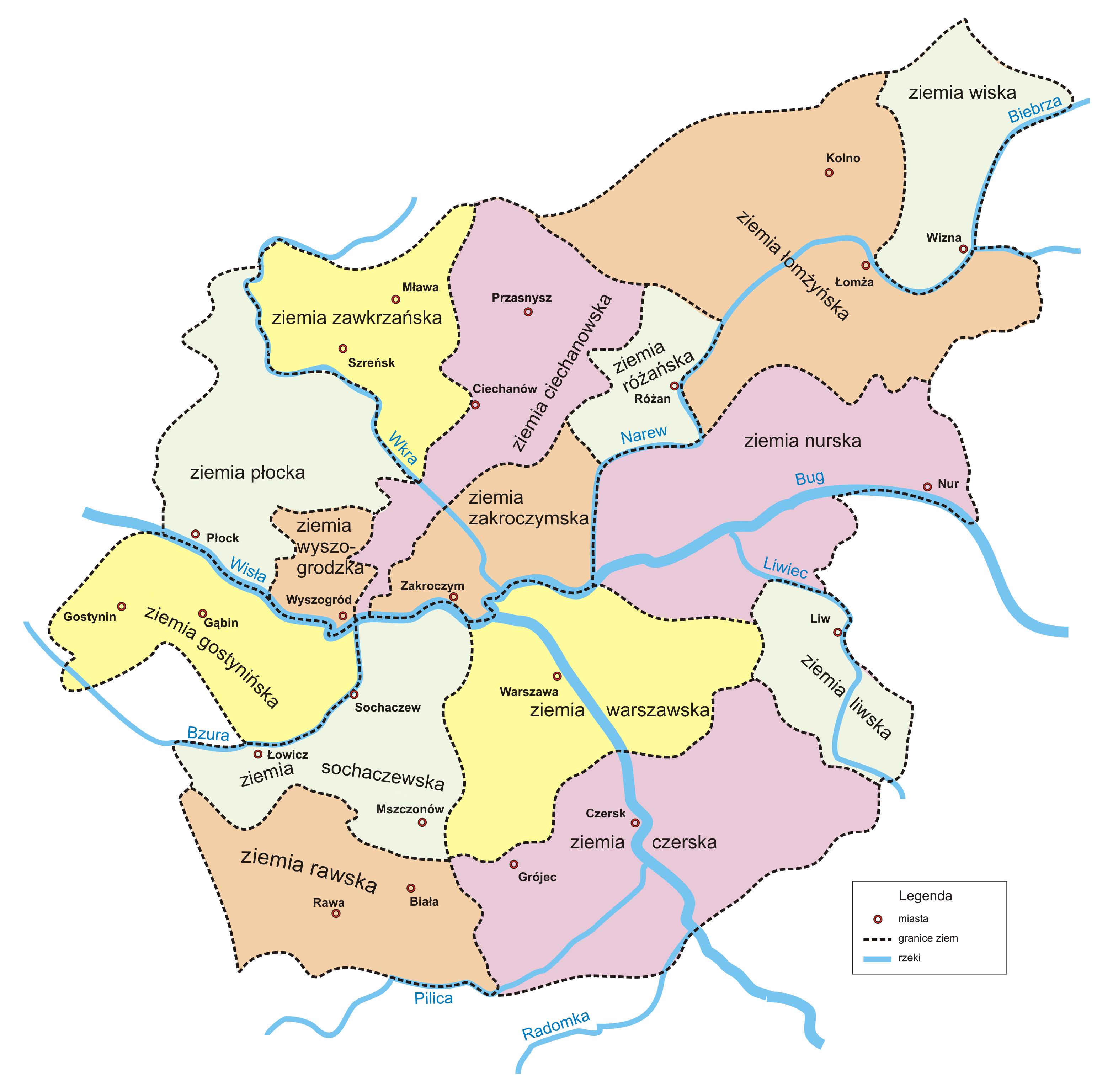
Historical lands of Masovia

Zakroczym Land (Polish: ziemia zakroczymska), named after the town of Zakroczym), was an administrative unit (ziemia) of the Duchy of Masovia, Kingdom of Poland and the Polish–Lithuanian Commonwealth. It was part of Masovian Voivodeship, and its history dates back to the late Middle Ages, when Zakroczym became seat of a castellan. Local sejmiks took place in Zakroczym.

Total area of the Land of Zakroczym was 1155 square kilometers. Located in central Mazovia, it was divided into three counties: Zakroczym, Serock, and Nowe Miasto. All three towns had royal status, and were seats of castellans. The biggest city of Zakroczym Land however was Pułtusk, with its residence of the Bishops of Płock and Jesuit College.

== Sources ==
- Adolf Pawiński: Polska XVI wieku pod względem geograficzno-statystycznym. T. 5: Mazowsze. Warsaw: Księgarnia Gebethnera i Wolffa, 1895
