= Wyszogród Land =

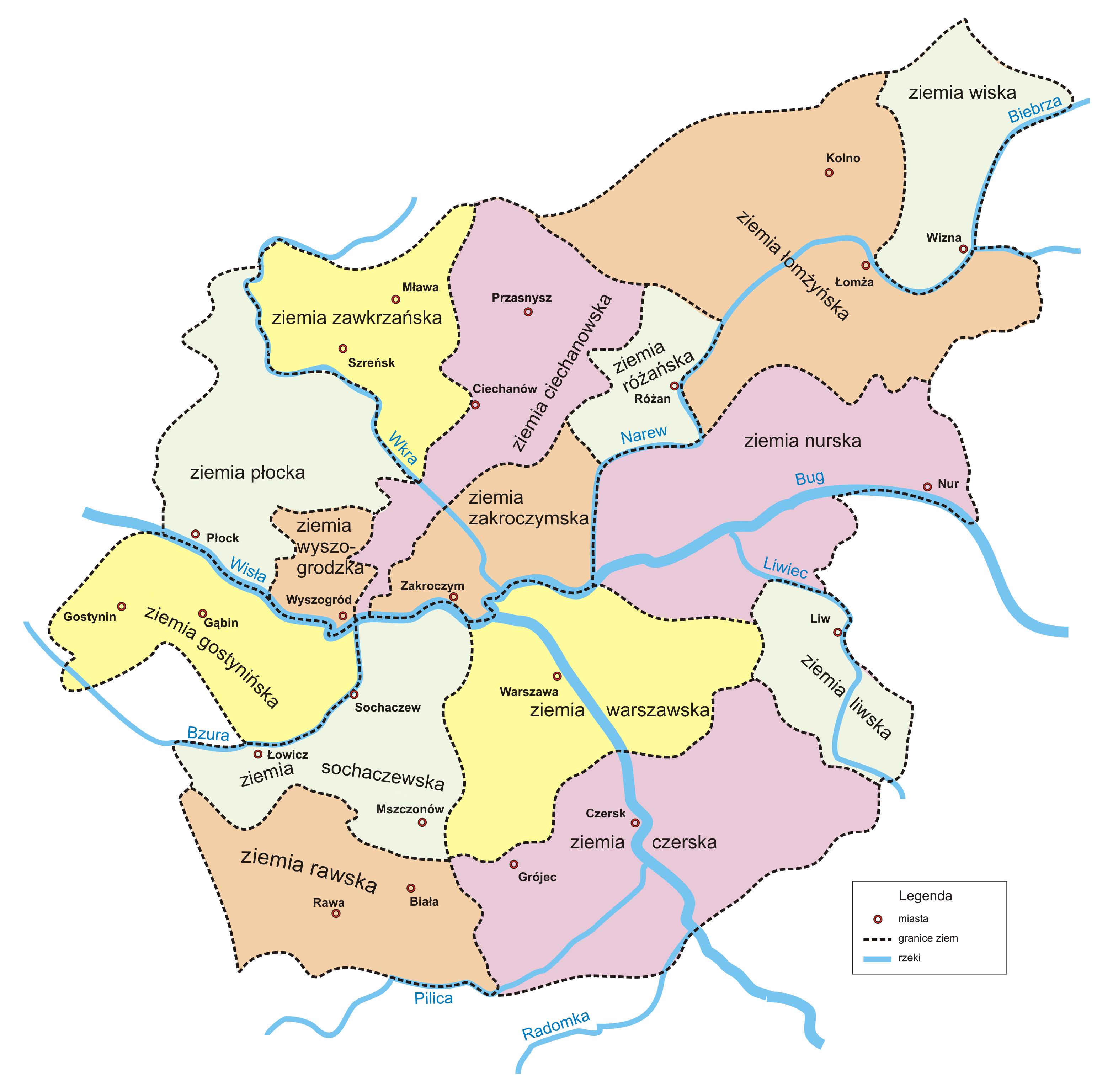
historical lands of Masovia

Wyszogród Land (Polish: ziemia wyszogrodzka), named after Wyszogród, was an administrative unit (ziemia) of the Duchy of Mazovia, Kingdom of Poland and the Polish–Lithuanian Commonwealth. It was part of Masovian Voivodeship, and its history dates back to the late Middle Ages, when Wyszogród became seat of a castellan. The province was not divided into counties, and local sejmiks took place in Wyszogród.

== Sources ==
- Adolf Pawiński: Polska XVI wieku pod względem geograficzno-statystycznym. T. 5: Mazowsze. Warszawa: Księgarnia Gebethnera i Wolffa, 1895
