= Różan Land =

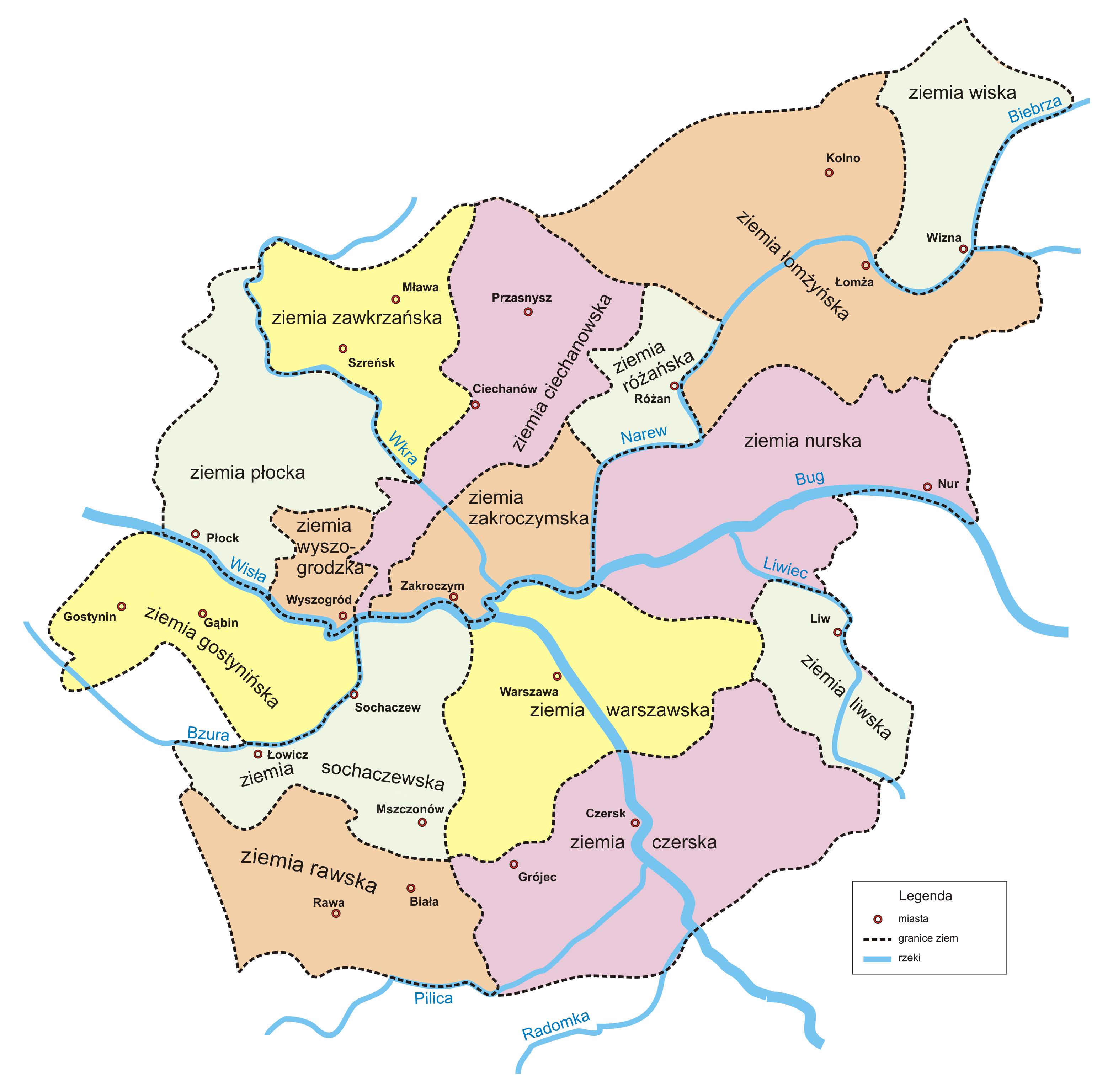
historical lands of Masovia

Różan Land (Polish: ziemia różańska), named after the town of Różan, was an administrative unit (ziemia) of the Duchy of Mazovia, Kingdom of Poland and the Polish–Lithuanian Commonwealth. With its capital in Rozan, it belonged to Masovian Voivodeship. Rozan Land was divided into two counties: Rozan and Makow Mazowiecki.

The Land of Rozan, which had originally been part of the Castellany of Ciechanow, was established in the second half of the 14th century. Its area was 922 km^{2}, and its boundaries did not change until the second partition of Poland in 1793. Local sejmiks took place at Rozan.

== Sources ==
- History of Rozan and its land (in Polish)
- Adolf Pawiński: Polska XVI wieku pod względem geograficzno-statystycznym. T. 5: Mazowsze. Warszawa: Księgarnia Gebethnera i Wolffa, 1895
