= Warsaw Land =

Former Polish administrative unit

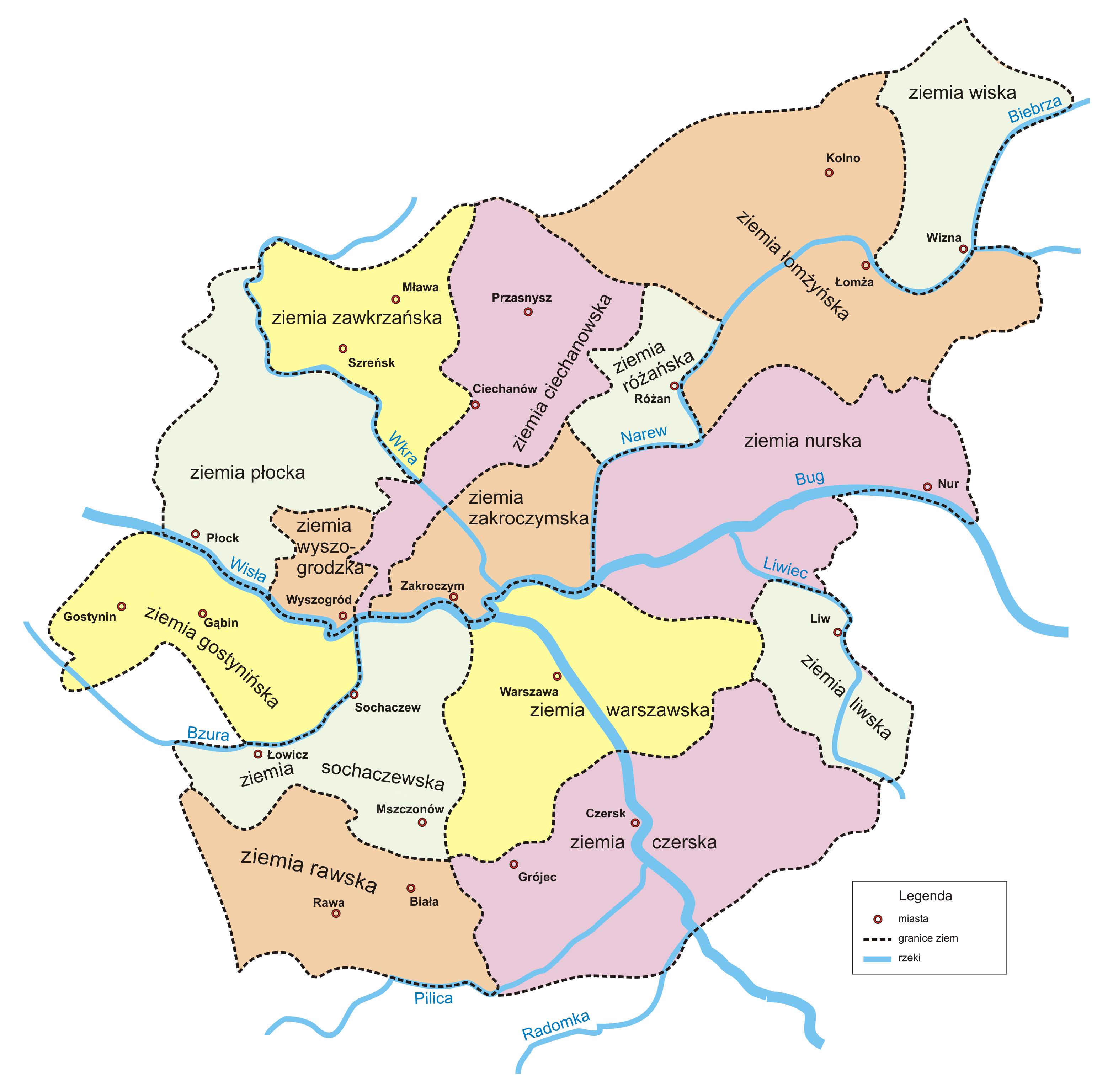
historical lands of Masovia

Warsaw Land (Polish: ziemia warszawska), named after Warsaw, was an administrative unit (ziemia) of the Duchy of Mazovia, Kingdom of Poland and the Polish–Lithuanian Commonwealth. With its capital in Warsaw, it belonged to Masovian Voivodeship. Warszawa Land was divided into three counties: Warsaw, Tarczyn and Blonie.

The boundaries of Warszawa Land were established in the 14th century, and remained unchanged until the Partitions of Poland. Its total area was 2860 km^{2}, and in the 16th century, its southwestern corner was densely populated by poor szlachtas. Warsaw was located in the middle of the province.

== Sources ==
- Adolf Pawiński: Polska XVI wieku pod względem geograficzno-statystycznym. T. 5: Mazowsze. Warszawa: Księgarnia Gebethnera i Wolffa, 1895
