= Wschowa Land =

Wschowa Land (Polish: ziemia wschowska), named after the town of Wschowa, was an administrative unit (ziemia) of the Kingdom of Poland and the Polish–Lithuanian Commonwealth. With its capital in Wschowa, it belonged to Poznan Voivodeship. Wschowa Land was located along the border with Silesia. It was not divided into counties and had an area of 489 km^{2}.

The Land of Wschowa was annexed into Poland by King Kazimierz Wielki in 1343. Before that, it had been ruled by the dukes of Glogow. Polish kings allowed Wschowa to make its own money, on the condition that the coins were to be marked with a Polish eagle. In 1422, King Wladyslaw Jagiello subjected Wschowa Land to Polish legal regulations, and the unit became part of Poznan Voivodeship, while retaining some of its ancient rules. Wschowa Land ceased to exist after the Partitions of Poland, when it was annexed by the Kingdom of Prussia.
