= Łomża Land =

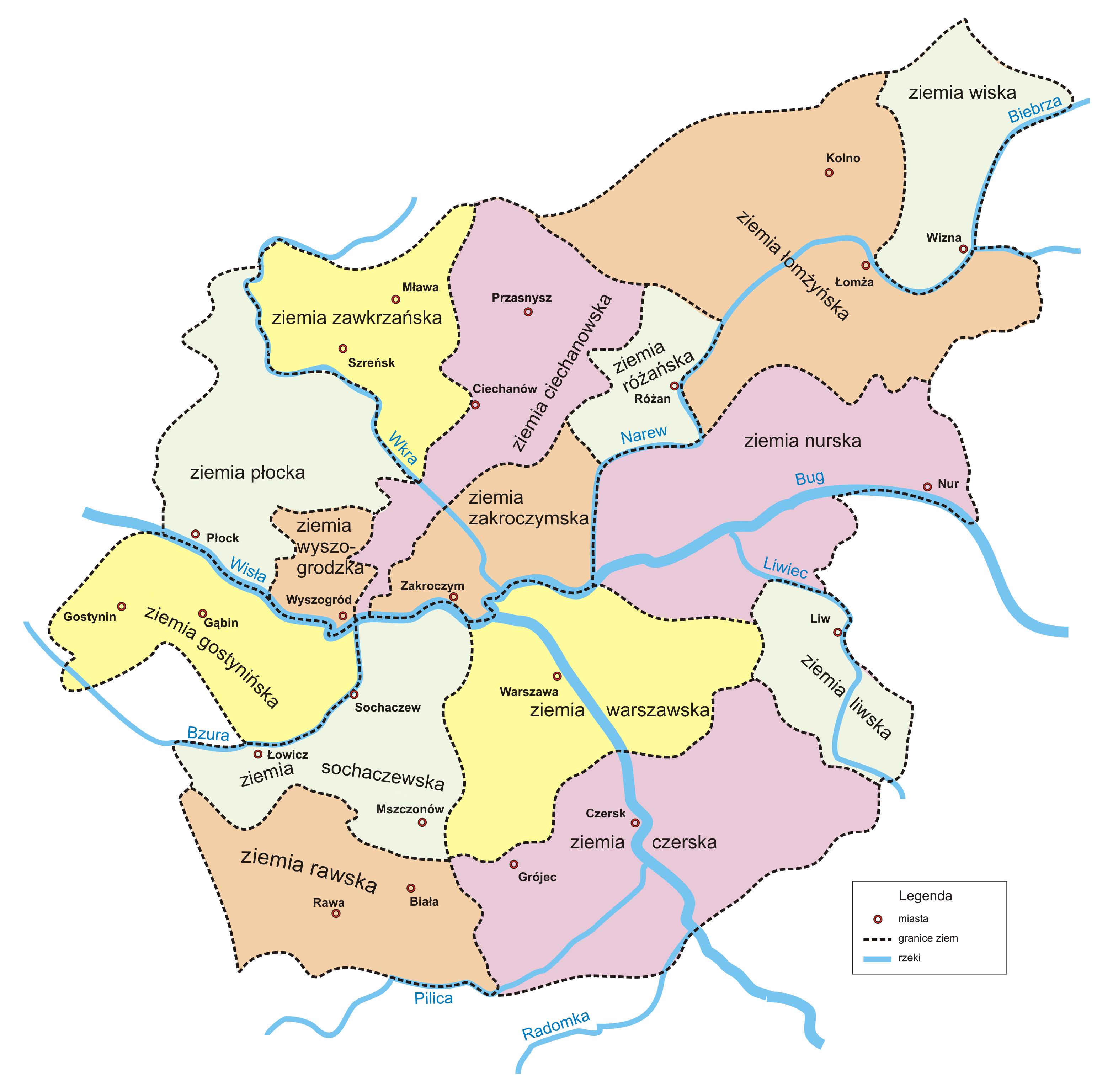
historical lands of Masovia

Łomża Land (Polish: ziemia łomżyńska), named after the town of Łomża, was an administrative unit (ziemia) of the Duchy of Masovia, the Kingdom of Poland and the Polish–Lithuanian Commonwealth. It was part of Masovian Voivodeship, and existed from the 14th century until the Partitions of Poland. Łomża Land was the largest province of the historic region of Mazovia.

The gord at Łomża was established some time in the 11th century, and by the 12th century, it became the seat of a castellan. In 1379, Siemowit III, Duke of Masovia divided the Duchy of Mazovia between his sons, granting Łomża to Janusz I of Warsaw. The term Łomża Land (or Land of Łomża) was first used in documents from 1414. Until 1526, the region remained part of the Duchy of Mazovia, which was annexed into the Kingdom of Poland, and turned into Masovian Voivodeship, in which it remained until the Partitions of Poland.

In the 16th century, Łomża Land had an area of 4260 sq. kilometers, and was divided into four counties: Łomża, Kolno, Zambrów and Ostrołęka.

== Sources ==
- Adolf Pawiński: Polska XVI wieku pod względem geograficzno-statystycznym. T. 5: Mazowsze. Warszawa: Księgarnia Gebethnera i Wolffa, 1895
