= Czersk Land =

Administrative unit of the Kingdom of Poland and the Polish–Lithuanian Commonwealth

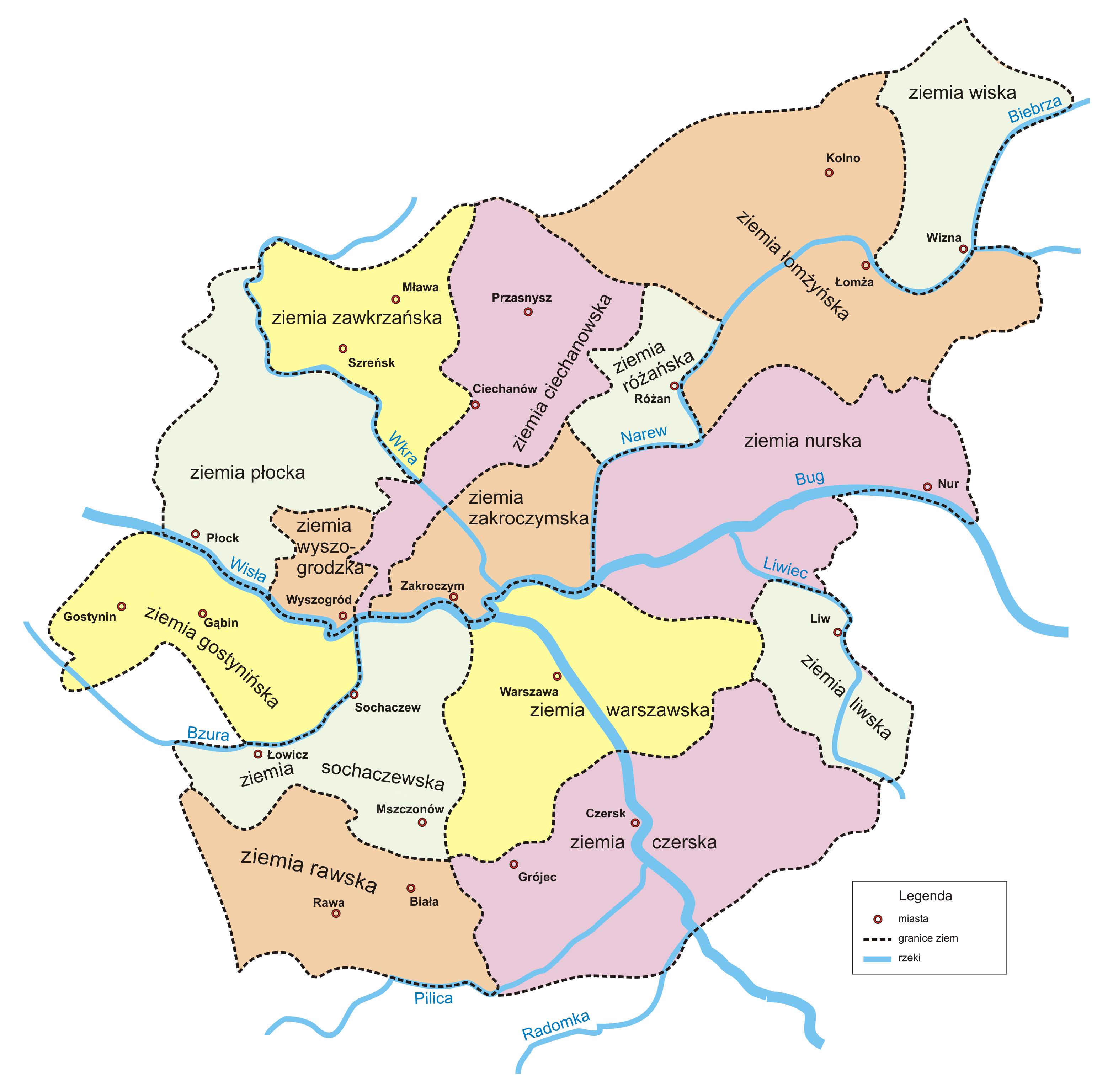
Historical lands of Masovia

Czersk Land (Polish: ziemia czerska, named after the town of Czersk) was an administrative unit (ziemia) of the Kingdom of Poland and the Polish–Lithuanian Commonwealth. With its capital in the town of Czersk, it belonged to the Masovian Voivodeship.

The history of Czersk Land as a separate administrative unit dates back to 1245, when Duke Konrad I of Masovia moved the seat of the castellany from Grójec to Czersk, making Czersk the major urban and political center of southern Mazovia. In 1377, Siemowit III, Duke of Masovia called a council in Sochaczew, during which he disbanded castellanies, and following the example of the Kingdom of Poland, created ten lands, all divided into counties. Therefore, the Land of Czersk was established, with three counties: Czersk, Warka and Grójec. It stretched from Mińsk Mazowiecki to Grojec, along both banks of the Vistula, including the town of Garwolin.

Czersk Land was the second biggest land of the province of Mazovia, after the Land of Łomża. Its total area was 4042 sq. kilometers; Czersk County had an area of 2440 km^{2}., Grojec County 697 km^{2}., and Warka County, 904 km^{2}.

In 1526, Czersk Land was annexed into Poland, continuing to exist as a separate administrative unit within Mazovian Voivodeship, with local sejmiks taking place at Czersk, and two envoys sent to the Sejm in Warsaw.

== Sources ==
- Adolf Pawiński: Polska XVI wieku pod względem geograficzno-statystycznym. T. 5: Mazowsze. Warszawa: Księgarnia Gebethnera i Wolffa, 1895
