= Różan =

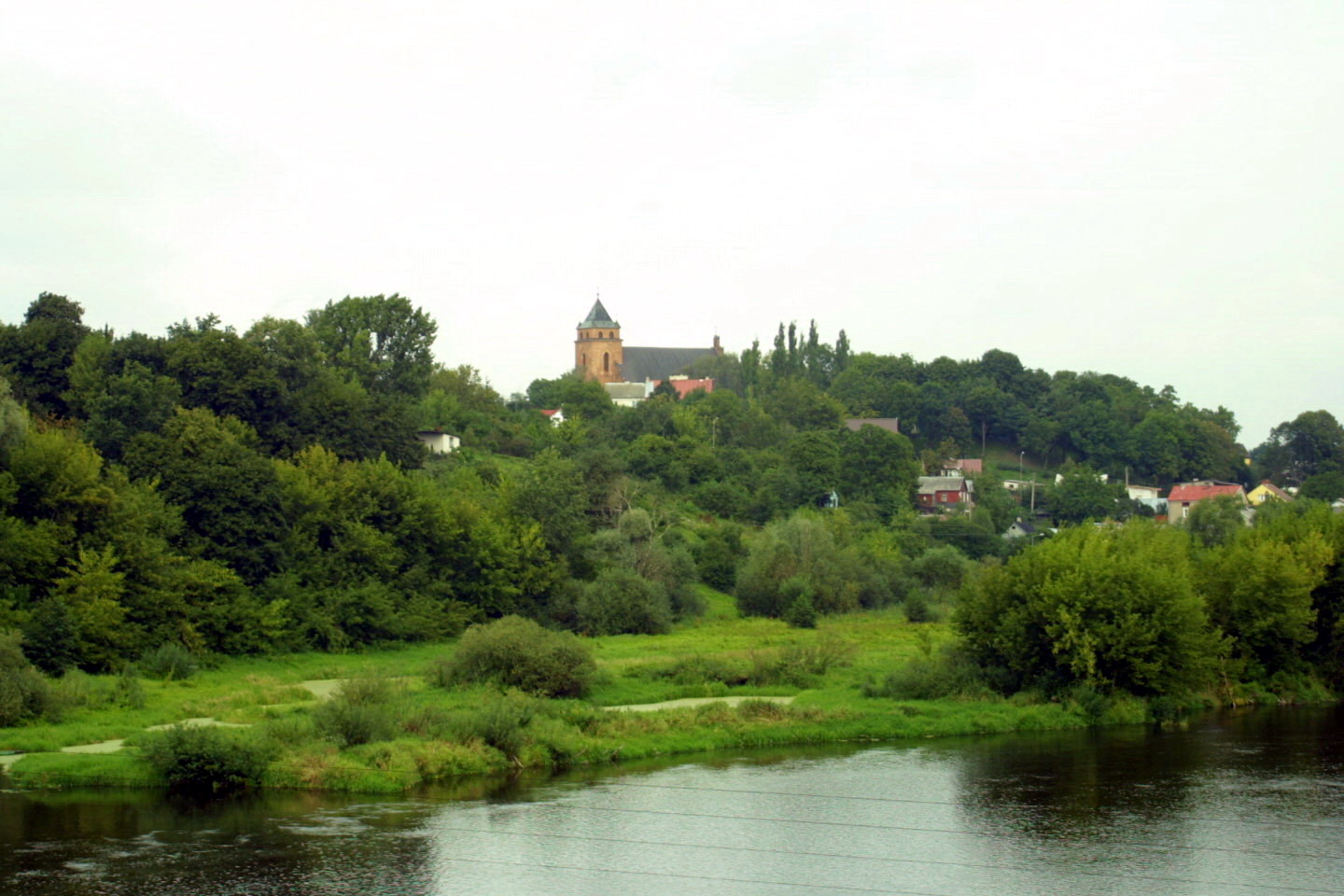
- View with Narew river

- Coat of arms

- Location within Poland
- Coordinates: 52°53′25″N 21°23′45″E
- Country: Poland
- Voivodeship: Masovian
- County: Maków
- Gmina: Różan
- Town rights: 1378

Government
  - Mayor: Jerzy Kazimierz Parciński

Area
  - Total: 6.67 km^{2} (2.58 sq mi)

Population (2006)
  - Total: 2,661
  - Density: 399/km^{2} (1,030/sq mi)
- Time zone: UTC+1 (CET)
  - Summer (DST): UTC+2 (CEST)
- Postal code: 06-230
- Area code: +48 29
- Car plates: WMA
- Website: www.rozan.eur.pl

Różan [ˈruʐan] is a town in Mazovian Voivodeship, northeastern Poland, on the river Narew. National roads 60 and 61 intersect in the town.

== History ==
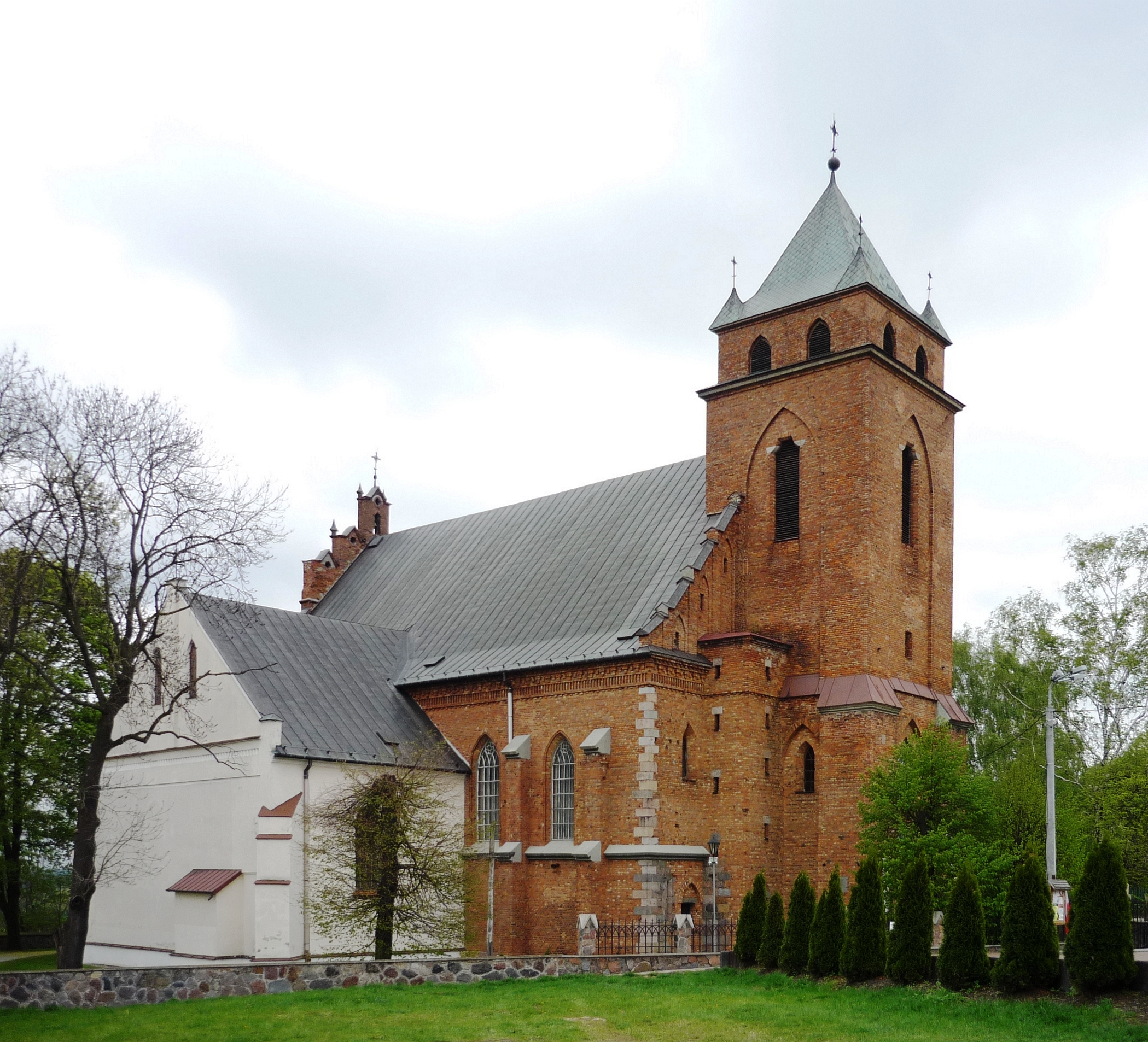
Saint Anne's Church

In the late Middle Ages, Różan emerged as an important trade center of northeastern Mazovia. Enjoying the support of Mazovian Dukes, especially Janusz I of Warsaw, in 1378 it received town charter, and became a capital of a separate province, the Land of Różan. In 1525, Mazovia was directly incorporated to the Kingdom of Poland and became part of the Masovian Voivodeship of the Greater Poland Province. Różan became a royal town of the Polish Crown and seat of a starosta. In 1565, the town had 330 houses and a population of about 2,000. It also probably had as many as six churches, and a castle, which guarded the nearby border with Ducal Prussia, a Polish fief. Furthermore, there was a bridge over the Narew, which fortified the importance of Rozan as a trade and administrative center.

The town prospered until the disastrous Swedish invasion of Poland (1655–1660), when it was ransacked and burned by the invaders. Following the Partitions of Poland and the Congress of Vienna, Rozan in 1815 became part of Russian-controlled Congress Poland, where it remained until World War I. During the January Uprising, clashes between Polish insurgents and Russian troops took place near Różan on April 24 and August 21, 1863. The uprising was widely supported by local residents, and as punishment, in 1870 Russians stripped Różan of its town charter. Nevertheless, Różan was a strong garrison of the Imperial Russian Army, with four forts, built after 1886.

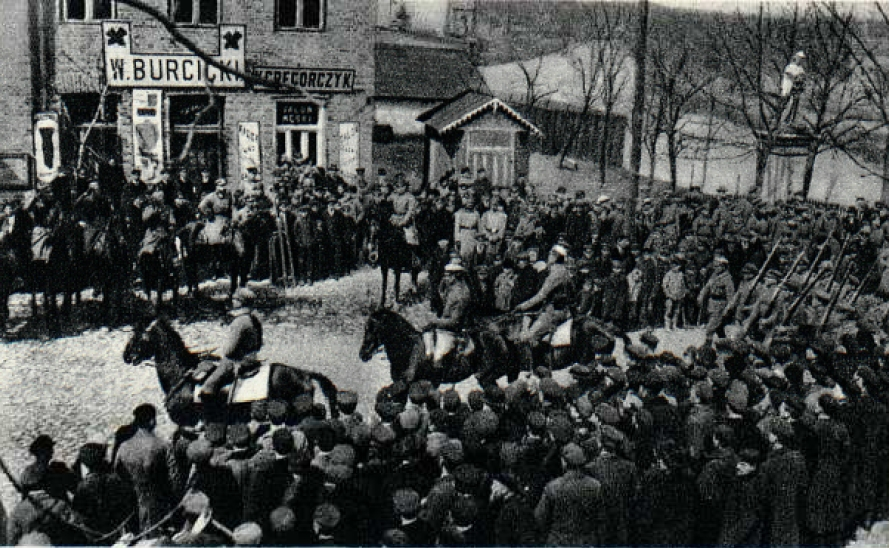
Polish Legions in Różan in 1916

The crossing of the Narew at Różan had significant military importance in the first half of the 20th century. The Russian Imperial Army fortified and garrisoned Różan around 1900. The Różan Fortress was built at that time. It was defended against German attacks in 1915 in the course of World War I.

After the war, in 1918, Poland regained independence and control of Różan. Town rights were restored in 1919.

During the Polish–Soviet War, the invading Russians captured 13 Polish soldiers in the town and murdered them in the village of Miecze on August 23, 1920. There is a mass grave of the massacred soldiers at the local Catholic cemetery.

Rożan was fortified further before 1939. By 1939, its population grew to 5,800.

=== World War II ===
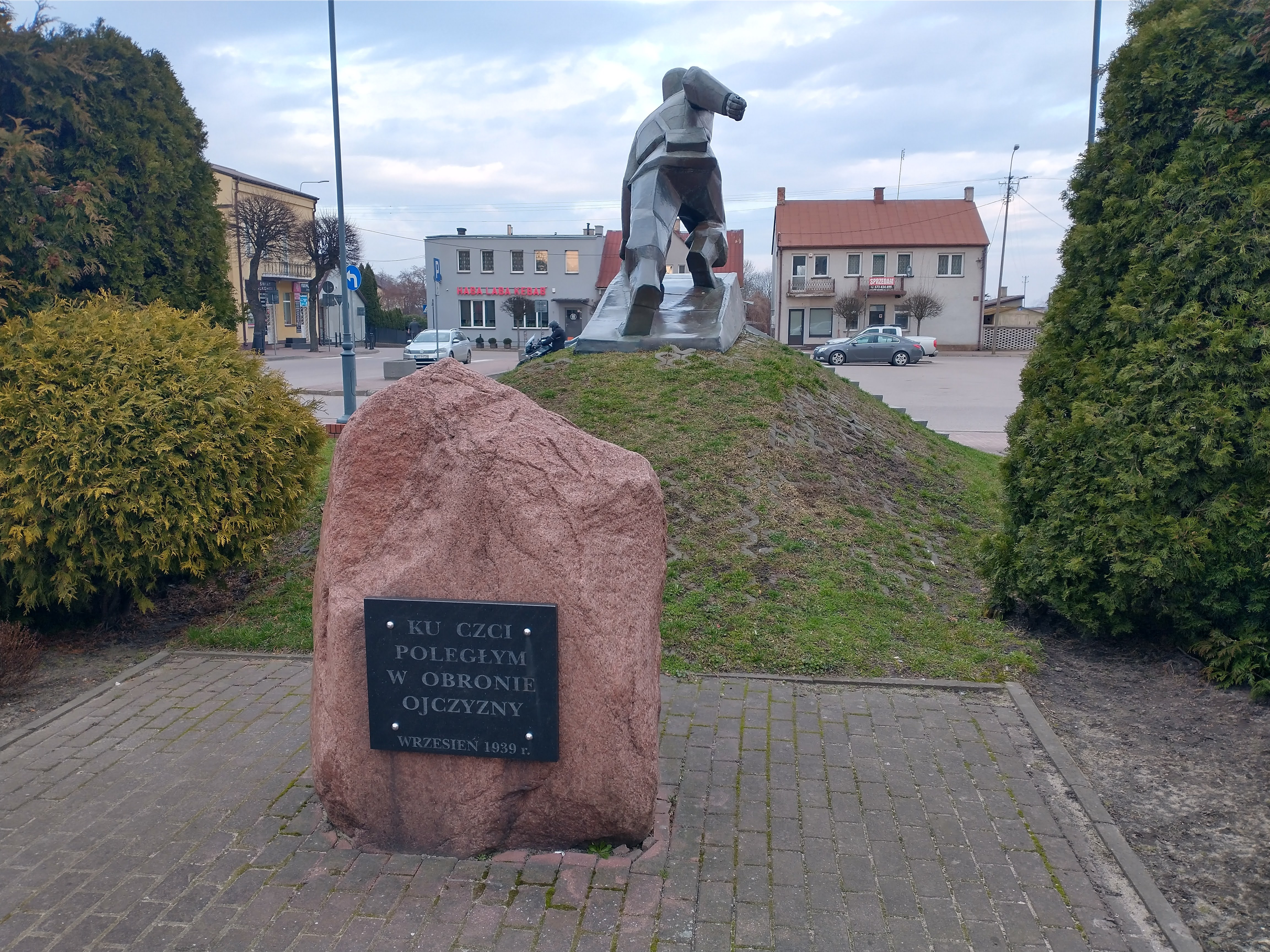
Memorial to Polish defenders from September 1939

During the German Invasion of Poland, which started World War II in September 1939, Różan was defended by the Polish army.

In the beginning of the German occupation, the occupiers carried out mass searches of homes of local policemen, postal workers and court employees. In November 1940, the German gendarmerie carried out expulsions of Poles, whose houses were handed over to German colonists as part of the Lebensraum policy.

At the outbreak of World War II, Różan was home to some 1,800 Jews. From March 1942 until September, a slave labor camp for Jews was operated within the Różan Fortress. In November 1942, the Jews were sent back to the nearby ghetto in Maków Mazowiecki, whereupon they were deported to Auschwitz. Over 1,400 Rozan Jews were murdered in the Holocaust.

In the course of the fighting in 1944, the Red Army seized a bridgehead across the Narew at Różan, which it used as one of the springboards for the January 1945 Vistula–Oder Offensive. The town was completely destroyed during the war, only 5% of buildings remained by 1945. The town was restored to Poland.
