= Zabłocki =

Łada coat of arms

Zabłocki (feminine: Zabłocka, plural: Zabłoccy) is the name of a Polish aristocratic family of ancient lineage (Jastrzębiec) and Coat of arms Łada, who assumed the name of Zabłocki after acquisition of Zabłocie Pułtuskie in Wielkopolska in the year 1500. The ending "-cki" represents the English "of"; Zabłocki = of Zabłocie; or German "von Zabłocie".

== Coat of arms ==
Łada: on red background, a silver horseshoe with opening to the South, on its top a golden cross; on each side a silver arrow and two hunting horns in the lower field. On the helmet there is a golden and crowned lion holding a sword. This coat of arms was first mentioned in 1248. It was named after the owner of the Łada estate who was a member of the Jastrzębiec family and the progenitor of the Zabłocki family.

== Cyprian Zabłocki ==
A Polish saying for a shrewd business plan to result in a major loss, “wyjść jak Zabłocki na mydle” arose from a semi-legendary misadventure of Cyprian Franciszek Zabłocki (1792–1868). His properties in Rybno included a manufacture of soap which he intended to export abroad via the port in Gdańsk. Transported by river, the barge had to pass Prussian border. In order to avoid high tariffs, Zabłocki decided to smuggle the soap by placing waterproofed crates underwater, dragged at a distance behind the barge. He successfully passed the customs, but alas, the waterproofing on not a single crate held, leading to a total loss of cargo.

== Other people ==
Notable people with the surname include:

- Benjamin Zablocki (1941–2020), American sociologist
- Bernard Zabłocki (1907–2002), Polish scientist
- Clement J. Zablocki (1912–1983), American politician from Wisconsin
- Courtney Zablocki (born 1981), American athlete
- Franciszek Zabłocki (1754–1821), Polish writer
- Jakub Zabłocki (1984–2015), Polish football player
- Jan Zabłocki (born 1944), Polish lawyer
- Jan Zabłocki (c. 1757 – ?), Polish officer
- Janusz Zabłocki (1926–2014), Polish politician
- Julia Zabłocka (1931–1993), Polish archaeologist
- Stryker Zablocki (born 2007), Canadian ice hockey player
- Wanda Zabłocka (1900–1978), Polish phytopathologist and mycologist
- Wojciech Zabłocki (1930–2020), Polish athlete and architect

== See also ==
- Zablocki v. Redhail (1978), a U.S. Supreme Court case
