= Jan Zabłocki =

Jan Zabłocki may refer to:

- Jan Zabłocki (lawyer)
- Jan Zabłocki (officer)
