= Mielnik =

- Village
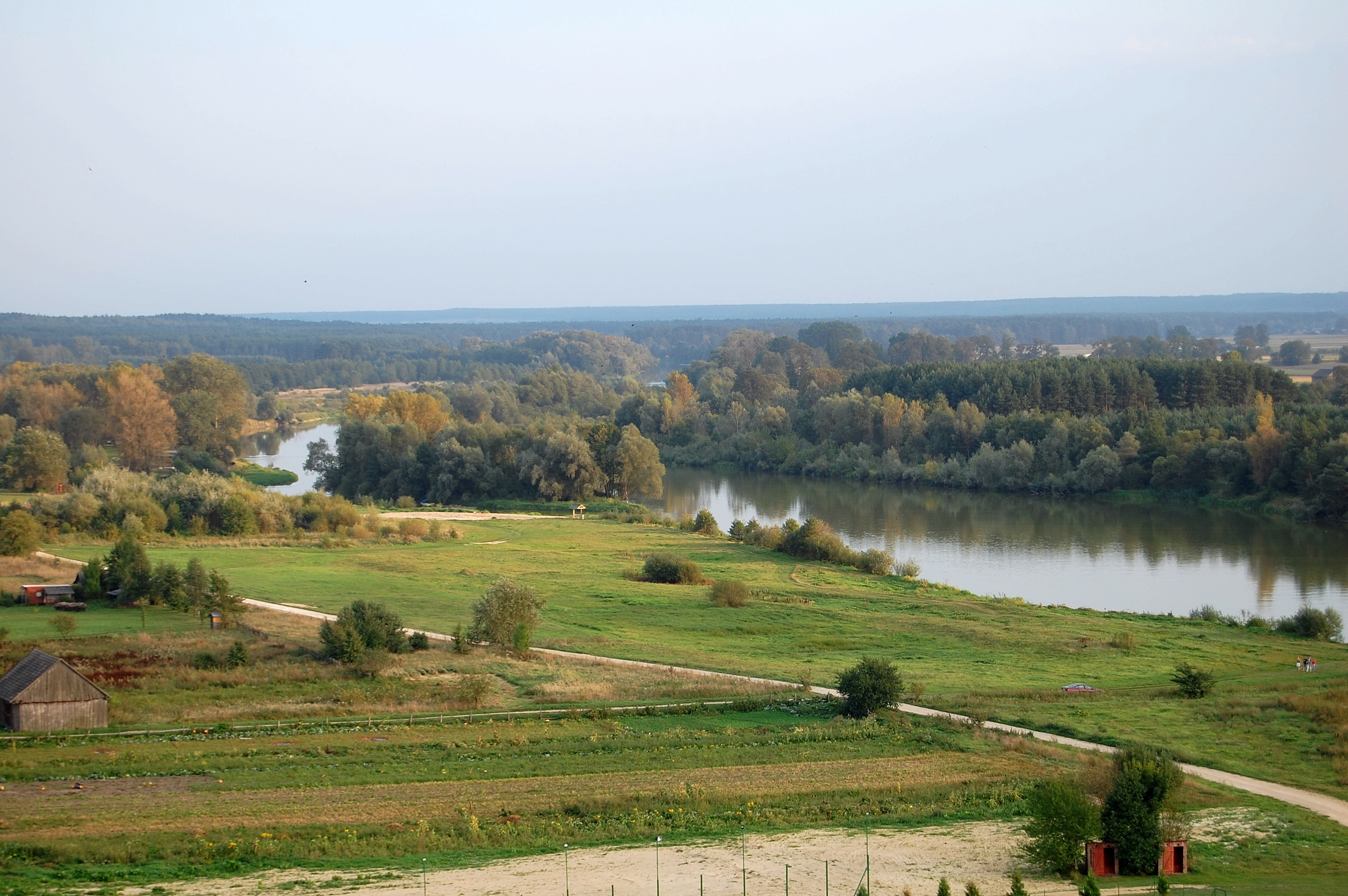
- Bug River in Mielnik

- Coat of arms

- Location within Poland
- Coordinates: 52°20′N 23°3′E
- Country: Poland
- Voivodeship: Podlaskie
- County: Siemiatycze
- Gmina: Mielnik

Population
  - Total: 980
- Time zone: UTC+1 (CET)
  - Summer (DST): UTC+2 (CEST)
- Vehicle registration: BSI

Mielnik [ˈmʲɛlɲik] is a village in Siemiatycze County, Podlaskie Voivodeship, in eastern Poland, close to the border with Belarus. It is the seat of the gmina (administrative district) called Gmina Mielnik.

There is an open pit chalk mine in Mielnik.

== History ==
Mielnik has a long and rich history. The area of the town was in c. 1018 captured by warriors of Bolesław I the Brave, and remained in Polish hands until c. 1050, when Casimir I the Restorer handed it to Grand Prince of Kiev, Yaroslav the Wise, for his help in getting rid of Miecław. Since Mielnik was located near the settlement of the Yotvingians, its area was subject to frequent raids.

In 1323–1324, Mielnik and nearby Drohiczyn were captured by Lithuanian Duke Gediminas, and remained part of the Grand Duchy of Lithuania until 1569, part of the Polish–Lithuanian union since 1385, except for the period of 1391–1408, when it was governed by Mazovian Duke Janusz I of Warsaw of the Piast dynasty, and 1430–1444, when it was ruled by Duke Bolesław IV of Warsaw. In 1420, Duke Vytautas founded here a Roman Catholic church, which was located in the complex of the Mielnik Castle. On September 22, 1440, Mielnik received Chełmno town charter from Duke Bolesław IV. Four years later, the town was purchased by King Casimir IV Jagiellon.

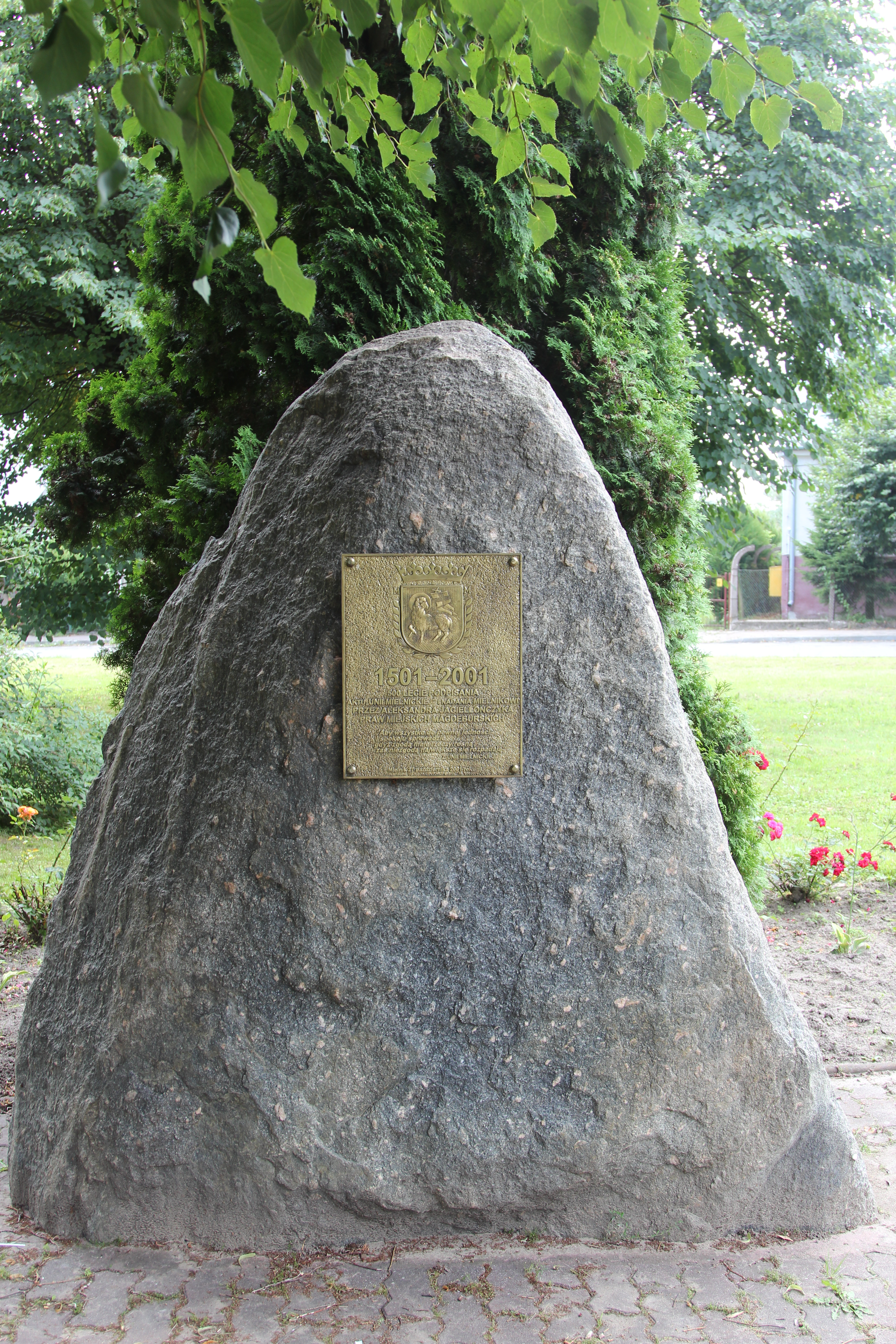
Union of Mielnik memorial

On 1 October 1501, Alexander I Jagiellon named first vogt of Mielnik, a nobleman named Mikołaj Rychlik, who resided in a manor house at Osłowo. On October 23 of the same year, the Union of Mielnik was signed by Alexander I and Lithuanian nobles. Four days later, Alexander changed Mielnik's town charter into Magdeburg rights. King Sigismund I the Old visited Mielnik twice, in 1506 (while awaiting Polish crown), and 1513, when he stayed here for a month, ordering construction of a second Catholic church.

In the 16th century, Mielnik established its position as one of the most important towns of the province of Podlasie. In 1520 it became seat of a powiat, and in 1545, three Russian boyars, Fiedor Owczyna, Jendriej Palecki and Michalko Obolenski were imprisoned in the Mielnik Castle. The castle itself was expanded and remodeled in the 1540s and early 1550s by starosta Nikodem Janowicz Swiejko of Ciechanowiec. Since 1551, it was a Renaissance complex, used for royal visits. In 1554, a bridge over the Bug river was destroyed, and a new one was built in Turna. As a result, merchants with their goods bypassed Mielnik, which contributed to the town's slow decline. In 1566, the Mielnik Land, a territorial unit within the Podlaskie Voivodeship, was established.

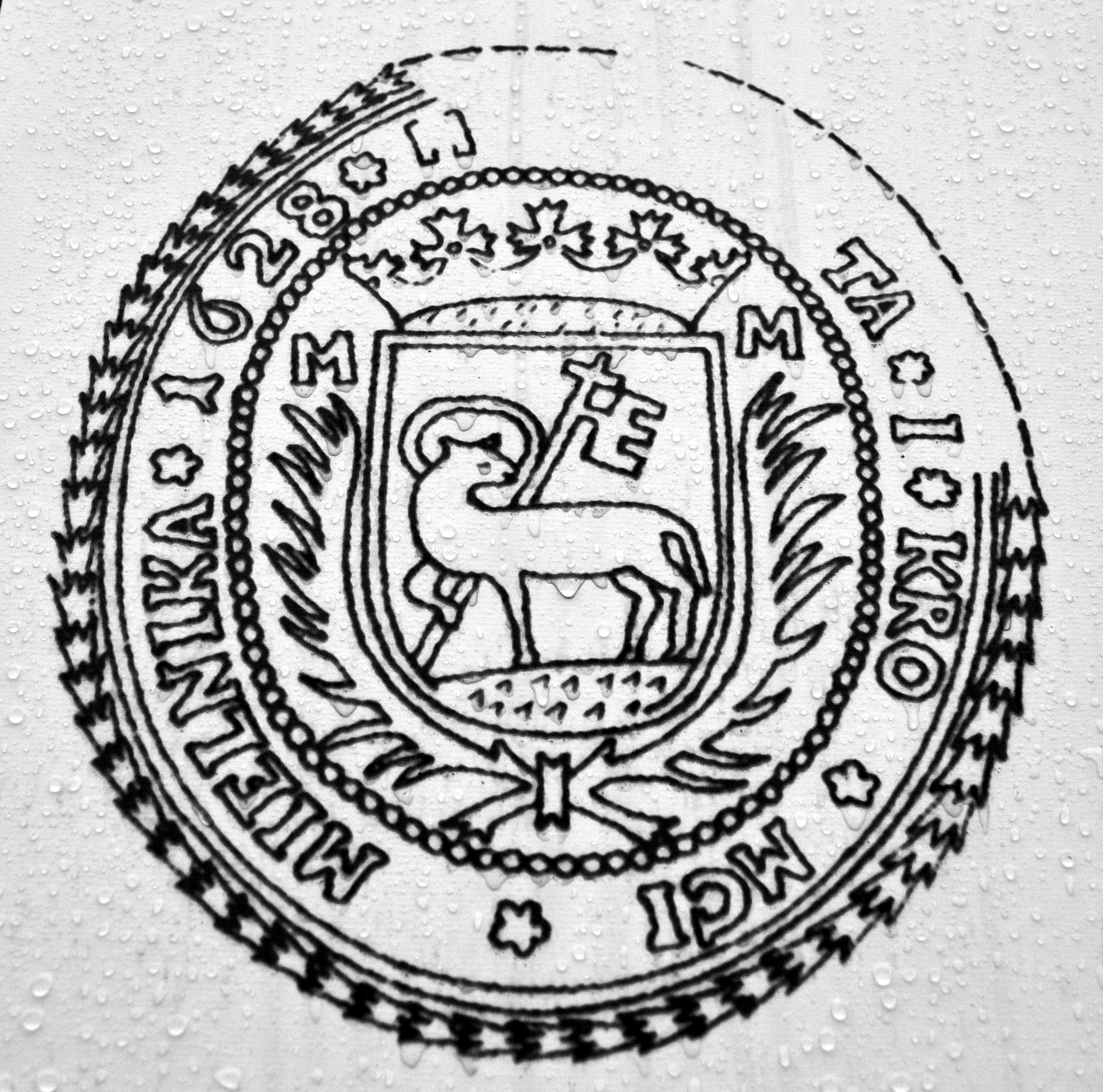
17th-century seal of the royal town of Mielnik

Following the act of restoration of the Podlasie region to the Kingdom of Poland and Union of Lublin (1569), Mielnik passed to the Kingdom of Poland. Its population was c. 1,500, and the town remained an important urban center of Podlasie.

Swedish invasion of Poland was a disaster for Mielnik, and the town has never recovered from the destruction. In late May 1657, it was burned to the ground by Swedes of Gustav Otto Steinbock and Transilvanians of George II Rakoczi, who also destroyed the royal castle and the parish church. As a result, Mielnik lost 70% of population.

Following the Partitions of Poland, Mielnik was annexed by the Kingdom of Prussia (1795), and in 1807, it was transferred to the Russian Empire, where it remained until World War I. In 1829, Russians destroyed the local Catholic church, and in 1863, to commemorate the suppression of the January Uprising, the Orthodox chapel of Alexander Nevsky was built. Mielnik returned to Poland in 1919, losing its town charter in 1934.

Following the joint German-Soviet invasion of Poland, which started World War II in September 1939, Mielnik was first occupied by the Soviet Union until 1941, and then by Germany until 1944. Afterwards, it was restored to Poland, although with a Soviet-installed communist regime, which stayed in power until the Fall of Communism in the 1980s. The Polish anti-communist resistance was active in Mielnik, and in 1945–1947, it carried out two raids on the local communist police station.

== Culture ==
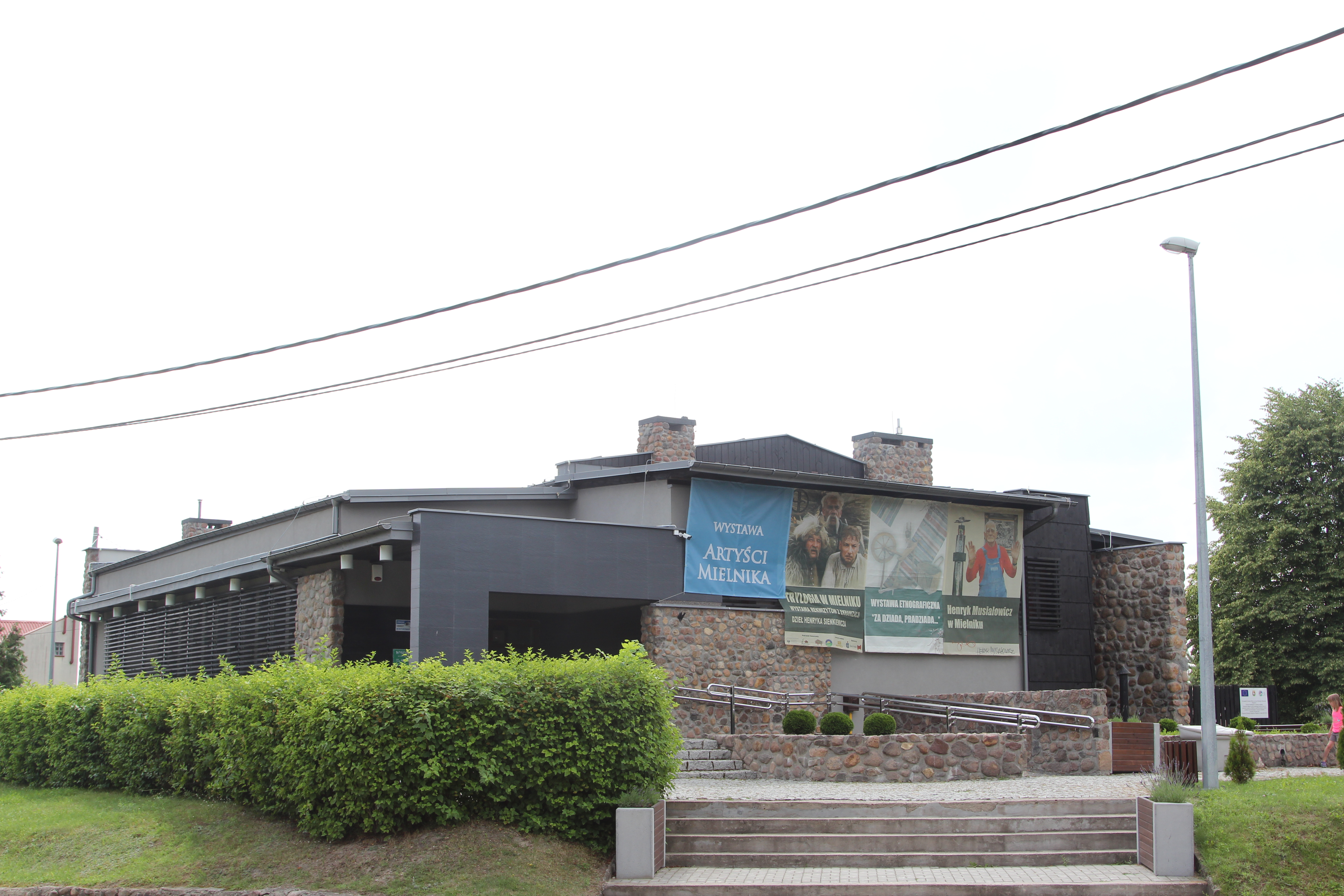
Museum in Mielnik

There is a local museum in Mielnik.

== Demographics ==
=== 1897 census ===
The most spoken languages in Mielnik according to the Russian Imperial Census of 1897:

Language	Population	Proportion
Jewish	441	29.7%
Ukrainian	422	28.42%
Russian	324	21.81%
Polish	293	19.73%
Unknown	5	.34 %
Total	1,485	100.00%

== People associated with Mielnik ==
- Jerzy Nikitorowicz, rector of the University of Białystok was born here

== See also ==
- Church of the Nativity of the Blessed Virgin Mary, Mielnik
