= Wojciech Śleszyński =

Polish historian

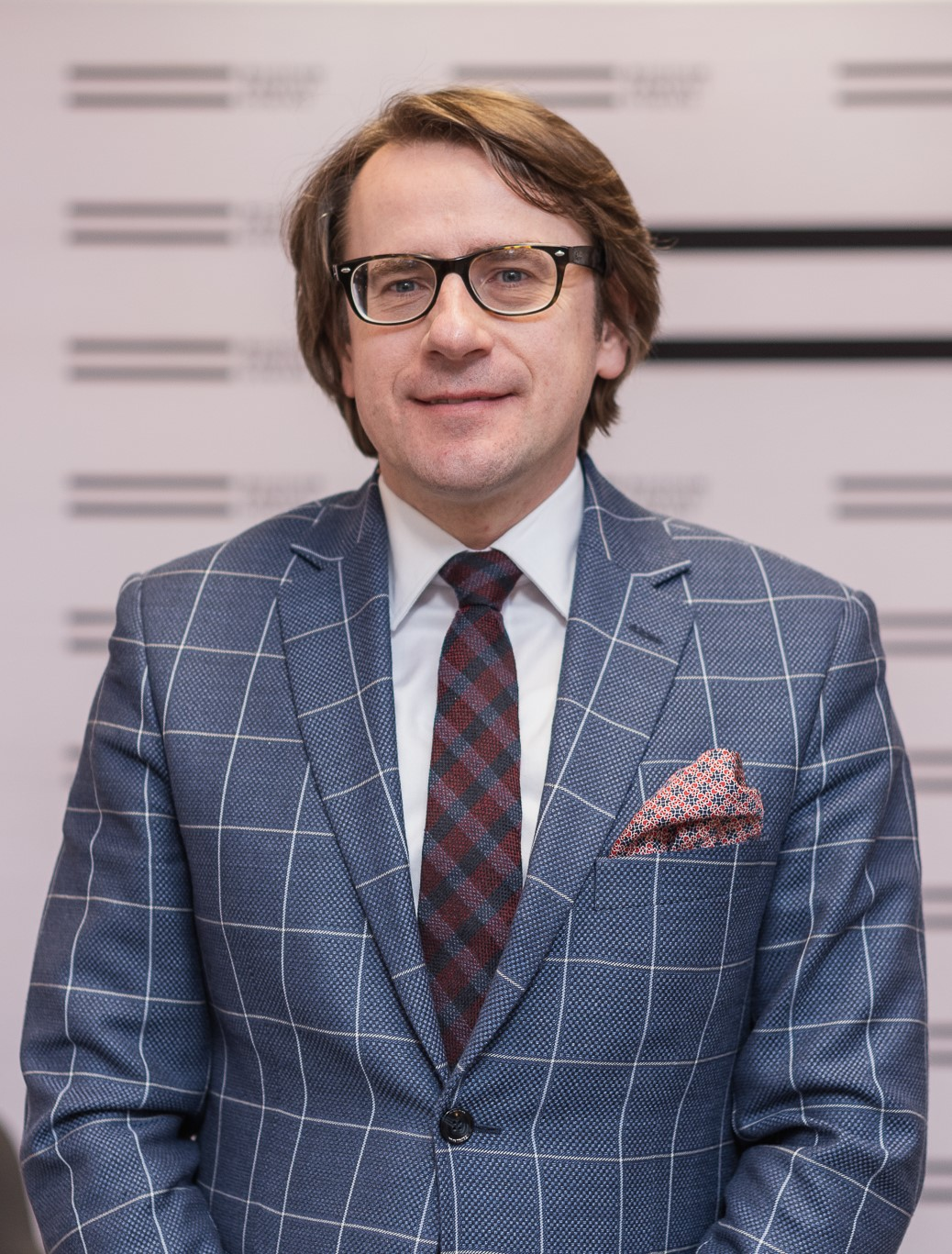

Wojciech Śleszyński (born 1970) is a Polish historian and dean of the History and Sociology Faculty at the University of Białystok.

== Biography ==
In 1996, Śleszyński graduated from the History Department at the Białystok campus of the University of Warsaw. In 2001 he received his PhD at the Faculty of History and Sociology of the University of Białystok, based on the dissertation "Propaganda i indoktrynacja władz sowieckich na Białostocczyźnie w latach 1939–1941" (Propaganda and indoctrination of the Soviet authorities in the Bialystok region in 1939–1941). In 2008 he received his habilitation at the Institute of Political Studies of the Polish Academy of Sciences, with the dissertation "Bezpieczeństwo wewnętrzne w polityce państwa polskiego na ziemiach północno-wschodnich II Rzeczypospolitej" (Internal security in the policy of the Polish state in the north-eastern territories of the Second Republic of Poland). He became a professor in 2019.

Śleszyński was the deputy director of the Institute of History of the University of Białystok (2005–2008) and the director of the Institute of History and Political Science of the University of Białystok (2008–2012). In 2008, he was appointed head of the Department of Political Relations at the University of Białystok. In the years 2012–2016, he was the dean of the Faculty of History and Sociology at the University of Białystok, and in the years 2016–2020, he was the vice-rector for education at the University of Białystok. Since 2019, he has been the head of the Department of Eastern Studies at the University of Bialystok.

Since January 2017, he has been the director of the Sybir Memorial Museum in Białystok.

He received the Silver (2016) and Bronze (2009) Cross of Merit.

== Publications ==
- Syberyjski Białystok, Białystok: Muzeum Pamięci Sybiru, 2020.
- Życie na Kresach: województwa wschodnie II Rzeczypospolitej (1919-1939), Białystok: Muzeum Pamięci Sybiru, 2020.
