= Anna Tarwacka =

Polish lawyer

Anna Ewa Tarwacka
- Born: 23 May 1978 (age 48)
- Occupation: Professor of law
- Title: Professor of Social Sciences

Academic background
- Education: Cardinal Stefan Wyszyński University, University of Warsaw, University of Białystok
- Thesis: Roman Law and Piracy (2008)
- Doctoral advisor: Jan Zabłocki

Academic work
- Discipline: Legal Sciences
- Sub-discipline: Roman Law
- Institutions: Cardinal Stefan Wyszyński University
- Main interests: Roman law

Anna Ewa Tarwacka (Note: Polish: [ˈanna ˈɛva tarˈvat͡ska]) (born 23 May 1978) is a Polish lawyer and a professor of social sciences in the field of legal sciences. She holds a professorship at Cardinal Stefan Wyszyński University in Warsaw and specializes in Roman law.

== Academic career ==
In 2001, she graduated with a degree in classical philology from the University of Warsaw, and in 2003, she completed her legal studies at the Faculty of Law and Administration of the University of Warsaw. In 2008, based on her dissertation titled "Roman Law and Piracy," written under the supervision of Jan Zabłocki, she obtained the degree of Doctor of Legal Sciences in the field of law, specializing in Roman law, from the Faculty of Law and Administration of Cardinal Stefan Wyszyński University. In 2013, at the Faculty of Law of the University of Białystok, she achieved the degree of Habilitated Doctor of Legal Sciences in the field of law, specializing in Roman law, based on her scientific achievements and the dissertation titled "Legal Aspects of the Censor's Office in Ancient Rome." She became an associate professor at the Faculty of Law and Administration of Cardinal Stefan Wyszyński University in Warsaw, employed in the Department of Roman Law, and served as the deputy dean of this faculty for the term 2016–2020.

In 2020, the president of the Republic of Poland, Andrzej Duda, awarded her the title of professor of social sciences in the discipline of legal sciences.

== Academic memberships ==
In 2021, she became a corresponding member of the Warsaw Scientific Society. From 2021 to 2023, she was a member of the Scientific Council of the Institute De Republica.
