= Franciszek Zabłocki =

Polish dramatist and satirist

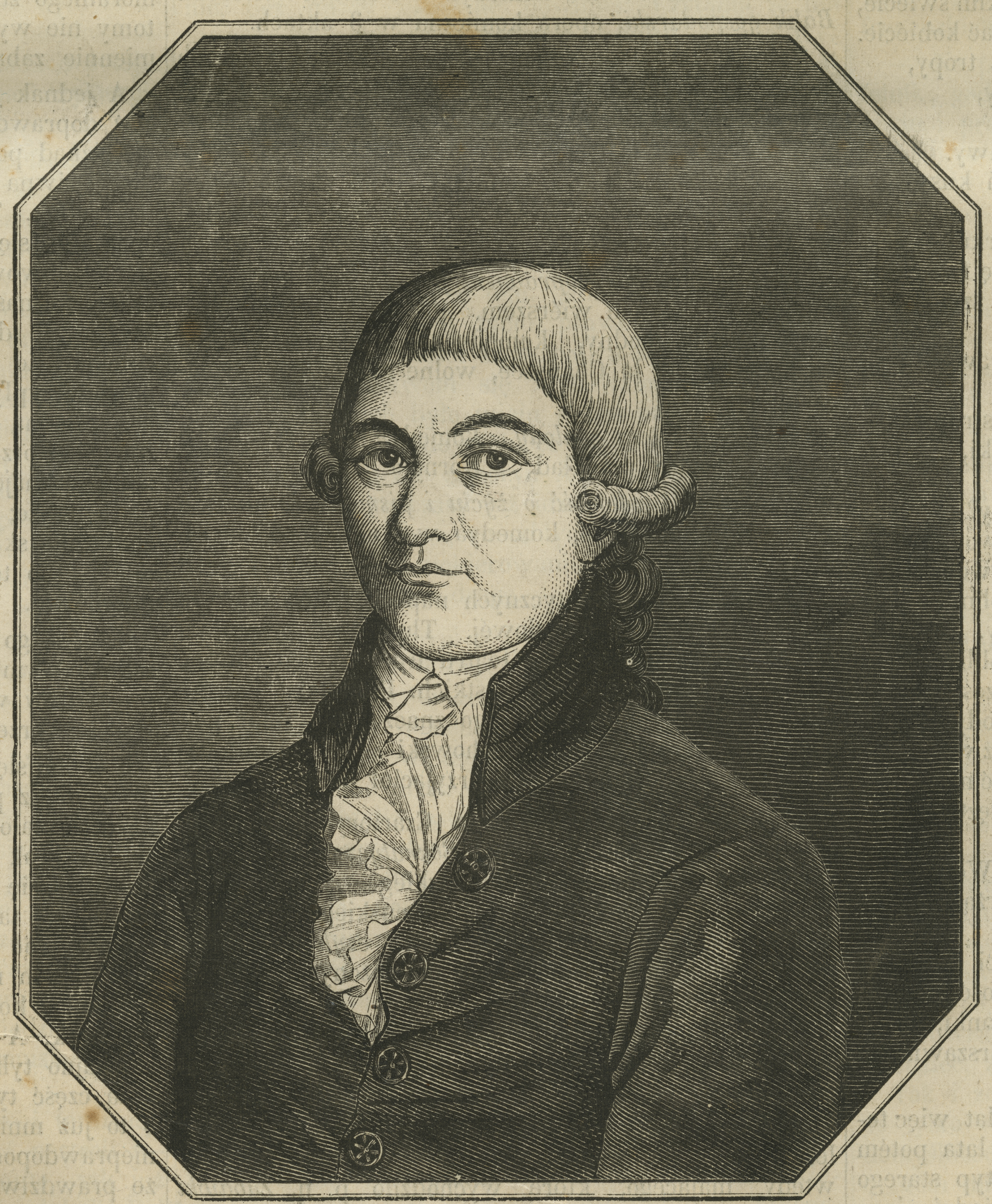
Franciszek Zabłocki

Franciszek Ksawery Mikołaj Zabłocki (2 January 1754, Volhynia – 10 September 1821, Końskowola), was considered the most distinguished Polish comic dramatist and satirist of the Enlightenment period. He descended from an old aristocratic family of Poland with coat of arms Łada. He translated many French comedies, among others those by Molière, but also wrote his own plays concentrating on Polish issues.

From 1774, he worked in the Commission for National Education and in 1794, he took part in the Kościuszko Uprising. During the next year he gave up literature and became a priest.

== Literary career ==
Zabłocki's literary career began with the publication of his work in the Polish literary magazine Zabawy Przyjemne i Pożyteczne ("Pleasant and Useful Amusements"). The magazine was the first of its kind in Poland, and was launched in the year 1770.

During King Stanislaw August's reign, Warsaw was the scene of great literary activity. The King used to host literary figures for dinner every Thursday. Zablocki was a regular invitee to these parties, which included in its guest list such Polish luminaries as Adam Naruszewicz and Ignacy Krasicki. During one such meeting, Zabłocki was asked to read his first comedy Fri Zabobonnik. The King was so enraptured by this song that he bestowed the Medal Merentibus on Zabłocki.

After that Zablocki turned to writing plays, producing an astounding 40 plays in ten years. He mostly wrote comedies. His major works are Amphitryon (1783), Sarmatism (1785), Muhammad Harlequin (1785), King of Bliss in the Country (1787), Yellow Nightcap (1783), Doctor of Lublin (1781), Gamrat (1785), and The Marriage of Figaro (1786).

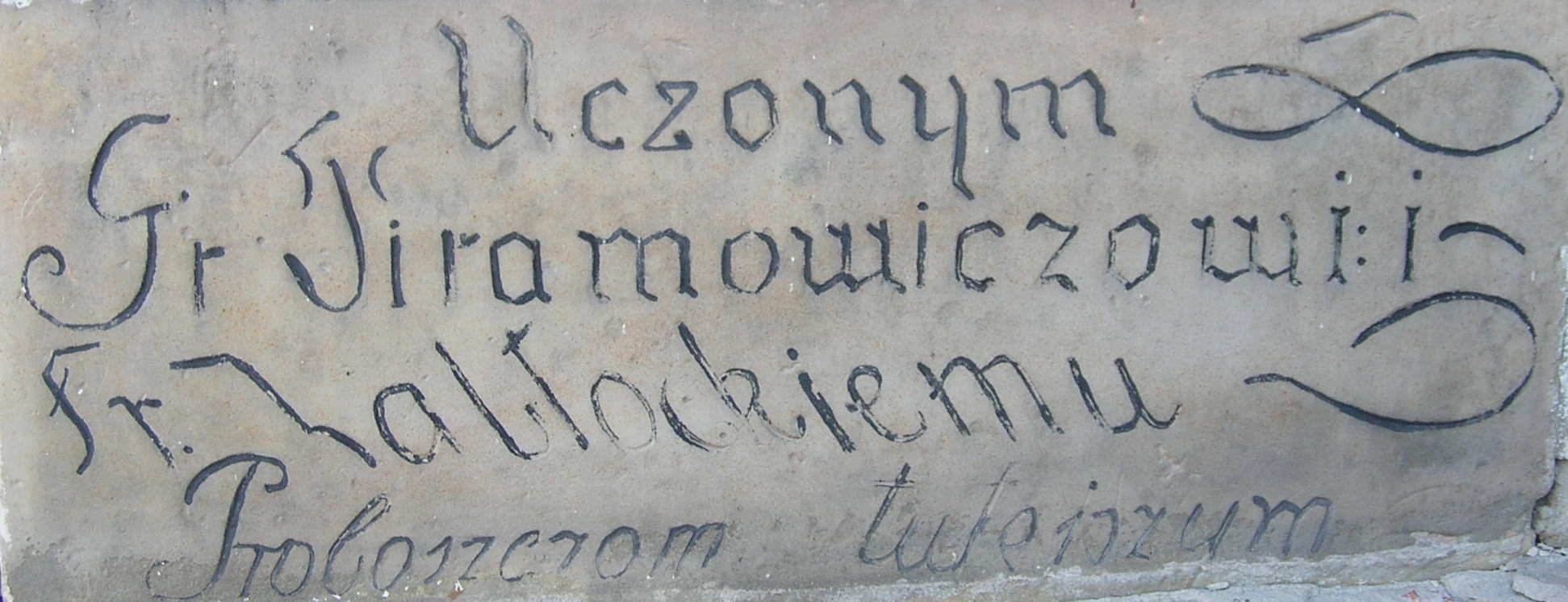
A memorial tablet in honor of Zabłocki.

== See also ==
- Zablocki family
