= Church of the Nativity of the Blessed Virgin Mary, Mielnik =

Orthodox church in Mielnik, Poland

Church of the Nativity of the Blessed Virgin Mary
- Cerkiew Narodzenia Najświętszej Maryi Panny
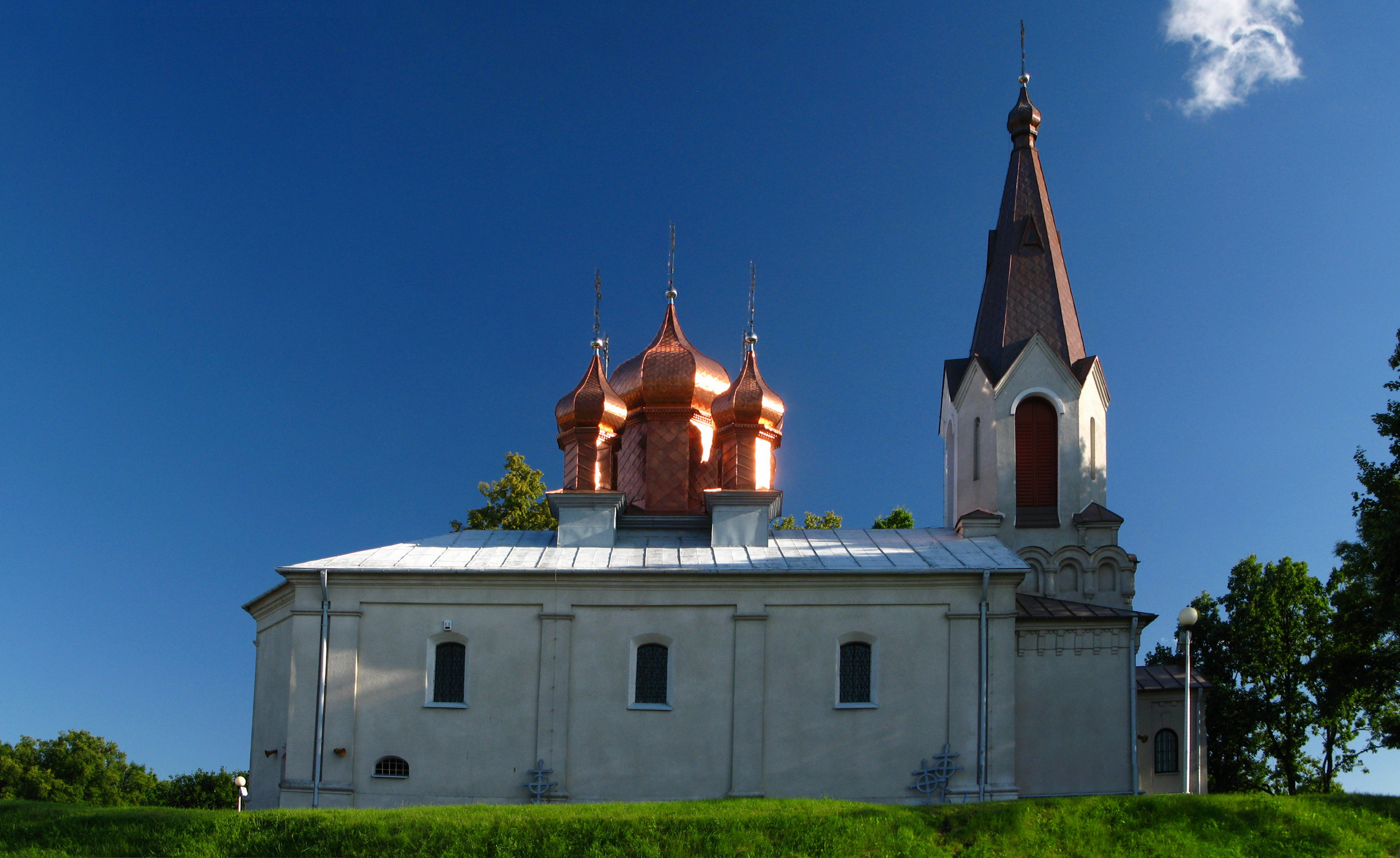
- General view
- Church of the Nativity of the Blessed Virgin Mary
- 52°19′57.2″N 23°02′27.0″E
- Location: Mielnik
- Country: Poland
- Denomination: Eastern Orthodoxy
- Previous denomination: Greek Catholic (until 1839)
- Churchmanship: Polish Orthodox Church

History
- Status: active Orthodox church
- Dedication: Nativity of Mary

Architecture
- Style: Neoclassical with elements of Russian Revival (after the renovations at the beginning of the 20th century)
- Years built: 1821–1823; the beginning of the 20th century; 1943

Specifications
- Materials: brick stone

Administration
- Diocese: Diocese of Warsaw and Bielsk

The Church of the Nativity of the Blessed Virgin Mary is an Orthodox parish church located in Mielnik. It belongs to the Dekanat Siemiatycze (diecezja warszawsko-bielska) of the Diecezja warszawsko-bielska of the Polish Orthodox Church.The first written records of the existence of an Orthodox church in Mielnik date back to 1260 and then to 1551. In the 17th century, the Mielnik parish adopted the Union of Brest, becoming a Uniate (Greek Catholic) church. The church was destroyed by fire in 1614 and again in 1656, each time being rebuilt afterward. The first brick church in the village was constructed between 1821 and 1823 in the Neoclassical style. Like all Uniate churches in Podlachia, it had strongly Latinized features, including an organ, pulpit, and side altars, but it uniquely retained an iconostasis. Most Latin elements were removed from the church between 1835 and 1838 during the de-Latinization campaign that prepared the entire Lithuanian Uniate diocese for conversion to Orthodoxy. The manner and extent of changes in the church's interior led to a dispute between the clergy and the county head, Miedwiediew, who insisted on immediately remodeling Uniate churches in the typical Russian architectural style. The consistory of the Lithuanian diocese, led by Bishop Joseph Semashko, advocated for gradual changes and agreed to allow some secondary Latin elements to remain in the Mielnik church and other churches.

The church in Mielnik was transferred to the Russian Orthodox Church by the decree of the Synod of Polotsk in 1839. At the beginning of the 20th century, the building underwent a thorough reconstruction in the Russian Revival style. A church porch with a bell tower and five onion-shaped domes were added. During this period, the iconostasis was also replaced.The church in Mielnik is a center of local veneration of the icon of the Mother of God Oranta, dating from the late 18th to early 19th century. Other antique Uniate images from the same period are preserved in the parish house in the village.

== History ==
=== First Orthodox churches in Mielnik ===
The earliest mention of an Orthodox church in Mielnik dates back to 1260. It notes the existence of a church with a particularly venerated icon of the Mother of God, before which Vasylko, brother of Daniel of Galicia, prayed as he embarked on a campaign against the Yotvingians. This was most likely a castle church, and the exact time of the establishment of the Orthodox parish in Mielnik is impossible to determine due to a lack of documents. Legendary accounts date the founding of the church in Mielnik as far back as the 11th century.

The next mention of churches comes only in 1551, indicating the existence of two churches in Mielnik, one of which was located on the site of the contemporary one.The church is located at 93 Brzeska Street, on a natural elevation. This was a wooden church, which survived until 1614 when it was completely destroyed by fire. The sacred building was rebuilt and remained in Orthodox hands (in the Eparchia włodzimiersko-brzeska) even after the Union of Brest, to which the local faithful were opposed. The Uniates took over the Mielnik church no later than 1646. Ten years later, the building burned down again, after which it was rebuilt.

A visitation protocol of the Nativity of the Blessed Virgin Mary parish from between 1726 and 1727 indicates that the church housed a four-row iconostasis. The earliest pipe organs and a pulpit appeared in the church in the third decade of the 18th century.

The Uniate parishes in Mielnik (Note: Until 1836, a second parish church dedicated to the Resurrection of Christ operated in Mielnik. In that year, this church was closed due to several factors: the small number of parishioners (who were then merged with the other Mielnik parish), the poor technical condition of the church, and general poverty (Matus (2013, p. 91)).) were under the jurisdiction of the Eparchy of Volodymyr and Brest and belonged to the Drohiczyn Deanery. In 1797, along with the entire deanery, they were incorporated into the Diecezja supraska. After its abolition in 1807, they were re-incorporated into the Eparchy of Volodymyr and Brest, and in 1828, as part of the reorganization of the territorial division of the Uniate Church in the Russian Empire, into the Lithuanian diocese.

=== 19th century church ===
==== Uniate church ====
Between 1821 and 1823, a new Neoclassical stone church was built on the site of the former wooden one. It was constructed from field stones and bricks, funded by parish savings and donations from local believers. The church was dedicated to the Nativity of the Mother of God, although documents from subsequent years also reference the dedication to the Resurrection of the Lord.

The interior of the Uniate church in Mielnik was significantly Latinized. At the same time, it was one of five Uniate sacred buildings in the region where the iconostasis was not dismantled after the Synod of Zamość or in the following decades. By early 1836, however, the church lacked typical Byzantine liturgical books, an altar table, and liturgical vessels. These items were introduced as part of a de-latinization campaign of the Uniate rite in Podlachia, preparing for the conversion of Uniate Lithuanian diocese to Orthodoxy. Later that year, the dean of Drohiczyn informed the diocesan consistory that the church had been equipped with all necessary liturgical items for Orthodox services. In 1838, the Uniate iconostasis was replaced with a new one, funded by the Russian state. In May of that year, the dean of Bielsk, Kostycewicz, and the civil authority representative, Miedwiediew, inspected the church, noting the presence of several typically Uniate items and the lack of many Orthodox ones. Contrary to earlier declarations by the local clergy, the pipe organs (dismantled throughout the diocese between 1835 and 1836) remained in the temple, although it was no longer in use. Miedwiediew, particularly critical of the church's appearance, demanded the immediate removal of various items including a bell, confessionals, balusters, tallow lamps, and the kliros. He also wanted the side altars with images of St. Nicholas and the Intercession of the Theotokos moved to the center of the church. This led to a conflict with the local priest, Florian Zienkiewicz, who argued for retaining these elements, citing the Lithuanian bishop Joseph Semashko's precedent of not insisting on the removal of such items during church inspections. The dean supported Zienkiewicz and asked the consistory for a clear ruling on which Latin elements were permissible in the church.

On 12 March 1838, the dean met with Miedwiediew to persuade him to allow a gradual, rather than immediate, adaptation of Uniate churches to Orthodox liturgical standards. Miedwiediew accused the dean of tolerating Latin influences in all parishes within the deanery. In April 1838, the consistory sought the intervention of the Białystok district chief, Gunaropulla, to halt Miedwiediew's interference. Auxiliary bishop of the Lithuanian diocese, Antoni Zubko, also sent a letter to the district chief, who eventually complied. Miedwiediew accused the Mielnik clergy of ignoring ecclesiastical directives on delatinization and argued that all Uniate churches in Podlachia should be immediately redesigned to reflect typical Russian sacral architecture.

The Lithuanian consistory discussed the situation in Mielnik in a separate session, establishing precise guidelines on retaining foreign elements in churches under exceptional circumstances. By June 1838, the Mielnik parson reported that without further funding, he could not purchase the necessary liturgical items. In August of that year, he received an additional state subsidy of 448 rubles and 92 kopecks, with the condition that part of this amount be reimbursed by landowners whose peasants attended the church. The full amount was eventually disbursed to the Mielnik clergy in October of the following year.

Mielnik's church was the last in Podlachia to complete the delatinization of the rite. After this process, the parson initially refused to declare readiness to convert to Orthodoxy. In July 1838, he was among 21 clergy who requested permission from the ober-procurator of the Most Holy Synod to remain Uniate, both for themselves and their congregations. Ultimately, he signed the declaration in the second half of 1838.

By 1838, the church served 1,300 parishioners.

==== Orthodox church ====
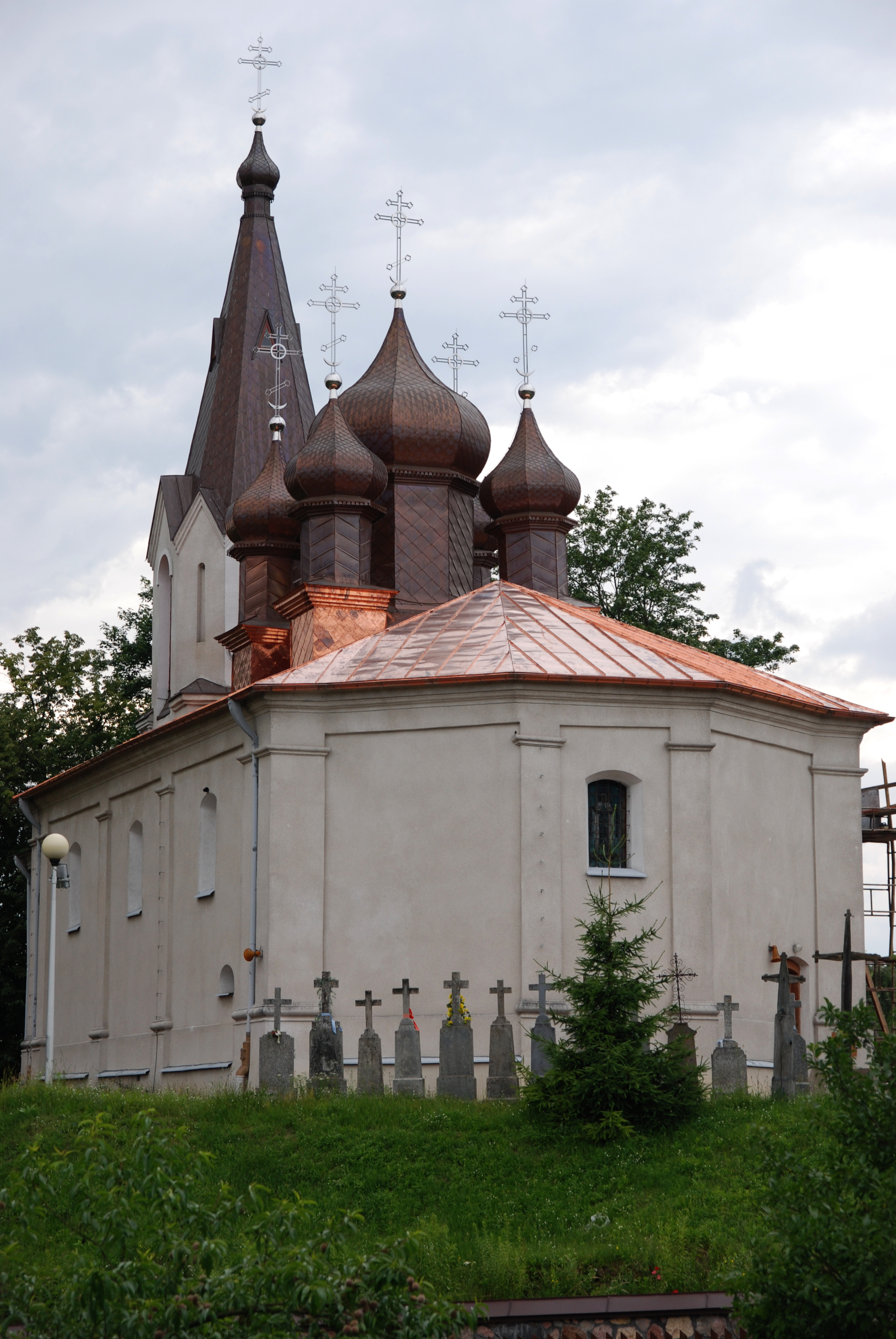
Church from the chancel side

In 1839, following the resolutions of the Synod of Polotsk, the Mielnik parish was transferred to the Russian Orthodox Church.

Between 1907 and 1910, the building underwent extensive reconstruction in the official Russian Revival style. A church porch with a belfry above it and five domes (known as piatigławie) were added.

In 1985, the church was renovated. During the works, the building was plastered, which completely altered its original appearance (stone façade with framed plaster divisions and lesenes).

In September 2015, the church received relics of Orthodox saints – the Vilnius martyrs Anthony, John, and Eustathius, donated by the Monastery of the Holy Spirit in Vilnius.

The church was listed as a historical monument on 17 April 1985 under number 598.

== Architecture ==
=== Structure of the Building ===
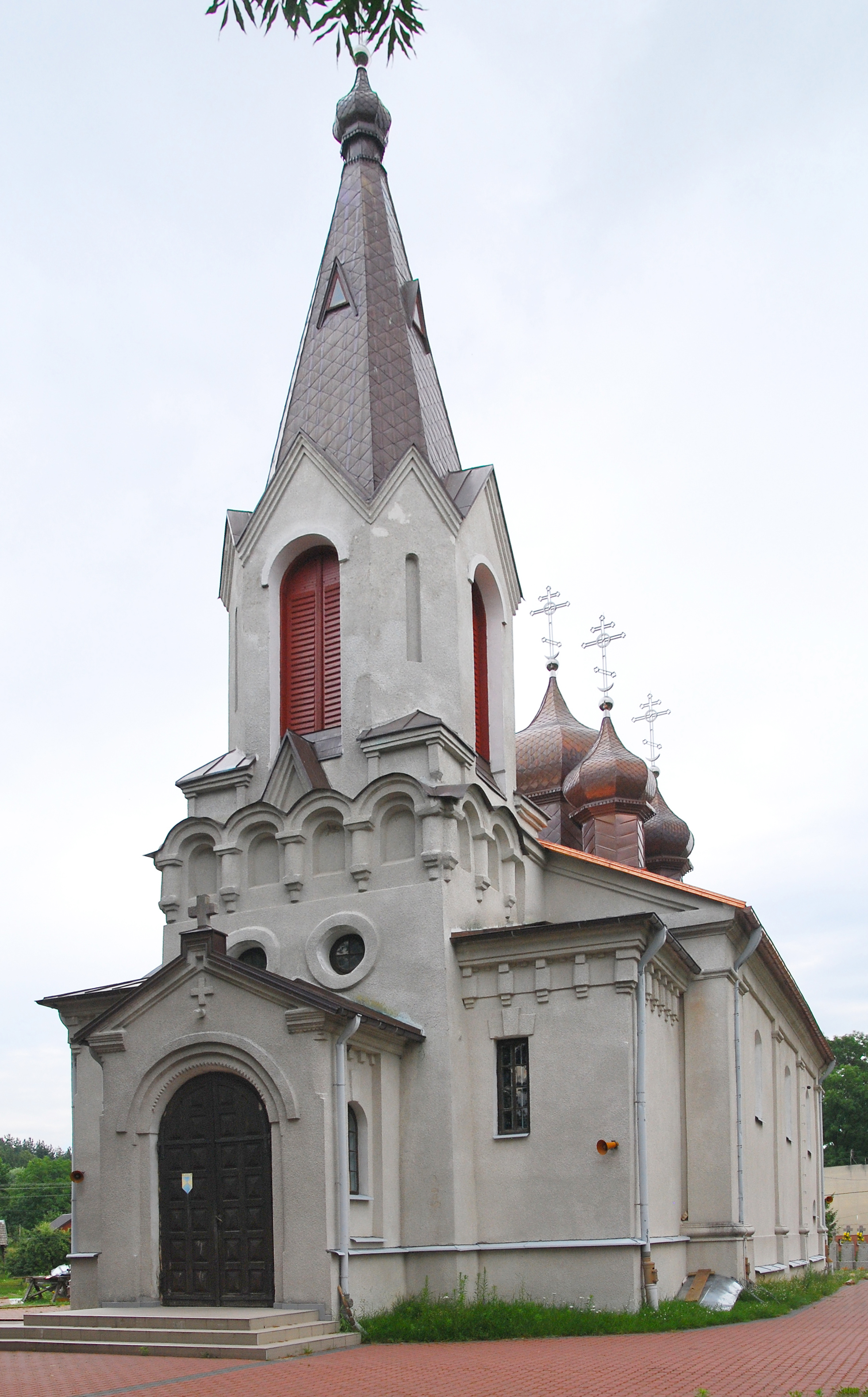
Church from the front

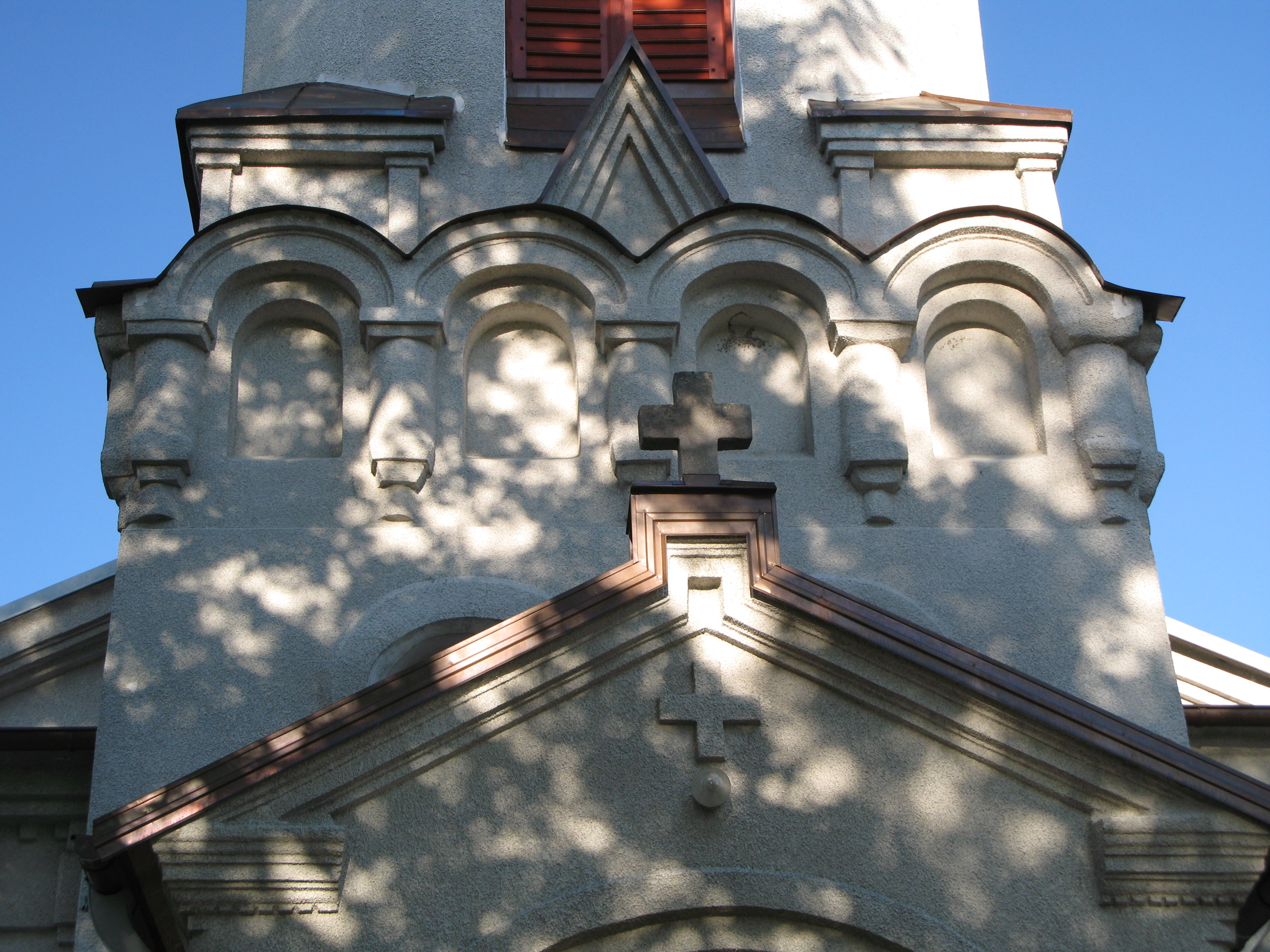
Decorative details of the church's facade

The church in Mielnik is built on a rectangular plan. It is a masonry structure with a three-bay body, oriented eastward. The church's church porch is lower and narrower than the naves, with a bell tower above it. The church porch is separated from the nave by a three-arched arcade, above which is a wooden matroneum for the choir, extending beyond the nave. The church windows are splayed and have segmental arches. In the church porch, they are rectangular, except for two circular windows on the western facade of the tower. The facades of the building's body are divided by pilasters, with the altar bay featuring doubled pilasters. The pilasters are topped with an entablature, and in the church porch, a block frieze is also present. The main facade of the church is three-axis, symmetrical, with a centrally placed bell tower on a square plan, transitioning to an octagonal shape in the upper sections. The bell tower is decorated with small triangular gables and a suspended arcaded frieze. On the western facade's axis, there is also a church porch with a stepped semicircular portal. The tower is topped with an octagonal spire. The church roofs are covered with metal sheets. Over the church porch and the main body, there are gable roofs, while other parts of the building have flat roofs. The chancel of the Mielnik church is not separated from the building's structure and is closed with a three-sided apse. In 2017, the exterior was renovated, changing its color to blue.

=== Interior ===
The church's interior is divided into naves by rows of wooden Tuscan columns. The aisles have flat ceilings, while the main nave features a false barrel vault. The iconostasis in the church dates back to the early 20th century and represents an Eclectic style with a predominance of Renaissance Revival elements. Similarly styled are four decorative icon cases from the same period. The church also houses two older icons: an 18th-century image of Mary in the Hodegetria type, extensively repainted in the early 20th century. This icon is in the Baroque style with Rococo ornaments on Mary's mantle.

Other historical elements of the church's furnishings from the period when the local parish belonged to the Uniate Church include an 18th-century Baroque pyx topped with a cross with a crucifix, a holy water kettle from between 1820 and 1830, and two silver-plated eternal lamps from around 1830.

From the furnishings of older churches in Mielnik, 18th-century icons of the Apostles, originally part of an iconostasis row, have been preserved. They are kept in the local parish rectory. All the paintings were executed on wooden panels using oil technique, in a Baroque manner, characterized by dramatic poses, swirling drapery, massive proportions of the saints, painterly approach, and chiaroscuro modeling. The background for the Apostles consists of golden acanthus leaves. The individual saints are not identifiable, except for St. Peter, who holds his characteristic attribute – the keys.

The church interior has been entirely covered with frescoes and polychrome (completed in 2015).

=== Icon of the Mother of God from Mielnik ===
Since the 18th century, the Mielnik parish has venerated an icon of the Mother of God, representing the rare Oranta type in Podlachia. According to local tradition, the image was fished out of the Bug river in 1777. Conservators believe the icon dates from the turn of the 18th and 19th centuries, created by a folk artist. This icon was originally displayed for veneration in the Chapel of the Intercession of the Theotokos in Mielnik and was moved to the parish church after its extensive renovation in the early 20th century.

== Bibliography ==
- Kołomajska-Saeed, M., ed. (1996). Katalog zabytków sztuki w Polsce. Siemiatycze, Drohiczyn i okolice (in Polish). Warsaw: Instytut Sztuki Polskiej Akademii Nauk.
- Sosna, G.; Troc-Sosna, A. (2006). Święte miejsca i cudowne ikony. Prawosławne sanktuaria na Białostocczyźnie (in Polish). Białystok: Orthdruk. ISBN 83-85368-69-8.
- Matus, I. (2013). Schyłek unii i proces restytucji prawosławia w obwodzie białostockim w latach 30. XIX wieku (in Polish). Białystok: Wydawnictwo Uniwersytetu w Białymstoku. ISBN 978-83-7431-364-3.
