= Kopański =

Łada coat of arms, used by Kopański family

Kopański, feminine: Kopańska is a Polish surname. Notable people with the surname include:

- Ataullah Bogdan Kopański (born in 1948), Polish historian
- Jerzy Kopański (born 1957), Polish wrestler
- Stanisław Kopański (1895–1976), Polish military commander, general, politician, diplomat
