= Jerzy Nikitorowicz =

Polish academic

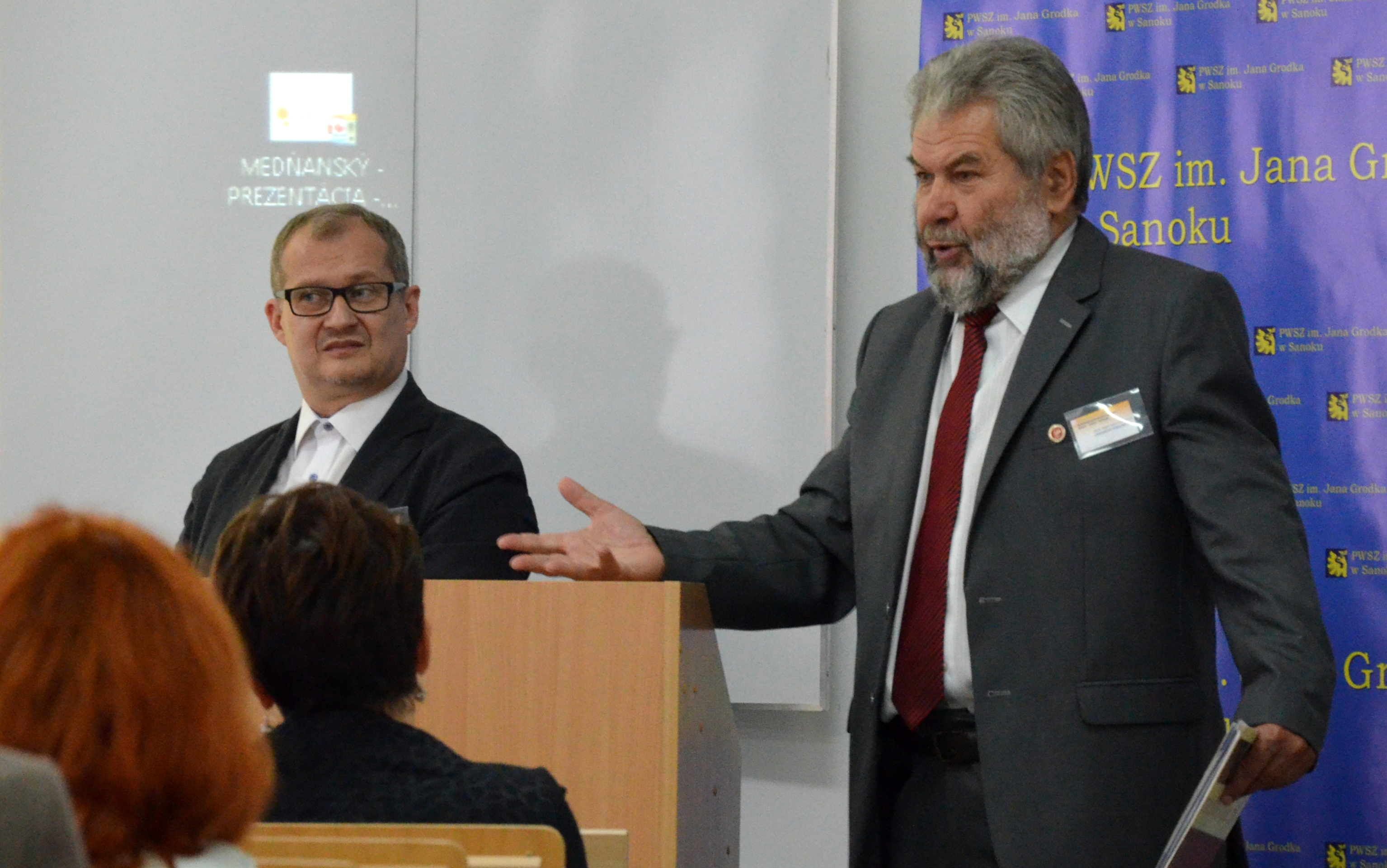
- Born: August 19, 1951 (age 75); Mielnik, People's Republic of Poland
- Education: Adam Mickiewicz University in Poznań; University of Warsaw
- Occupation: Rector of the University of Białystok
- Term: 2005–2012

Jerzy Nikitorowicz (born August 19, 1951 in Mielnik, Poland) is professor of pedagogics, dr. hab., rector of the University of Białystok, Poland (2005–2012).

== Biography ==
In 1975, he completed pedagogical studies at the Faculty of Philosophy and History of the Adam Mickiewicz University in Poznań. He obtained his doctorate in 1983 at the Faculty of Pedagogy of the University of Warsaw. He obtained his habilitation at Adam Mickiewicz University in 1993 based on his scientific achievements and a dissertation entitled Socialization and upbringing in religiously and ethically diverse families in the Białystok region. In 2001, he received the title of professor of humanities.

Since 1987, he has been professionally associated with the Branch of the University of Warsaw in Białystok, and since 1997 at the University of Białystok, where in 2005 he became a full professor. He was the head of the Department of Intercultural Education, then he became the head of the Department of Intercultural Education. He held the position of dean of the Faculty of Pedagogy and Psychology, and in the years 2005–2012, rector of the university. He was also associated with the Department of Fundamental Problems of Education of the Theological Faculty of the Christian Theological Academy in Warsaw.

Member of the Polish Pedagogical Society, International Academy of National Minorites Research, secretary of the Committee of Pedagogical Sciences of the Polish Academy of Sciences, member of the editorial and program bodies of the periodicals "The Educational Review", "Pogranicze. Social Studies", "The Europeans", as well as the councils of the University of Białystok Foundation.
