= Jan Zabłocki (lawyer) =

Polish lawyer

- Born: 20 October 1944 (age 81); Żarnówka, Poland
- Occupation: Professor of law

Academic background
- Education: Academy of Catholic Theology

Academic work
- Discipline: Legal Sciences
- Sub-discipline: Roman Law, Canon Law, Civil Law
- Institutions: Cardinal Stefan Wyszyński University

Jan Zabłocki (Note: Polish: [ˈjan zaˈbwɔt͡ski]) (born 20 October 1944) is a Polish lawyer and professor of legal sciences, specializing in Roman law, canon law, and civil law. He is a professor at the Cardinal Stefan Wyszyński University in Warsaw.

== Academic career ==
Jan Zabłocki obtained his Doctorate in legal sciences from the Academy of Catholic Theology in Warsaw (now Cardinal Stefan Wyszyński University) in 1980. His dissertation, titled "Usufruct in Classical Roman Law," was supervised by Professor Henryk Kupiszewski. In 1990, he achieved the title of Habilitated Doctor in legal sciences based on his scholarly work and his monograph "The Competences of the Patres Familias and the People's Assemblies in Family Matters in the Light of Aulus Gellius' Noctes Atticae." In 1999, he was awarded the title of Professor of Law after publishing his monograph "Reflections on Roman Legal Procedure in Aulus Gellius' Noctes Atticae."

Zabłocki was a professor at the Faculty of Law and Administration of Cardinal Stefan Wyszyński University in Warsaw, where he headed the Department of Roman Law. He also served as vice-dean from 2000 to 2002. He founded the legal journal Zeszyty Prawnicze in 2001, serving as its editor-in-chief for 20 years, and initiated the publishing series Arcana Iurisprudentiae, where he also serves as chair of the Scientific Council.

=== Promoted Doctors ===
Under his supervision, the doctoral degree was obtained by Sławomir Godek and Anna Tarwacka.

== Academic memberships ==
He was vice-chairman of the Committee on Ancient Culture Sciences at the Polish Academy of Sciences and a member of the Section of Ancient Law. He is also involved in numerous editorial boards and scientific councils, including Prawa Kanonicznego, Ius matrimoniale, Miscellanea Historico-Iuridica, Kwartalnik Prawa Publicznego, and Ius antiquum. Additionally, he is a member of the Consociatio Internationalis Studio Iuris Canonici Promovendo.

== Selected publications ==
- Usufruct in Classical Roman Law (1980)
- The Competences of the Patres Familias and the People's Assemblies in Family Matters in the Light of Aulus Gellius' Noctes Atticae (1990)
- Reflections on Roman Legal Procedure in Aulus Gellius' Noctes Atticae (1999, ISBN 83-7206-018-5)
- Public Roman Law (co-author)

== Private life ==
His wife is Professor Maria Zabłocka.
