= Łada coat of arms =

Polish coat of arms

Łada
- Alternative names: Łady, Ładzic, Mancz
- Earliest mention: 1464–1480
- Families: 210 names Bardowski, Bartosiewicz, Bartoszewicz, Bartoszowicz, Bączkowski, Bieniakoński, Bieniaszewski, Bieńkowski, Bogdanowicz, Bogdanowski, Bohdanowicz, Bohdanowski, Bondzinski, Bordowski, Borzymowski, Broda, Brodowicki, Brodowski, Broszkowski, Bródka, Brudnicki. Chodakowski, Chojnowski, Ciszkiewicz, Ciszko, Ciszkowicz, Cybulski, Cyrus-Sobolewski, Czaprański, Czarnowski, Czerniachowski, Czerniak, Czerniakowski, Czernichowski, Czerniechowski. Dąbrowa, Dobkowski, Dobryszewski, Dobryszowski, Dobrzyniecki, Dobrzyszewski, Dogel, Dogiel, Dzierżanowski. Falk-Regulski. Gierałtowski, Gierkowski, Glatowski, Gnatowski, Goreczkowski, Góreczkowski, Grabowski, Gradecki, Gramnicki, Grącki, Grądzki, Grodecki, Grodzicki, Grodzki, Gromnicki, Groński. Herman. Jacek, Janikowski, Jankowski, Janowicz, Januszewicz, Januszewski, Januszowski, Jasiński. Kamiński, Kapuszczewski, Kęski, Kiłdjarowicz, Kitajgrodzki, Klimowicz, Kłodnicki, Kłodzieński, Kłodziński, Kobyliński, Kokoszczyc, Kokoszka, Konstański, Kopański, Koronowski, Korziuk, Kotowski, Kowalewski, Krassowski, Krczytowski, Kroczowski, Kruszewski, Kucz, Kuczewski, Kulicki, Kurnatowski, Kustrzycki. Ladowicki, Lipski, Lutosławski. Łachański, Łaciński, Łada, Ładjanski, Ładjánszki, Ładomirski, Ładowicki, Ładowski, Ładzic, Ładzicki, Łapa, Łapiński, Łappa, Łappo, Łaszkiewicz, Łatko, Łazomski, Łazowski, Łobaczewski, Łobaszewski, Łopata, Łopatko, Łukasiewicz Mandecki, Mazarski, Michałowski, Milanowski, Młosoł, Młosoła, Mocarski, Moczarski, Moczulski, Możarowski, Mrocki, Mussoła, Musuła. Noskowski. Omorowski, Otocki. Pieskiewicz, Pieszkiewicz, Pieszkowski, Pilch, Pilchowski, Pomorski, Proszkowski, Prószyński, Pruszkowski, Przezdziecki. Radostowski, Rechej, Regulski, Remberowicz, Rembertowski, Rembiertowski, Rendzina, Rendziński, Rędzina, Rędziński, Rozbicki, Rożniszewski, Rybowski, Rzędziński. Sandrowicz, Scenia, Siderkiewicz, Skrzyński, Skupski, Służowiecki, Smarzyński, Smerczyński, Smereczyński, Smerżyński, Sobolewski, Sucharzewski, Suliński, Szopa vel Rędzina, Szuniewicz. Świdlicki, Świetlicki. Tabański, Tabeński, Trąbski, Trąmbski, Tyborowski, Tyszecki. Walicki, Wąsowicz, Wąsowski, Wład, Wojchowski, Wojciechowski, Wysocki. Zabłocki, Zaleski, Zaleszczyński, Zalewski, Zamuszkiewicz, Zaorski, Zarciszewski, Zawadzki, Zawistowski, Zawiszowski, Zborzyński, Zgorzelski, Zwoliński (also: Zwolański, Zwoleński); Łada III: Sobolewski, Wilczek

Łada (Łady, Ładzic, Mancz) is a Polish szlachta coat of arms originating from Mazovia.

== History ==
The earliest mention of the coat of arms comes from court records from 1401. The earliest attestation of the seal appears in 1466 in the document of the Peace of Toruń.

The earliest heraldic source mentioning the Łada coat of arms is Insignia seu clenodia Regis et Regni Poloniae historian Jan Długosz, dated 1464-1480. He records information about the coat of arms among the 71 oldest Polish noble coats of arms in the passage: "Lada, que ex domo Accipitrum deriuationem sumpsit, deferens babatum cruce signatum et in uno cornu sagittam, in altero retortam, in campo rubeo. Lada a nomine dee Polonice, que in Mazouia in loco et in villa Lada colebatur, vocabulum sumpsit exinde.". According to Długosz it derives from Jastrzębiec family and derived the name from an alleged Polish goddess Łada worshipped in the village of Łada in Mazovia.

== Blazon ==
According to Długosz: red, a horseshoe argent, silver horseshoe pointing downwards, surmounted of a golden cross pattée; on the right, a silver arrow in a pale, on the left, an arrow with a pall pointing downwards; in the crest, a golden half-leaf in a crown with a sword in its right paw.

However, the Herbarz Arsenalski (c. 1535-1555) describes the coat of arms as red, a horseshoe with the caulkins pointing upwards, a cross pattée in the center, and the letters A and V above the caulkins.

Łada III

According to the Herby Rycerztwa Polskiego (1584), the background was blue and the arrows were pointing upwards (III).

Łada IV

The version with hunting horns under the horseshoe (IV) does not appear until the 18th century on the initiative of the illustrator of Korona polska by Kasper Niesiecki, who probably used block from earlier books on coats of arms to illustrate the Łada, reworking them in various ways.

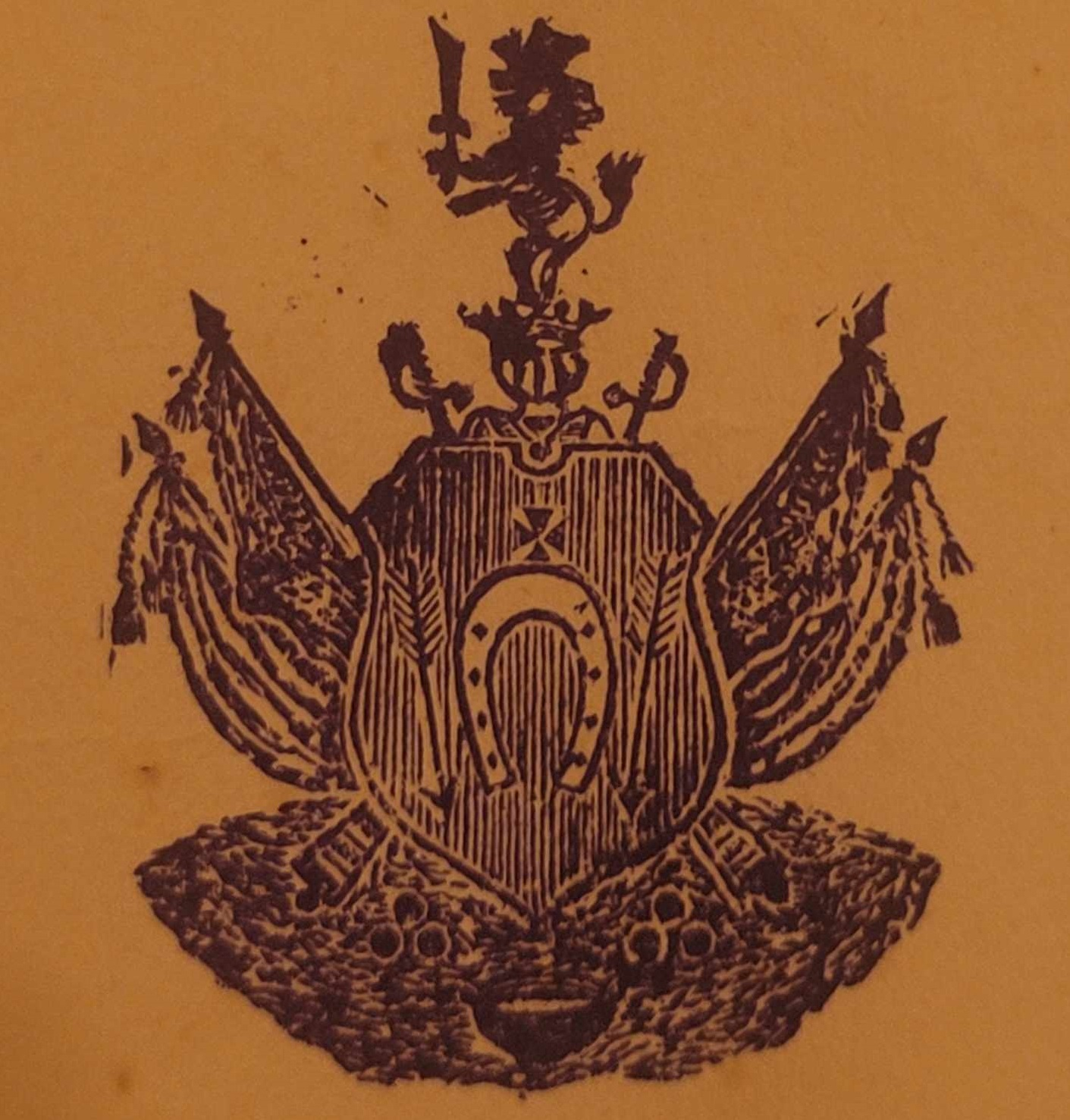
Stamped Bondzinski/Łada Coat of Arms

The coat of arms found in the Bondziński family nobility documents, although uncoloured, depicts a shield bearing a horseshoe with its ends pointing upward and a small cross above it — a composition associated with the Polish Lada coat of arms. The crest above the helmet shows a lion holding a sword, symbolizing courage and martial valor.

On each side of the shield, there are banners mounted on spears, emphasizing knightly heritage. The base beneath the shield displays ornamental ground and rounded shapes, possibly representing fruits.

The abundance of weaponry — including swords, spears, and the lion with a raised blade — suggests that the Bondziński family had military roots or traditions of service in arms. The document was confirmed in 1905 under the authority of the Russian Empire, during the reign of Tsar Nicholas II.

== Bibliography ==
- Kamocki, Franciszek (1925). Geneza dwu godeł w herbie Łada (in Polish). Warszawa.
- Niesiecki, Kasper (2005). "Łada". In Minakowski, Marek; Boniecki, Adam (eds.). Herbarz Polski (in Polish). Vol. 6. Kraków. ISBN 83-918058-3-2.
- Gajl, Tadeusz (2007). Herbarz Polski (in Polish). Gdańsk.
