= Jan Zabłocki (officer) =

Polish major

Jan Zabłocki (c. 1757 – ?) was a Polish major of the 12 Crown Pedestrian Regiment (infantry unit of the military of the Polish–Lithuanian Commonwealth), participant in the Polish–Russian War of 1792, decorated with the war order of Virtuti Militari.

== Bibliography ==
- Spis Kawalerów Orderu Virtuti Militari z 1792 roku, Archiwum Główne Akt Dawnych, Archiwum Królestwa Polskiego, signature 178, pages 133-134.
- Mariusz Machynia, Czesław Srzednicki, Wojsko koronne. Piechota. Kraków 1998.
- Xsięga pamiątkowa w 50-letnią rocznicę powstania roku 1830 zawierająca spis imienny dowódców i sztabs-oficerów, tudzież oficerów, podoficerów i żołnierzy Armii Polskiej w tymż roku Krzyżem Wojskowym „Virtuti Militari” ozdobionych (A commemorative book on the 50-year anniversary of the uprising of 1830 containing a list of names of commanders and staff-officers, as well as officers, non-commissioned officers and soldiers of the Polish Army in the same year with the "Virtuti Militari" Military Cross decorated with), Lwów 1881, page 86.
