= University of Białystok =

Public university in Białystok, Poland

- Uniwersytet w Białymstoku
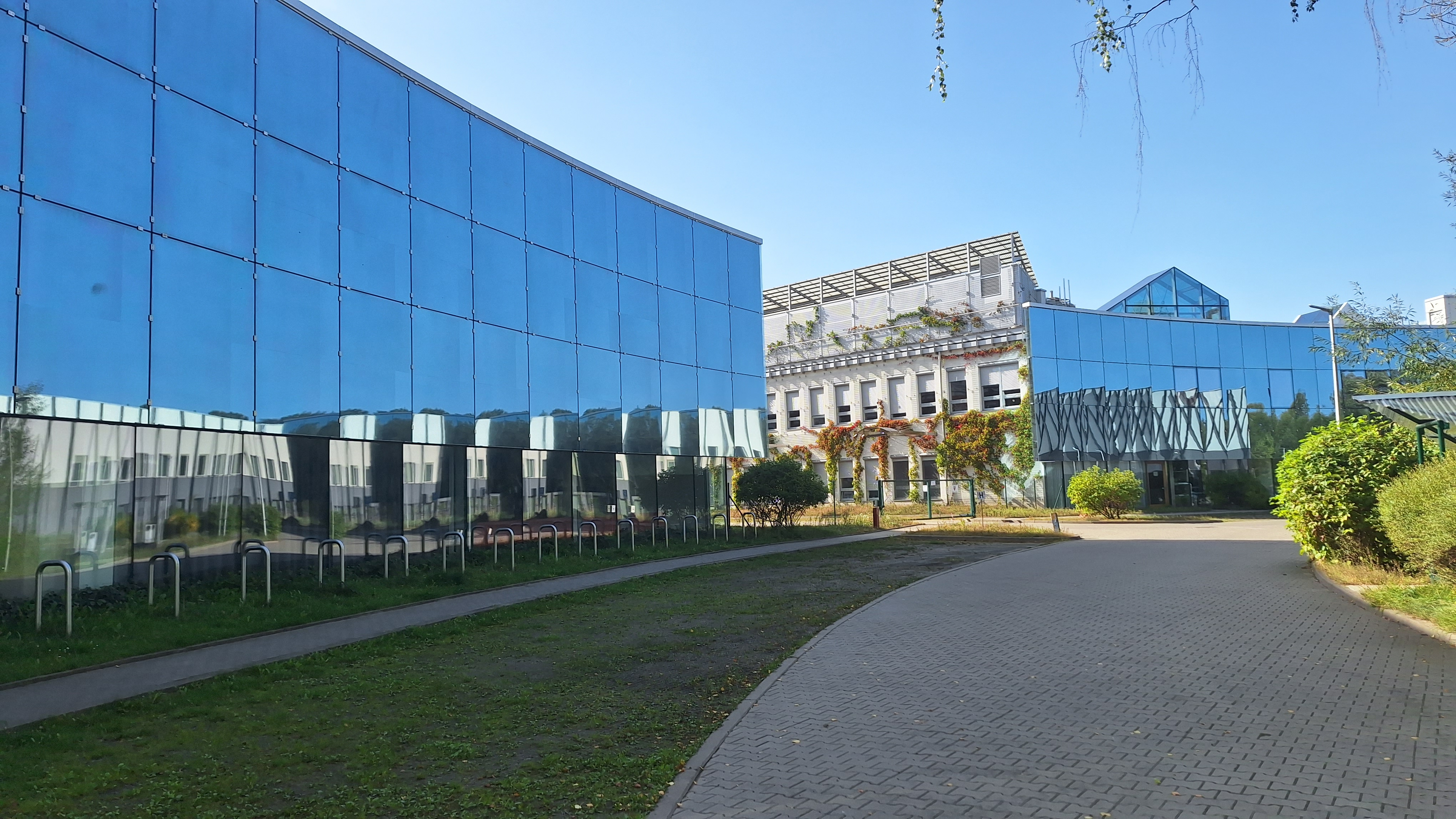
- Campus in Ciołkowskiego street
- Latin: Universitas Bialostocensis
- Type: Public
- Established: June 19, 1997; 29 years ago
- Affiliations: Socrates-Erasmus
- Rector: Robert Ciborowski
- Administrative staff: 808
- Students: 7,972 (12.2023)
- Location: Świerkowa 20B, 15-328, Białystok, Poland; 53°7′40″N 23°9′30″E
- Website: www.uwb.edu.pl

University rankings

Regional – Overall
- QS Emerging Europe and Central Asia: 180 (2022)

The University of Bialystok is the largest university in the north-eastern region of Poland, educating in various fields of study, including humanities, social and natural sciences and mathematics. It has nine faculties, including a foreign one in Vilnius. Four faculties have been awarded the highest scientific category “A”. The University of Bialystok has the right to confer doctoral degrees in ten fields, as well as postdoctoral degrees in law, economics, chemistry, biology, history and physics.

Over 13,000 students are being educated in 31 fields of study, including doctoral studies and postgraduate studies. The university employs nearly 800 academics, almost 200 professors among them.

Every year the university carries out approximately 60 research projects, financed from domestic and foreign funds; it also benefits from the structural funds. Among the university's many accomplishments are its participation in 6th and 7th Framework Programme for Research, Technological Development and Demonstration, Horizon 2020, Comenius and Aspera as well as the DAPHNE III programme.

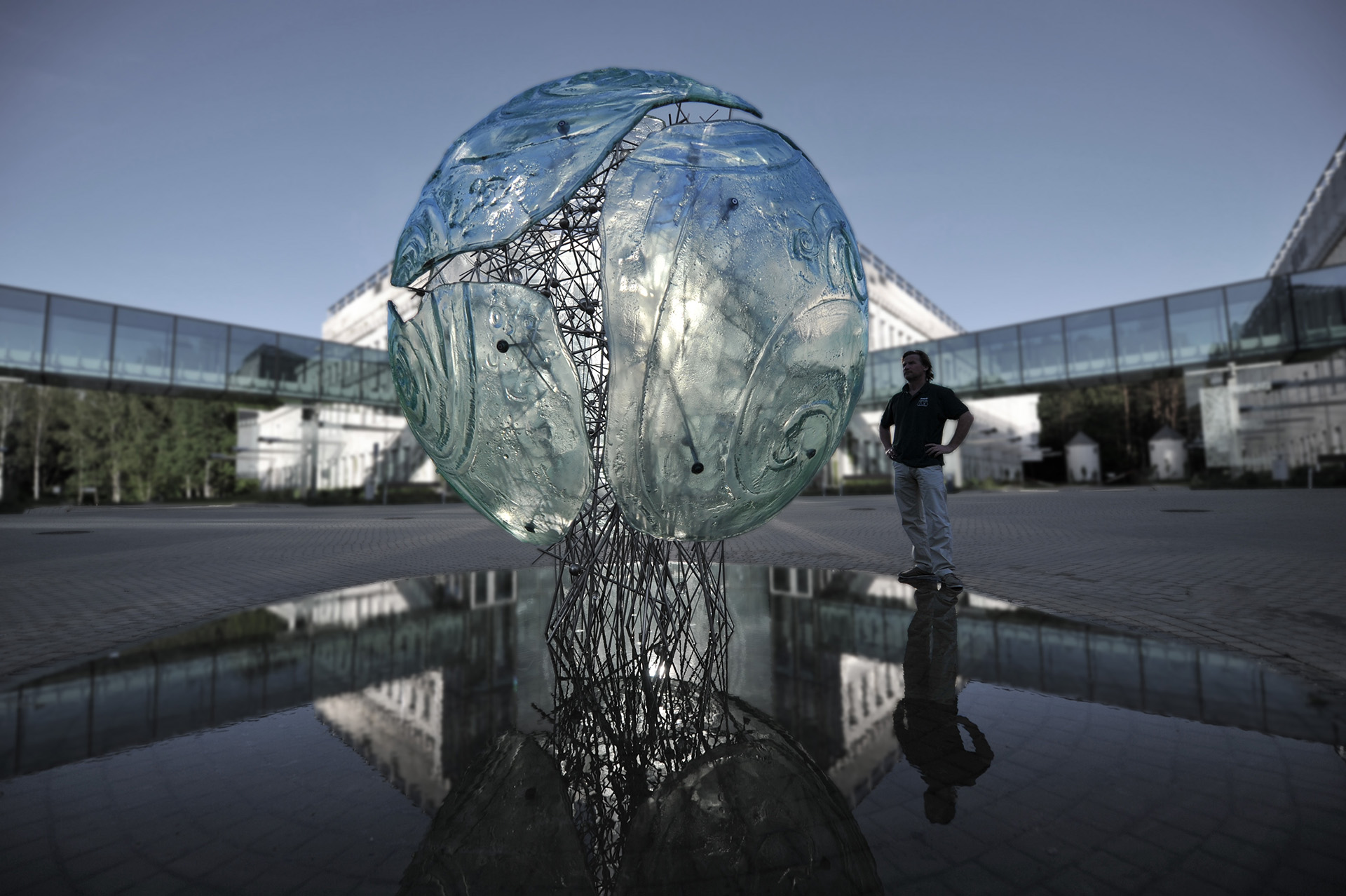
Campus in Ciołkowskiego Street

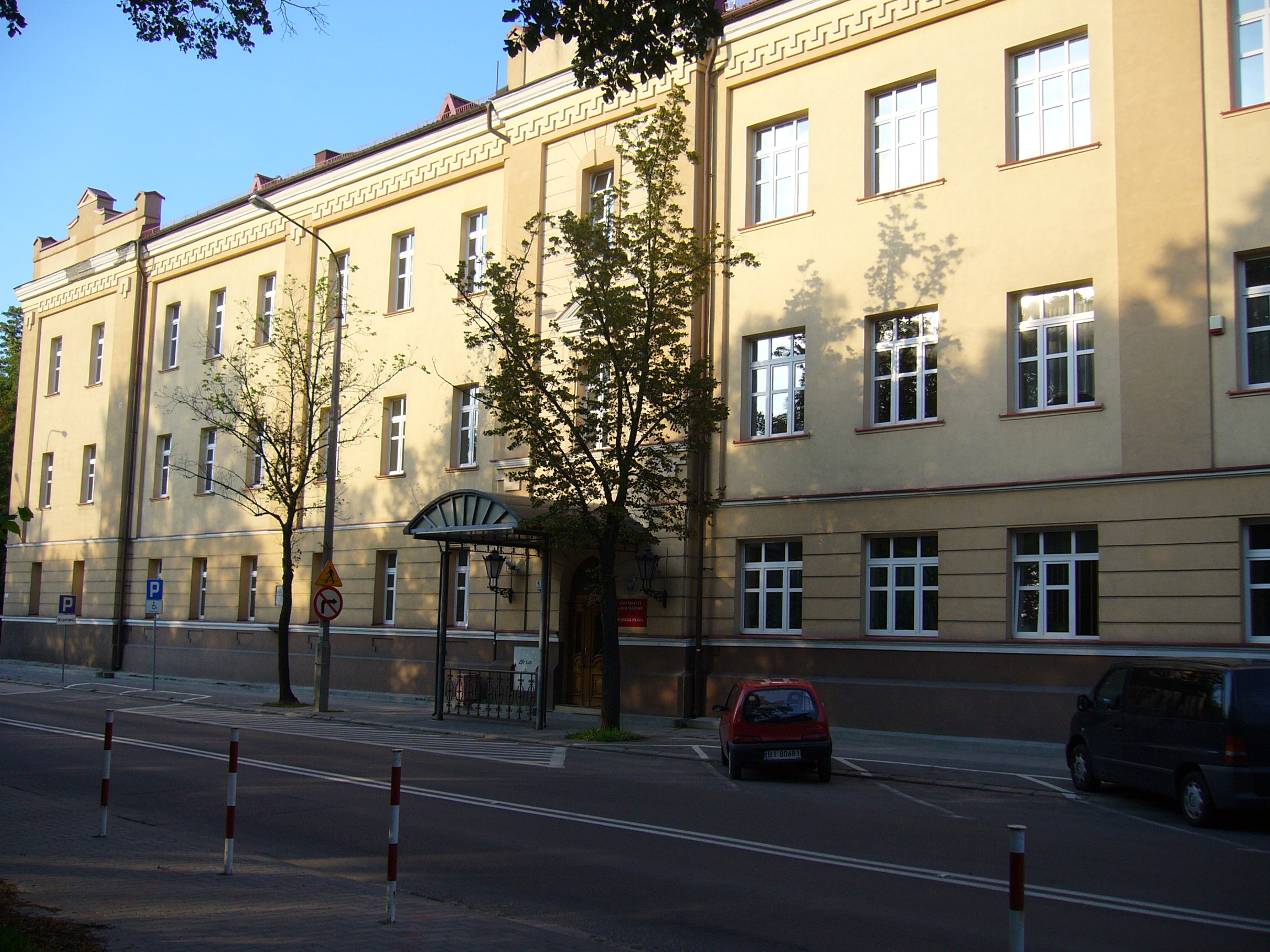
Faculty of Law, Mickiewicza 1 street

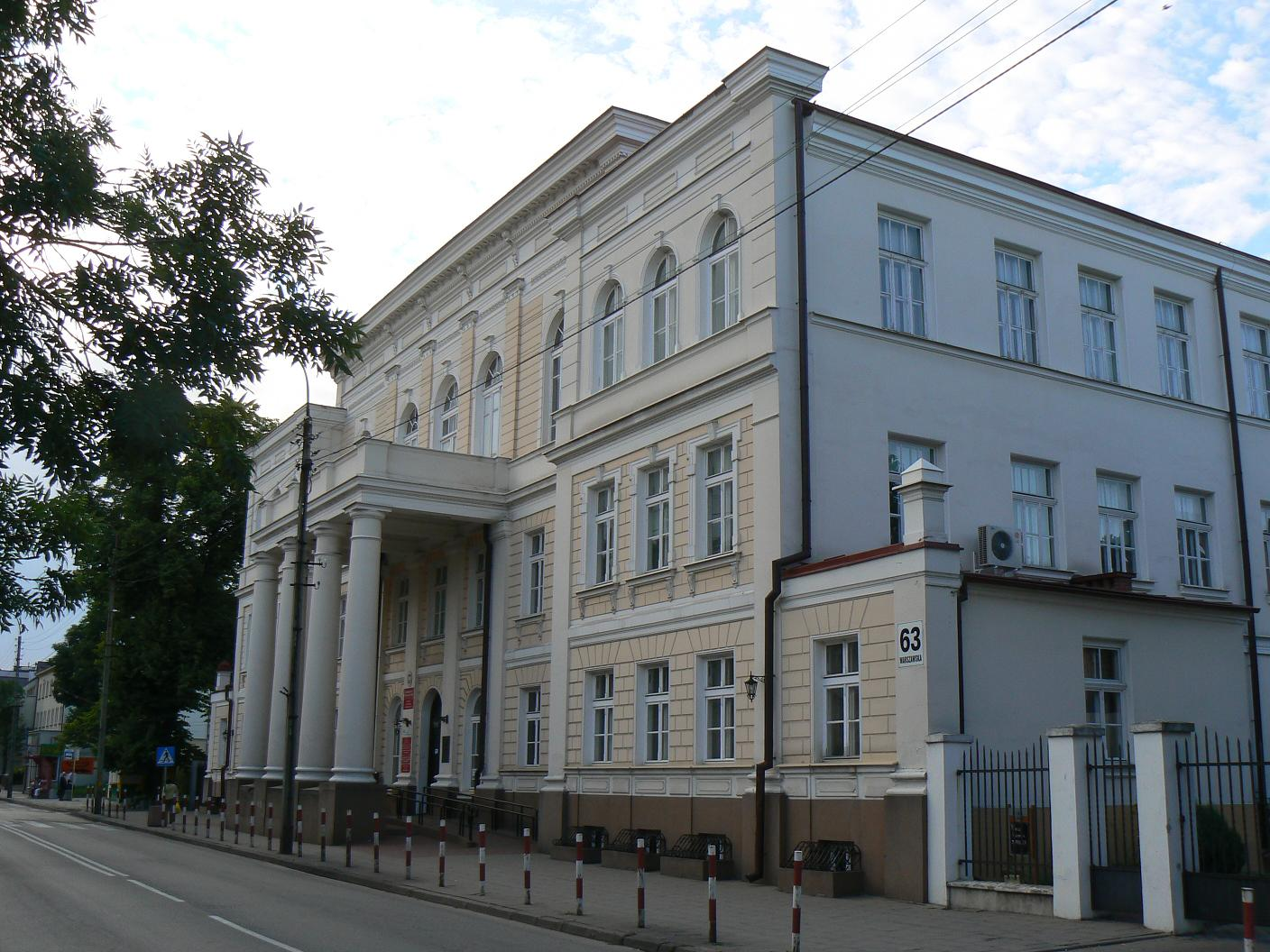
Faculty of Economics, Warszawska 63 street

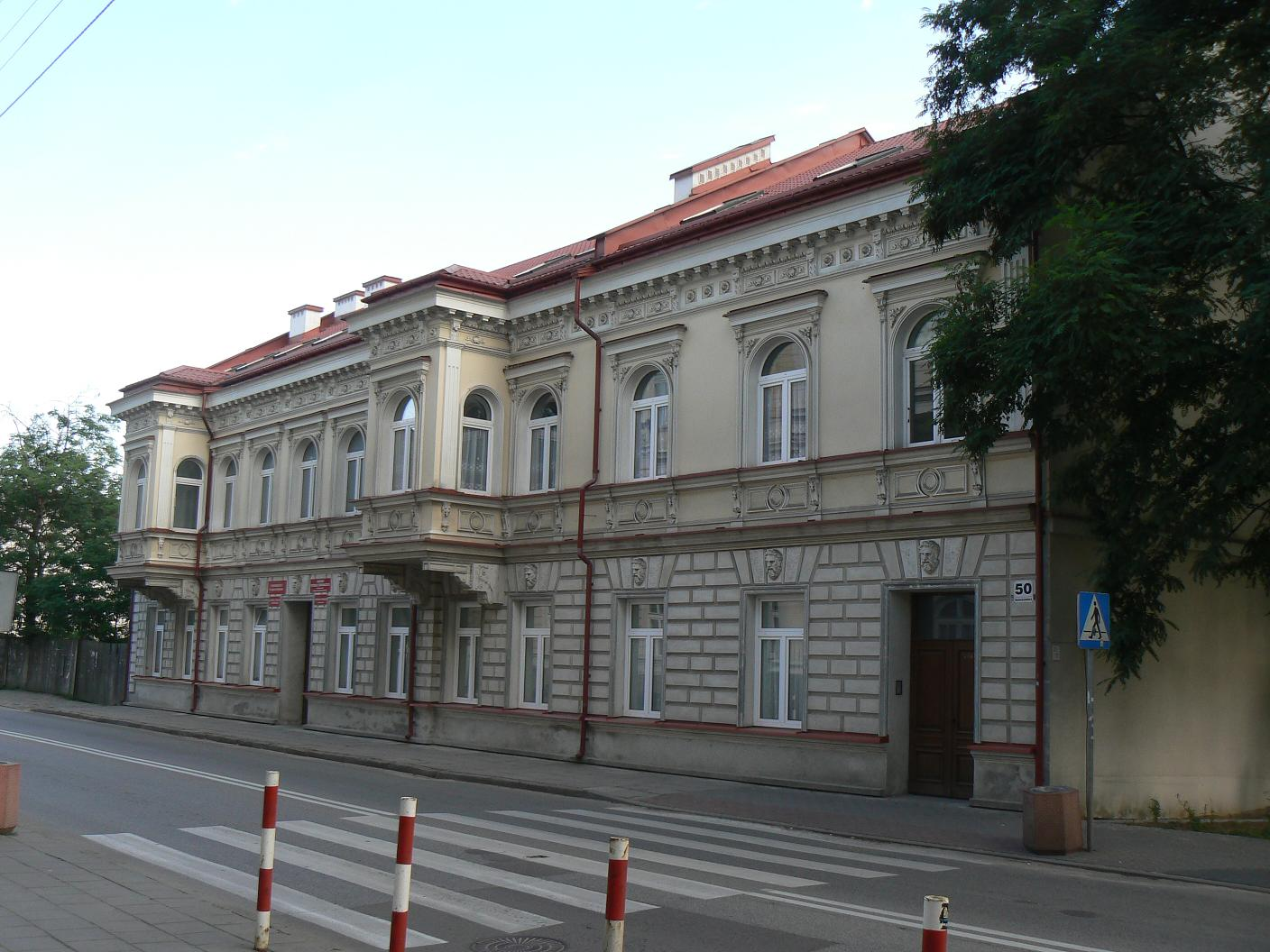
Faculty of Theology, Warszawska 50 street

== History ==
After the end of World War II and the establishment a communist regime in the form of the Polish People's Republic, a proposal arose to establish a higher humanities school in Białystok, prompted by the desire of academics from Vilnius University (which became part of the Soviet Union), to settle there. Although local and political authorities recognized the need for such a university, the economic climate at the time did not favour the implementation of the project as well as the shortage of personnel in northeastern Poland in professions requiring economic knowledge and in the teaching profession.

On July 15, 1968, by order of the Minister of Education and Higher Education, Professor Henryk Jabłoński, the Białystok Branch of the University of Warsaw was established as a higher vocational institute called Higher Pedagogical School (Polish: Wyższa Szkoła Nauczycielska). The order specified provisions concerning its supervision, management, and organization. The Branch was subordinated to the University of Warsaw in both organizational and academic matters. It was directly supervised by the university's Vice-Rector, while its internal organization was determined by the Rector. Teaching was provided by staff employed at the Branch as well as by faculty from other University units delegated by the Rector. The Branch operated with its own budget and staffing structure, separate from those of the University of Warsaw.

On July 20, 1968, the Minister of Education and Higher Education issued an order defining the mission and scope of work for the newly established institution. Although the typescript of this order exists, its content is widely known, and it has been cited by numerous authors, the document itself is absent from officially published legal records. Nevertheless, the regulations took effect, and at the start of the 1968/1969 academic year, the Białystok Branch of the University of Warsaw began operating as the Higher Pedagogical School. Three faculties were created at that time: Humanities, Mathematics and Natural Sciences, and Elementary Education.

On September 29, 1972, a decree was issued by the Minister of Science, Higher Education, and Technology Jan Marian Kaczmarek granting the Białystok Branch of the University of Warsaw the right to establish its own organizational structure. This decree resulted in the transformation of the school into a university with a full academic profile on October 1, 1972, and the introduction of a single four-year master's degree program and a three-year vocational program.

In December 1981, during the growing political tensions in the country and the subsequent imposing of Martial law, there were growing protests among students of the university. Mirosław Gołębiewski, a student in the university who had witnessed the attempted arrest of his father, Feliks Gołębiewski (former chairman of a local Inter-Enterprise Coordination Committee), relayed the news regarding the beginning of the martial law to his colleagues at the local branch of the Independent Students' Association. A campaign was then launched to secure Strike Committee and NZS documents and printing equipment, transporting them to the Students dormitories.

In the 1980s a public discussion emerged concerning the independence of the Białystok Branch of Warsaw University. In June 1982, at the 21st Session of the Municipal National Council in Białystok, a motion to transform the Białystok Branch of the University of Warsaw into an independent university was passed. In July of that year, the Senate of the University of Warsaw presented its official position regarding the Branch's future, and the Voivodeship National Council in Białystok resolved that "it is advisable, justified, and necessary to create conditions in Białystok for the establishment of a university as soon as possible" entrusting the Voivode of Białystok Voivodeship with ensuring the smooth operation of the future university.

At the end of 1983, Order No. 48 of the Minister of Science, Higher Education, and Technology created a working group to refine the programmatic and organizational concept for the planned University of Białystok. The team brought together representatives from scientific, administrative, and political bodies across three neighbouring voivodeships. Their findings, compiled in the document Programmatic and Organizational Concept of the University of Białystok were submitted to the Minister in June 1984. A month later, the Patriotic Movement for National Rebirth established the Citizens’ Committee for the University of Białystok. In December 1984, during its third session, the Białystok Voivodeship Council endorsed these efforts and tasked the Voivode of Białystok Voivodeship with preparing a detailed timetable for further development.

=== Modern period ===
In the early 1990s, none of the departments at the Białystok Branch held the right to confer habilitation degrees, and only the Faculty of Economics was authorized to award the doctoral degree in economics. This situation created a significant obstacle to changing the Branch's institutional status. During discussions on the matter, the idea also emerged of integrating five higher education institutions in the city: the Białystok Branch of the University of Warsaw, the Medical Academy, the Branch of the Academy of Music, the Puppetry Department of the State Higher School of Theatre, and the Archdiocesan Higher Seminary. In January 1992, the Temporary Integration Council of Higher Education Institutions was established. In June of that same year, preliminary assumptions for the statute of the University of Białystok were prepared. Subsequently, in March 1993, the Senate of the University of Warsaw, with the support of the Senate Committee of the University of Białystok, adopted a resolution requesting the senates of Białystok's institutions to state their positions on a potential merger that would lead to the creation of the University of Białystok. Although this initiative was ultimately abandoned, efforts aimed at establishing an independent university continued.

In June 1994, a meeting was held with Deputy Prime Ministers Aleksander Łuczak and Włodzimierz Cimoszewicz at an extraordinary meeting of the Senate Committee of the University of Warsaw for the Białystok Branch. Meetings were also held with members of parliament from various political groups in the region, as well as discussions with the voivode and the city mayor, which yielded positive messages and conclusions. On March 15, 1995, the Senate of the University of Warsaw adopted a resolution to grant independence to the Białystok Branch, contingent upon its compliance with the formal requirements established by the General Council of Higher Education. These requirements included the right to confer postdoctoral degrees in two fields of study and doctoral degrees in one field. At that time, the Białystok Branch possessed doctoral qualifications in history, economics, and law, and was awaiting the decision of the Central Commission for Academic Degrees in the field of pedagogy.

==== Independent university ====
In February 1997, Minister of National Education Professor Jerzy Wiatr approved a decision that had been rejected just two months earlier. Soon after, the government led by Prime Minister Włodzimierz Cimoszewicz adopted a resolution to establish the university. On May 14, 1997, the Senate of the University of Warsaw unanimously voted in favour of granting the Białystok Branch of the University of Warsaw independence with a resolution declaring that the university would be established in October of the same year. The University of Warsaw Senate set the condition that at least one of the faculties would have the right to confer habilitations (the Faculty of Law). The Rector of the University of Warsaw, prof. Włodzimierz Siwicki, though skeptical, agreed. On June 1, the Sejm of the Republic of Poland passed the Act on the Establishment of the University of Białystok, which was signed-into-law in August by the President of Poland. On October 1, 1997, the university opened the academic for the first time as a fully independent institution.

In March 2006, city mayor, Ryszard Tur, in a letter to Professor Jerzy Nikitorowicz, Rector of the University of Białystok, proposed a 33-hectare plot on Ciołkowskiego Street as the site for the construction of a new campus which would be the future base of the university, uniting a number of buildins located throughout the city. He also promised that the investment would be included in the currently revised spatial development plan. On June 8, 2006, at the Wedding Palace in Białystok, Tur formally signed an agreement with Professor Jerzy Nikitorowicz regarding the construction of the University of Białystok Campus. Construction of the campus began in 2008.

The university has a branch in Vilnius, Lithuania.

== Campus ==
The early years of the university were characterized by difficult conditions: the rooms in which university classes were held were scattered throughout the city. Most were not suitable for lectures or even tutorials, as before they were transferred to the university, they housed offices and bureaus. There was a shortage of tables and chairs everywhere, and the secretariats lacked equipment such as typewriters and calculating machines. In the 1974/1975 academic year, the Branch had at its disposal buildings on Mickiewicza, Świerkowa, Marchlewskiego and Lipowa streets, and on Piłsudski Avenue, Białystok. In that period, plans were developed for the construction of a university campus in Krywlany, and in 1979, plans were made for the construction of new facilities on Mickiewicza Street. This vision, although in a modified form, was not realized until the 21st century with the new campus opening in 2015. In the 1983/1984 academic year, the Branch became the occupier of the premises on Próchniaka Street, leasing the building at 14 Skłodowskiej-Curie Street. The intention was to acquire the building formerly occupied by the Technical School of Economics on Warszawska Street. In early April 1990, the Independent Students' Association of the Białystok Branch of the University of Warsaw issued an appeal, recalling that three months had already passed since the occupation of the former seat of the communist party, and that the mayor of Białystok was delaying the transfer of the building to the Białystok university. The threat of squandering the opportunity to improve the housing situation at the University of Warsaw was becoming real. Consequently, the Independent Students' Association called on all employees and students to gather at the Citizens' Committee headquarters on the corner of Lenina (now Branickiego) and Elektryczna Streets to exert pressure and quickly resolve the matter. The students' actions resulted in a positive resolution. In May 1990, city surveyor Zdzisław Niemotko, acting on the orders of Mayor Czaban, issued a formal decision to transfer the building of the Provincial Committee of the Polish United Workers' Party to the University of Warsaw Branch. The university authorities located the Faculty of Humanities there. After the establishment of the University of Białystok in 1997, the Faculties of Sociology and History and Philology were housed there.

In 2024 the construction for a new building for the faculty of humanities began in the university campus in Ciołkowskiego street.

== Staff ==
- Professors: 162
- Habilitated doctors: 7
- Senior lecturers: 291
- Teachers (total): 348
- Total staff: 808
- Number of students: 15 034

=== Rectors ===
- Adam Jamróz (1997–2002)
- Marek Gębczyński (2002–2005)
- Jerzy Nikitorowicz (2005–2012)
- Leonard Etel (2012–2016)
- Robert CIborowski (since 2016)

== Faculties ==
=== Faculty of Biology ===
Faculty of Biology was created in 2019, after split of Biology-Chemistry Faculty. The seat of faculty is in university campus, at 1J Ciołkowski Street.

1st Grade Studies

- Biology
- Biotechnology
- Expert of Biodiversity
- Eco-Business

2nd Grade Studies

- Biology
- Biotechnology

=== Faculty of Chemistry ===
Faculty of Chemistry was created in 2019, after split of Biology-Chemistry Faculty. The seat of faculty is in university campus, at 1K Ciołkowski Street.

1st Grade Studies

- Chemistry
- Quality and Safety of Environment

2nd Grade Studies

- Chemistry
- Criminalistic and Judicial Chemistry
- Applied Chemistry

=== Faculty of Economics and Finance ===
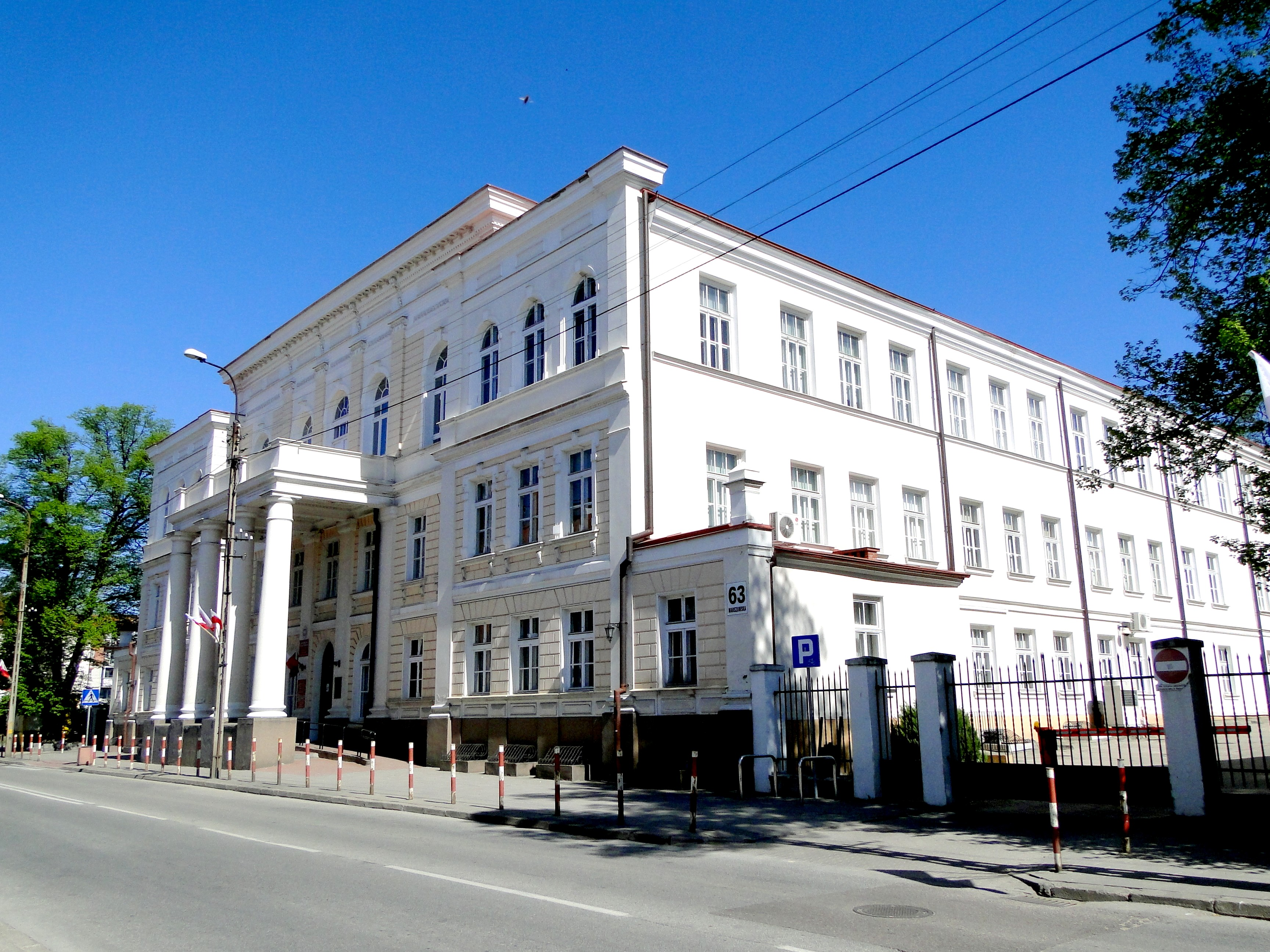
Seat of Faculty of Economics and Finance

Economic Faculty was created in 1968. After few transformations, since 2019 exists with current name. During all this time, the seat of this faculty is in historic building at 63 Warszawska Street.

Studies (1st and 2nd Grade)

- Economics
- Economics-Law

=== Faculty of Philology ===
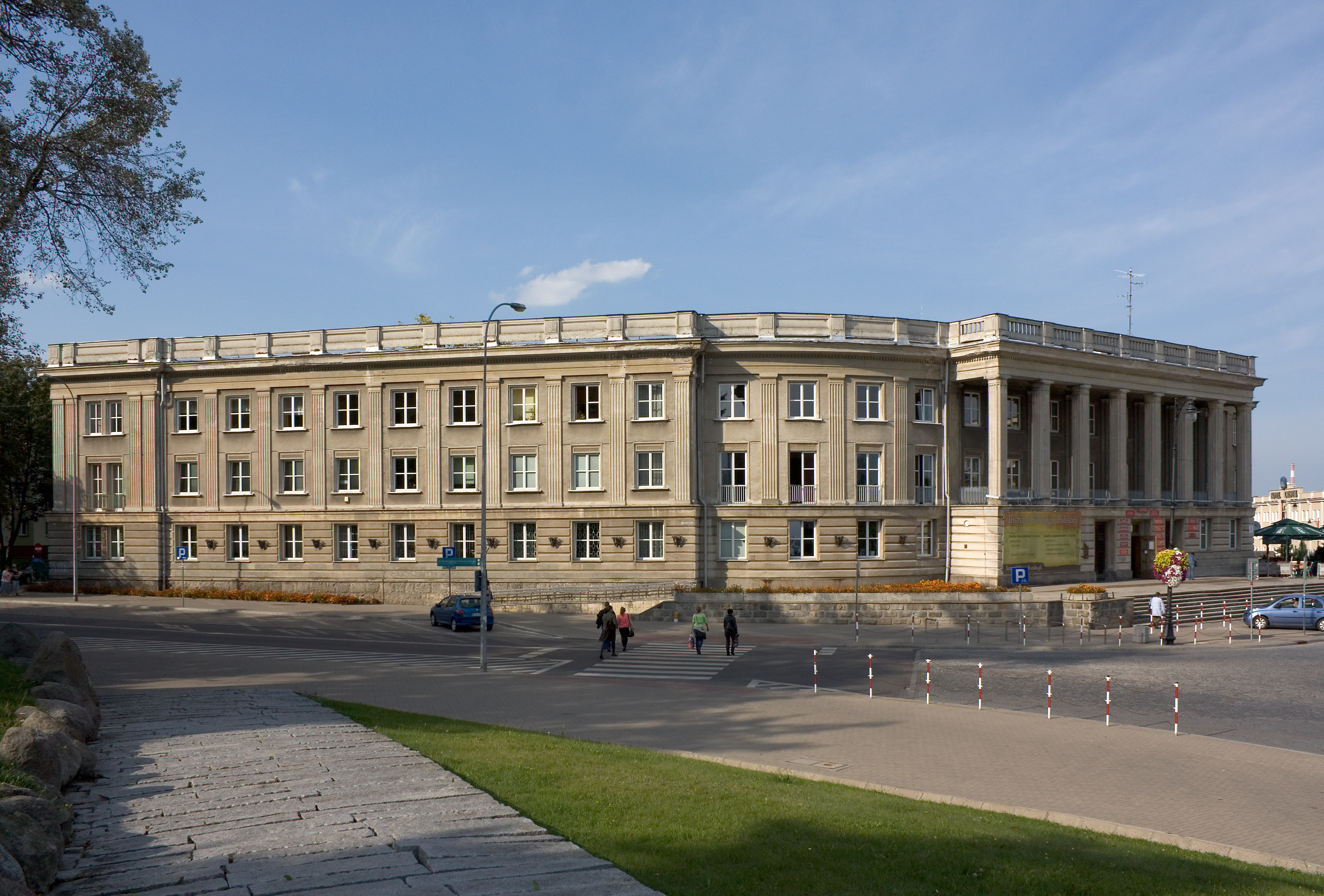
Seat of Faculty of Philology, Philosophy, History and Sociology

Faculty of Philology was created in 1997, after split of Humanistic Faculty. The seat of this faculty is at 1 NZS Square.

1st Grade Studies

- Belarusian Ethnophilology
- Polish Philology
- French Philology
- Russian Philology
- English Philology
- Creative Writing

2nd Grade Studies

- Foreign Teacher Philology
- Polish Philology
- Russian Philology
- English Philology
- Polish Teacher Philology

=== Faculty of Philosophy and Cognitive Science ===
This faculty was created in 2019, after the split of History-Sociologic Faculty. Until 2023, it was the Institut of Philosophy. The seat of this faculty is at 1 NZS Square.

1st Grade Studies

- Cognitive Science and Communication

2nd Grade Studies

- Philosophy
- Cognitive Science and Communication

=== Faculty of Physics ===
Faculty of Physics was created in 2007, after split of Mathematics-Physics Faculty. The seat of faculty is in university campus, at 1L Ciołkowski Street.

1st Grade Studies

- Physics
- Medical Physics
- Physics of Computer Games and Robots

2nd Grade Studies

- Experimental Physics
- Theoretical Physics
- Medical Physics

=== Faculty of History ===
Faculty of History was created in 2023. Before this year, History Studies were at: Humanistic Faculty (1968–1997), Historical-Sociological Faculty (1997–2019) and Faculty of History and International Relation. The seat of this faculty is at 1 NZS Square, at "Home of Party" (former seat of Voivodship Committee of Polish United Worker's Party), currently (in 2025) is building new seat of this faculty at university campus.

Studies (1st and 2nd Grade)

- History
- Eastern Studies
- Public Diplomacy

=== Faculty of Informatics ===
This faculty was created in 2019, after the split of Mathematics-Informatics Faculty. Until 2023, it was as Institute of Informatics. The seat of this faculty is in university campus, at 1M Ciołkowski Street.

Studies (1st and 2nd Grade)

- Informatics

=== Faculty of Mathematics ===
Faculty of Mathematics was created in 2019, after split of Mathematics-Informatics Faculty. The seat of faculty is in university campus, at 1M Ciołkowski Street.

Studies (1st and 2nd Grade)

- Mathematics

=== Faculty of Education Sciences ===
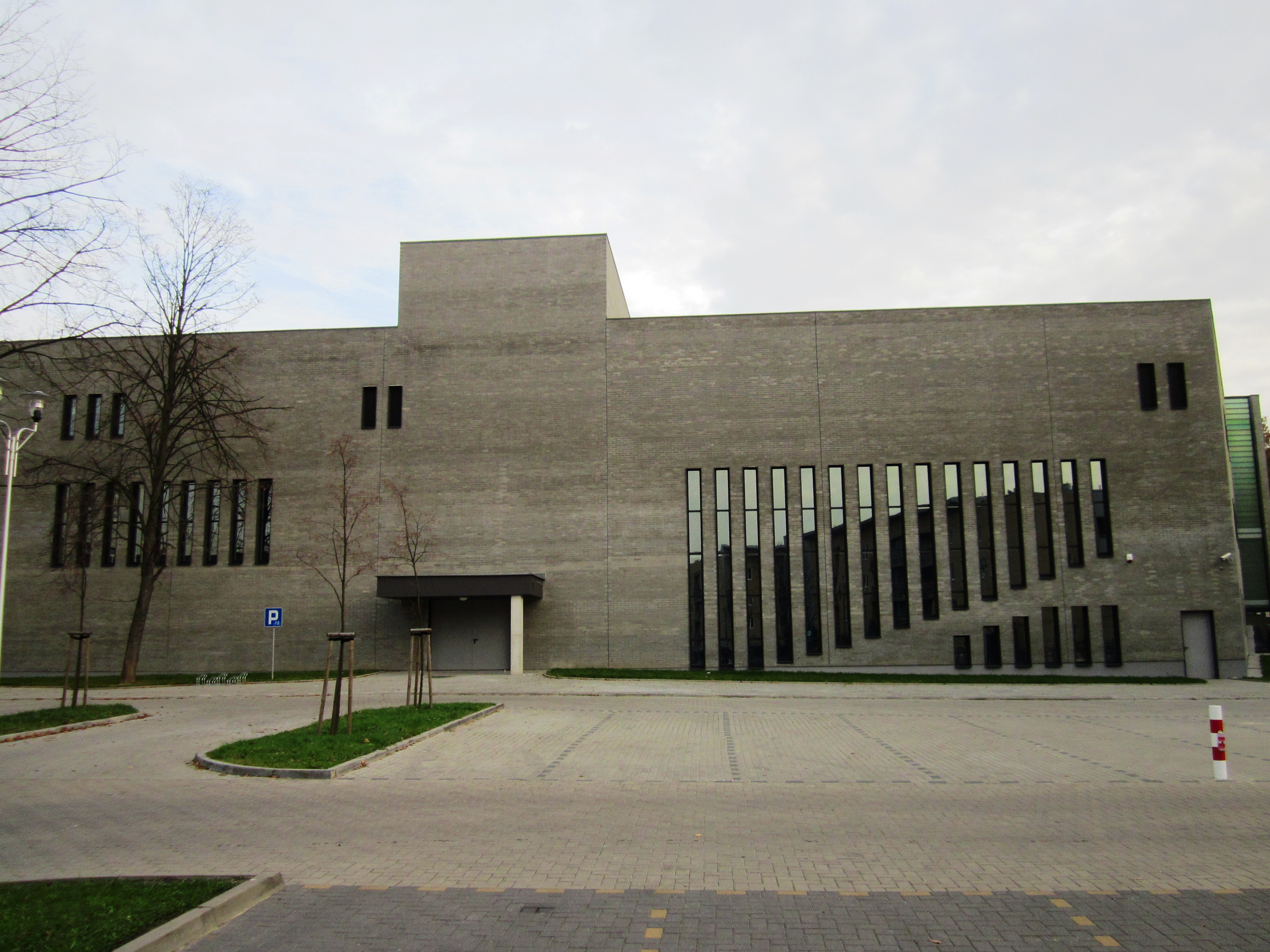
Seat of Faculty of Education Sciences and Cultural Studies

High School teaching teachers to their occupation was created in 1968 as High Teacher School. After some changes, it exists with current name since 2019. The seat of this faculty is at 20 Świerkowa Street.

1st Grade Studies

- Caring-Educational Pedagogics
- Resocializating Pedagogics
- Social Work

2nd Grade Studies

- Caring-Educational Pedagogics
- Resocializating Pedagogics
- Social Work
- Creative Resocialization with arteterapy

=== Faculty of Law ===
This faculty was created in 1990. The seat of this faculty is at 1 Mickiewicz Street.

1st Grade Studies

- Administration
- Safety and Law
- Criminology

2nd Grade Studies

- Administration
- Safety and Law
- Criminology
- Criminalistics

=== Faculty of Sociology ===
This faculty was created in 2023, after transformation of former Institute of Sociology. The seat of this faculty is at 1 NZS Square.

Studies (1st and 2nd Grade)

- Sociology

=== Faculty of International Relations ===
This faculty was created in 2023, after the split of Faculty of History and International Relations. The seat of this faculty is in university campus, at 1K Ciołkowski Street.

Studies (1st and 2nd Grade)"

- International Relations

=== Faculty of Cultural Studies ===
This faculty was created in 2019, after split of History-Sociology Faculty. Until 2023, this faculty was the Institute of Cultural Studies. The seat of this faculty is at 1 NZS Square.

1st Grade Studies

- Media and Communication
- Advertising and Public Relations

2nd Grade Studies

- Digital Media Communication
- Film Studies
- Culture and Nature of Podlasie

=== Faculty of Management ===
This faculty was created in 2019, after the split of Faculty of Economy and Management. Until 2023, this faculty existed as Institute of Management. The seat of this faculty is at 63 Warszawska Street.

Studies (1st and 2nd Grade)

- Management

=== Faculty of Economics and Informatics in Vilnius ===
This faculty was created in 2007. It was the first branch of Unlituanian university in Lithuania and first branch of Polish university abroad. The seat of this faculty is at 143 Kalvarijų Street.

1st Grade Studies

- Economics
- Informatics
- European Studies

2nd Grade Studies

- Economics

== Foundation ==
The University of Bialystok Foundation, Universitas Bialostocensis (Polish: Fundacja Uniwersytetu w Białymstoku Universitas Bialostocensis) is an independent, non-profit, non-governmental organization located in Białystok, Poland.

Foundation was chartered on April 22, 2004, by founders from the academic circles of the University of Białystok. Foundation is governed by an independent Board of Directors. Foundation aims organizational, material and financial support for the academic excellence and future development of the University of Bialystok. It runs such activities as: lectures, seminars, conferences, courses and workshops, business and legal consulting, participation in EU funding programs, providing financial support for academic projects and student scholarships, support students’ organizations at the University of Bialystok.

== International cooperation ==
International cooperation is also carried out based on about 200 bilateral agreements with institutions from the EU within the framework of the Erasmus programme.

As the first university in the country the University of Białystok launched a foreign branch in Vilnius, Lithuania; the Faculty of Economics and Informatics has been created there, which educates people of mostly Polish origin, but it is also increasingly popular among the Lithuanian youth.

In 2013 the University of Białystok initiated the creation of an international consortium of universities from Poland, Lithuania, Belarus, Ukraine and Russia under the name of Border University Network. It is composed of 10 universities. Cooperation shall include applying jointly for international grants, joint research projects, exchange of research and implementation services.
