= Koberskiy =

Koberskiy is a Russian surname. Notable people with the surname include:

- Denis Koberskiy (born 1974), Russian footballer
- Vitali Koberskiy (born 1946), Russian footballer and coach

== See also ==
- Kobierski
