= Siedlce =

- City county
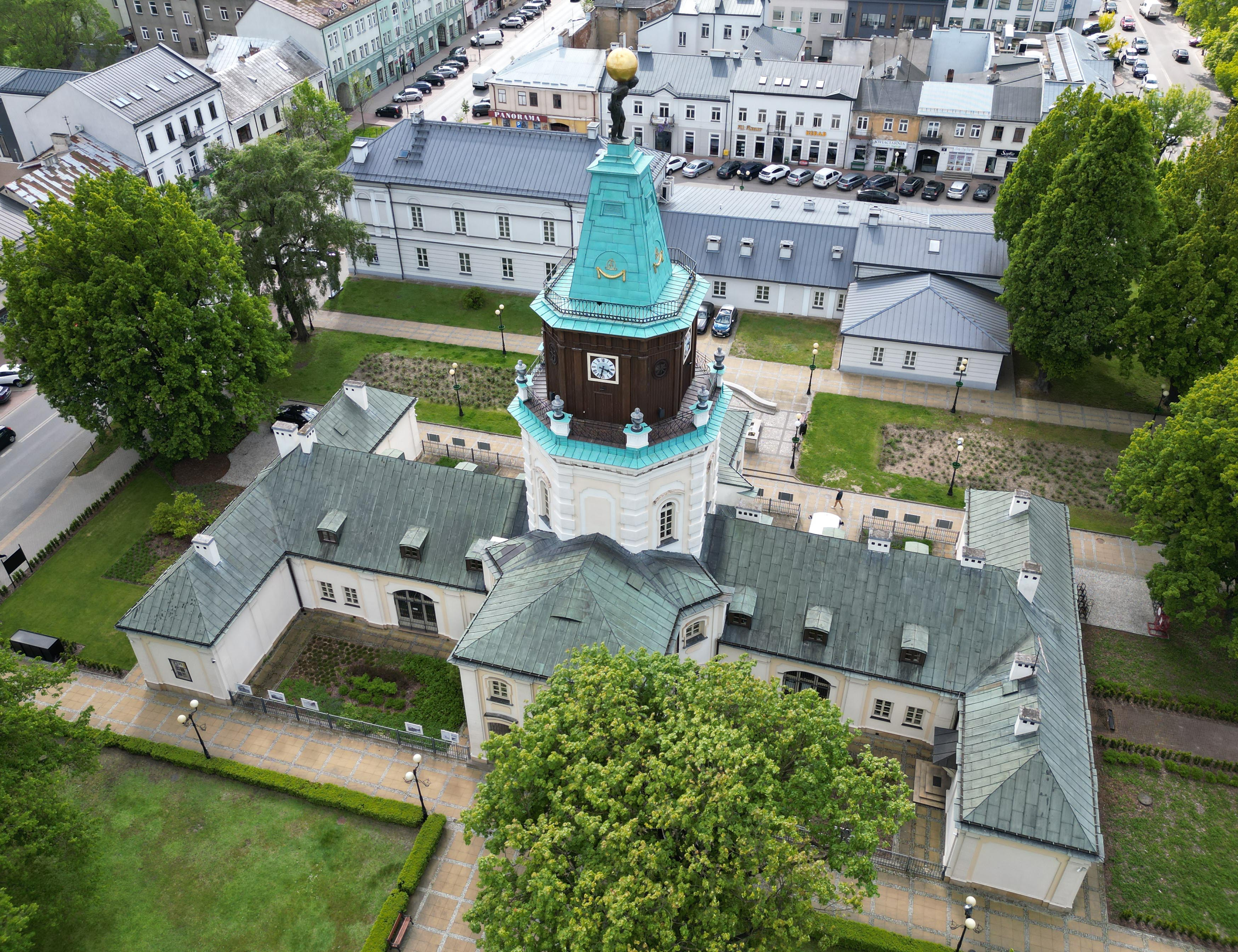
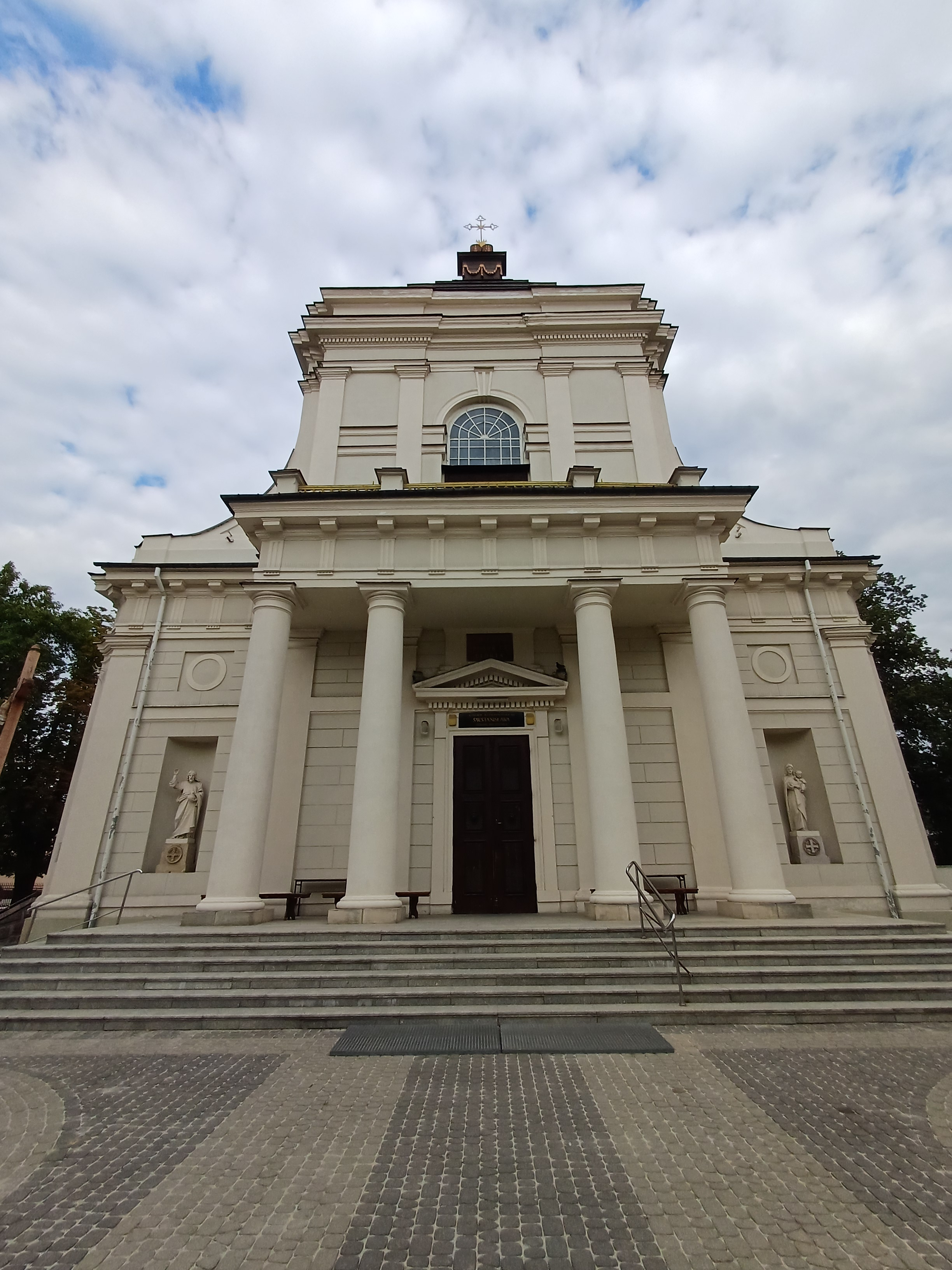
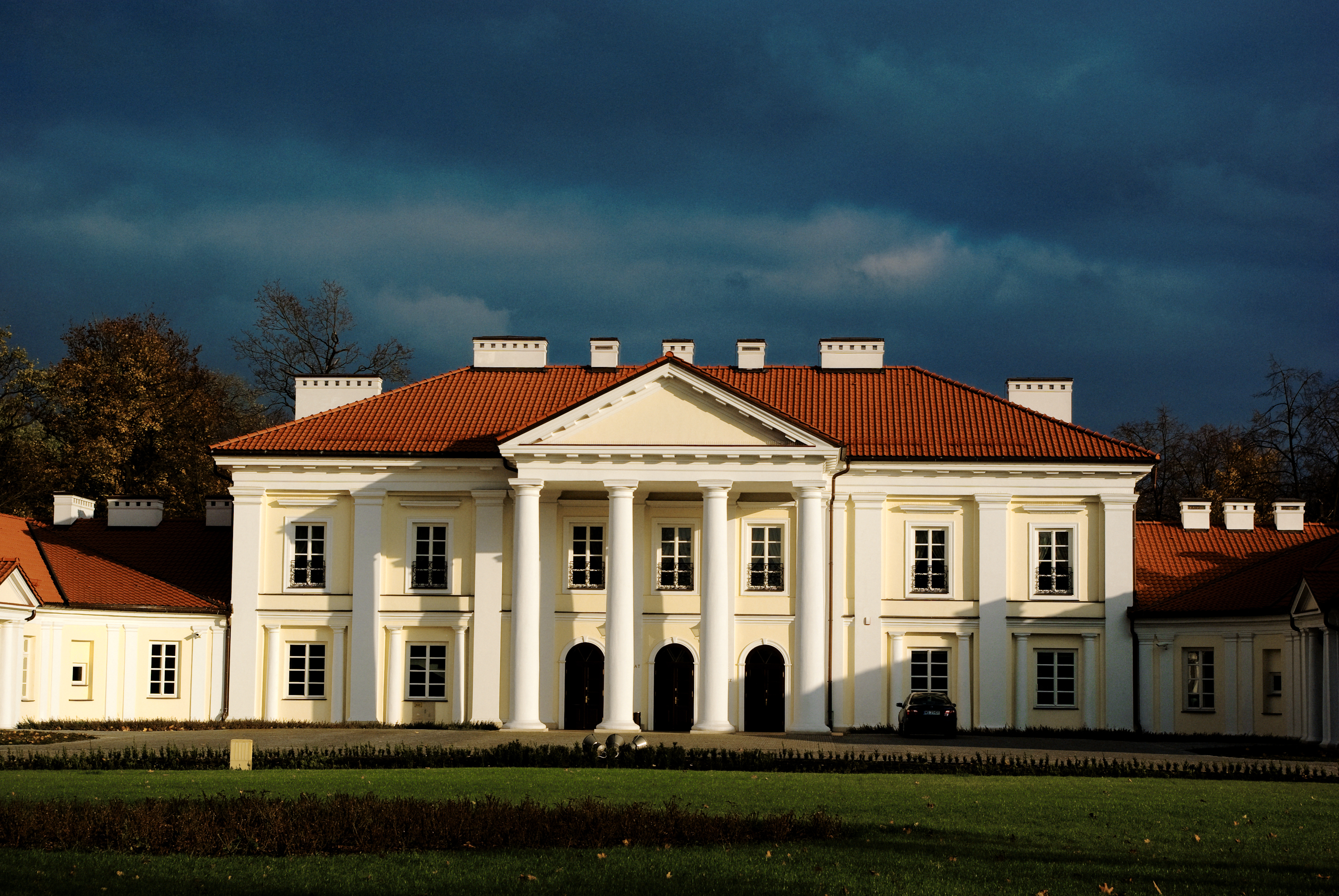
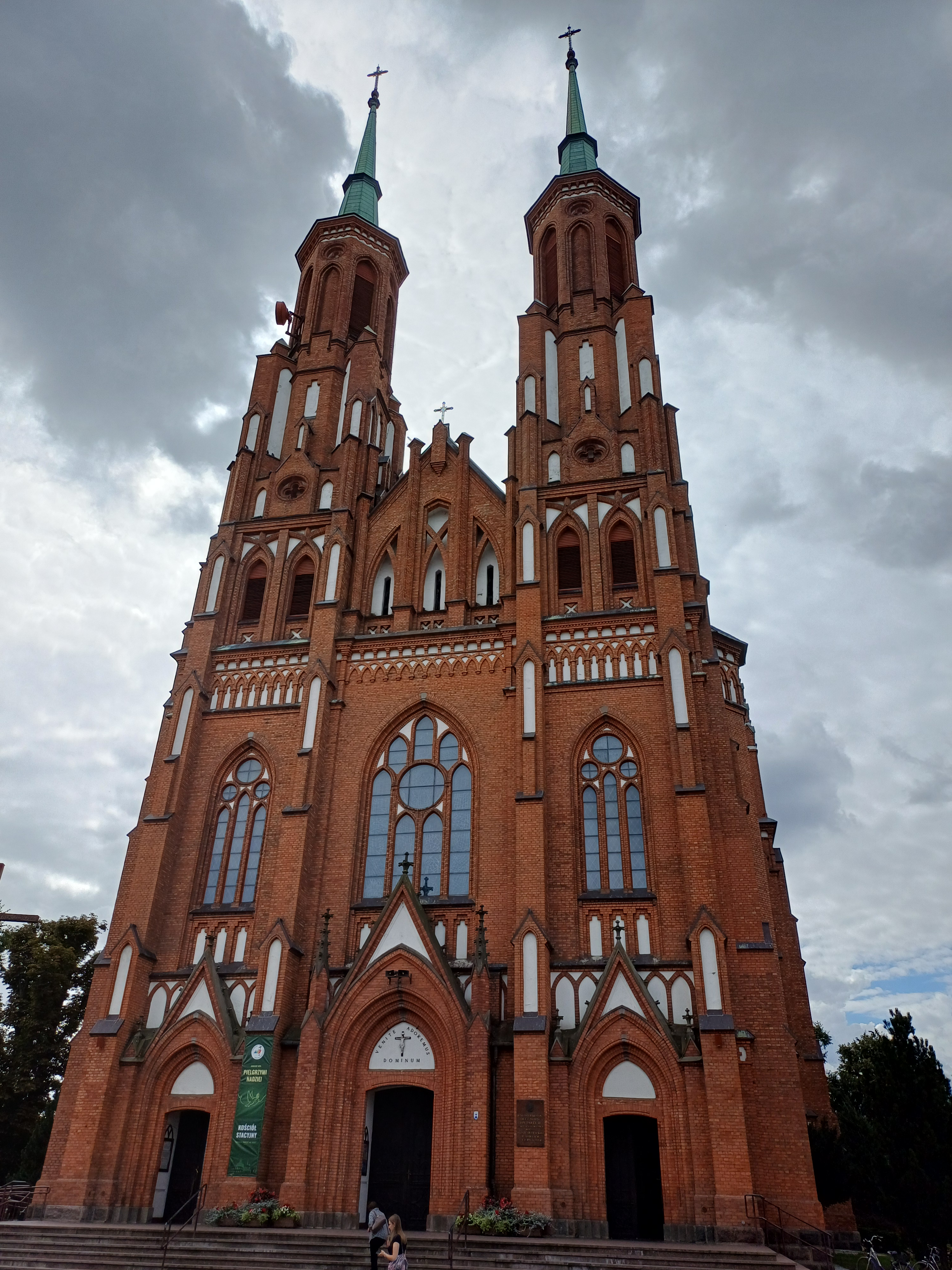
- Town Hall and Kościuszko Square St Stanislaus Church Ogiński Palace Cathedral

- Flag Coat of arms

- Location within Poland
- Coordinates: 52°9′54″N 22°16′17″E
- Country: Poland
- Voivodeship: Masovian
- County: City county
- First mentioned: 1448
- City rights: 1547

Government
  - City mayor: Tomasz Hapunowicz (PiS)

Area
  - Total: 32 km^{2} (12 sq mi)
- Elevation: 155 m (509 ft)

Population (31 December 2024)
  - Total: 74,780 ▼
- Time zone: UTC+1 (CET)
  - Summer (DST): UTC+2 (CEST)
- Postal code: 08-100 to 08–119
- Area code: +48 25
- Car plates: WS
- Website: http://www.siedlce.pl/

Siedlce (Polish pronunciation: ['ɕɛdlt͡sɛ]) (Note: Yiddish: שעדליץ Shedlits) is a city in the Masovian Voivodeship in eastern Poland with 74,780 inhabitants (as of 2024).

The city is situated between two small rivers, the Muchawka and the Helenka, around 90 kilometres (56 mi) east of Warsaw. It is the fourth largest city of the Masovian Voivodeship, and the seat of the Roman Catholic Diocese of Siedlce. Siedlce is a local educational, cultural and sports center, with a university, a notable rugby club and two important museums. It also hosts a garrison of the Polish Armed Forces.

First recorded in the medieval period, Siedlce is a former residential city of prominent Polish magnate families of Czartoryski and Ogiński, under whose patronage it became an important cultural center in Poland. The city contains several landmarks in various styles, especially Baroque and Neoclassical, including the Ogiński Palace and Park ensemble. Siedlce served as a provincial capital from 1809 to 1912 and from 1975 to 1998.

== History ==
The city, which is a part of the historical province of Lesser Poland, was most probably founded some time before the 15th century, and was first mentioned as Siedlecz in a document issued in 1448. In 1503, local nobleman Daniel Siedlecki erected a new village of the same name nearby, together with a church. In 1547 the town was granted Magdeburg rights by King Sigismund the Old. Siedlce as an urban center was created after a merger of the two neighboring villages. It was a private town, administratively located in the Lublin Voivodeship in the Lesser Poland Province. In the 16th century, and until the mid-17th century, Siedlce prospered, with its population quickly growing and a number of artisans opening their shops here.

Siedlce on a painting by Zygmunt Vogel from 1791

The period of prosperity ended during the Swedish invasion of Poland (1655–1660), when Siedlce, together with most Lesser Poland's towns and cities, was burned by the Cossacks, Tatars, Muscovities, Swedes and the Transylvanians. After these conflicts, the town belonged to the Czartoryski family, as a dowry of Joanna Olędzka, who married Prince Michał Jerzy Czartoryski. In 1692 Siedlce burned again, and the destruction was used by Kazimierz Czartoryski, the son of Michał Jerzy, to plan a new, modern market square, together with adjacent streets. In the first half of the 18th century, a new parish church was built. In 1775, after Aleksandra Czartoryska married Hetman Michał Kazimierz Ogiński, the town passed over to the Ogiński family. At that time Siedlce emerged as one of the most important cultural centers of the nation. The Ogiński Palace was visited by several notable artists and writers, such as Franciszek Karpiński, and Julian Ursyn Niemcewicz. King Stanisław August Poniatowski visited the palace twice, in 1783 and 1793. Due to efforts of Aleksandra Ogińska, several improvements took place in Siedlce. Among them, a new town hall was built, which now is one of the symbols of the city.

=== Partitions of Poland ===
Siedlce remained a private town until the military Partitions of Poland, when it changed hands several times. During the third partition of Poland (1795), Siedlce was annexed by the Habsburg Empire, and became the seat of Kreisamt (1795–1809) in the Austrian Partition.

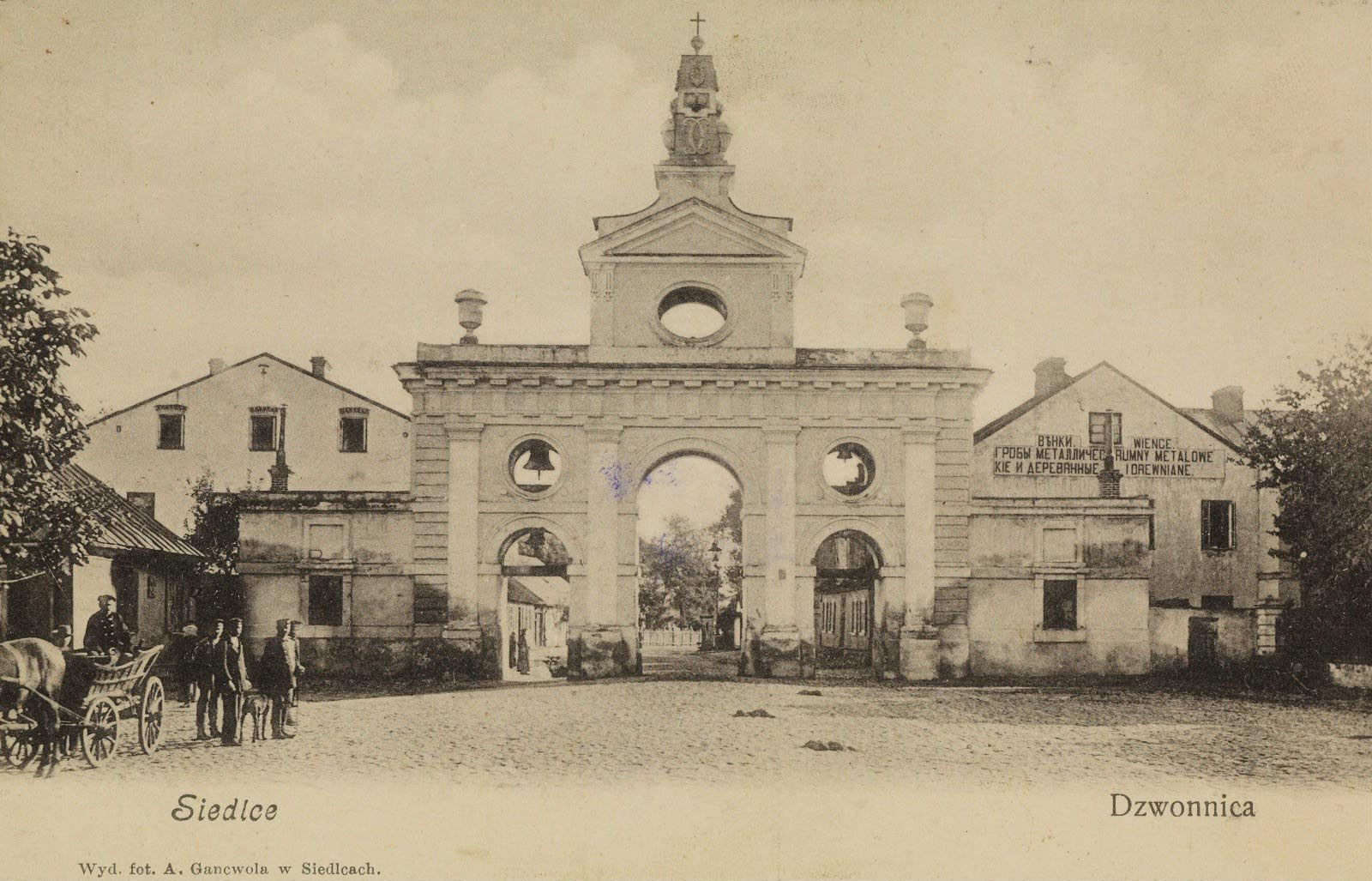
Entrance gate to the city in the 1910s

After the Polish victory in the Austro-Polish War of 1809, it was regained by Poles and included within the short-lived Polish Duchy of Warsaw, within which it was the capital of the Siedlce Department. After the duchy's dissolution in 1815, during the creation of the Russian-controlled Congress Poland (1815), Siedlce became the seat of the new Podlaskie Voivodeship, and later the Podlasie Governorate. During the November Uprising against Russian domination, the Battle of Iganie (10 April 1831) took place near the town. In the January Uprising of 1863, Siedlce was again an important center of the anti-Tsarist rebellion. In 1867 the Siedlce Governorate was created. Siedlce continued to develop with new administration buildings, a post office complex, a courthouse, and a new prison. In the late 19th century, Siedlce became an important railroad junction, with connections to Warsaw (completed 1866), Brest Litovsk (1867), Małkinia Górna (1884), and Czeremcha (1906). In the beginning of the 20th century, local students launched a protest against the ruthless Russification policies. Subsequently, in 1906 the Russian secret police organized the Siedlce pogrom in order to terrorize the locals. At that time, Siedlce was an important center of Jewish culture, with Jews making up 50% of the population.

=== Interbellum and World War II ===
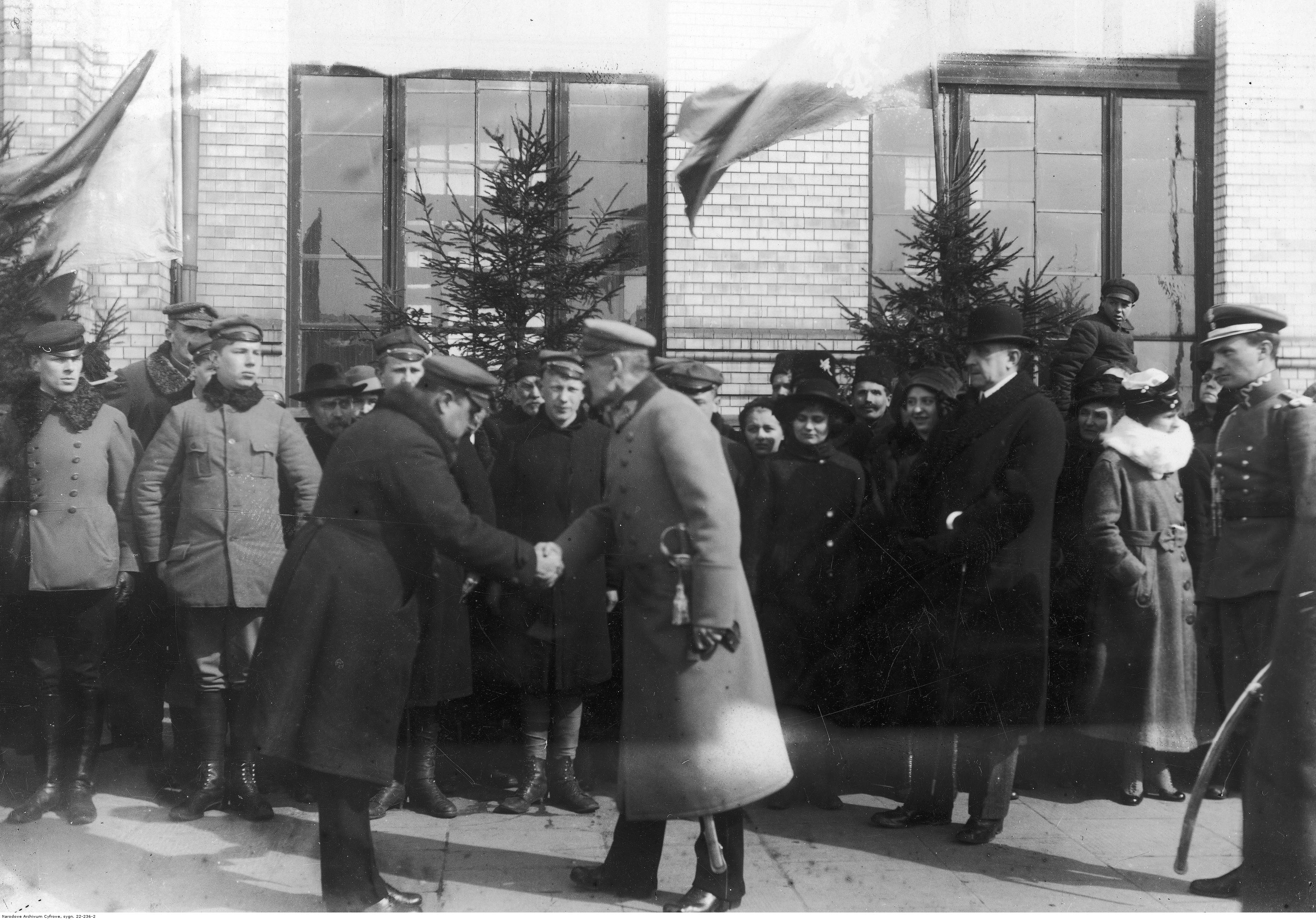
Marshall Józef Piłsudski during his visit in Siedlce in 1919

In the Second Polish Republic, since the return to independence in 1918, Siedlce belonged to the Lublin Voivodeship (1919–39) in the central part of the country (unlike today) with the provincial capital in Lublin. During the Polish–Soviet War, the city was briefly captured by the Russians, and then recaptured by Poles on 17 August 1920. On 19 August 1920, after the Polish victory in the Battle of Warsaw, Marshal Józef Piłsudski, Prime Minister Wincenty Witos and Minister Maciej Rataj held a meeting in the city. Within interwar Poland, the city remained an important rail junction and was the location of a military garrison, where the 9th Infantry Division was stationed before the German-Soviet invasion of Poland, which started World War II in September 1939.

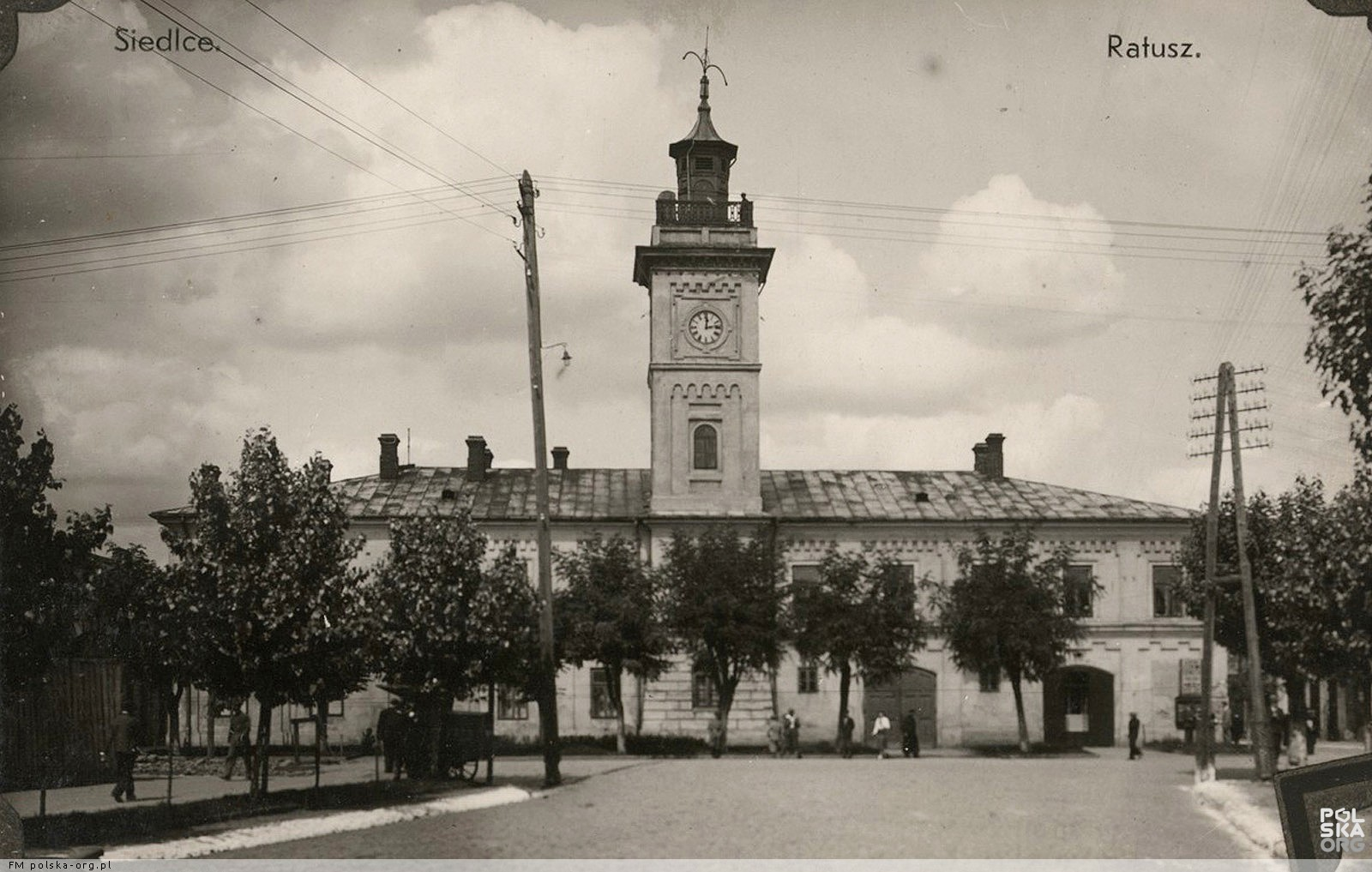
New town hall in 1934, destroyed by Germans in 1939 and never rebuilt

During the invasion of Poland, Germany bombed Polish civilian refugees on the road from Warsaw to Siedlce, and the city was captured and then occupied by Germany until 1944. The Polish government evacuated the Polish gold reserve, part of which was stored in Siedlce, to Polish-allied France. In mid-September 1939, the German Einsatzgruppe V entered the city to commit atrocities against Poles. Siedlce was included within the Warsaw District of the General Government (German-occupied central Poland). During the war, the area of Siedlce was home to a large partisan force of the Home Army and other underground organizations, such as Armia Ludowa. Due to German terror, the town lost one-third of its population, including its entire Jewish community deported to extermination camps during the Holocaust. In 1941, the Germans relocated the Oflag 58 prisoner-of-war camp to Siedlce, which was soon converted into the Stalag 366 POW camp for Polish, Italian, French and Soviet POWs with subcamps in Suchożebry and Biała Podlaska. Approximately 9,000–12,000 POWs died in the Stalag 366 camp. The Stalag 316 POW camp was also based in Siedlce in 1941, before its relocation to Wołkowysk in January 1942. The Polish resistance established a dedicated organization to provide aid to prisoners of war; it supplied them with food, organised collections from the local population, and even introduced deliveries of flour from local millers for this purpose. The resistance also established a secret organization to aid and rescue Jews, edited the local underground newspaper Podlasie and distributed nationwide Polish underground press in Siedlce.

In late July 1944 (see Operation Tempest), Home Army units freed the town, together with the Red Army. After the war, 50% of Siedlce was in ruins, including the town hall.

From 1975 to 1998, the city was the capital of a separate Siedlce Voivodeship.

== Jewish history ==
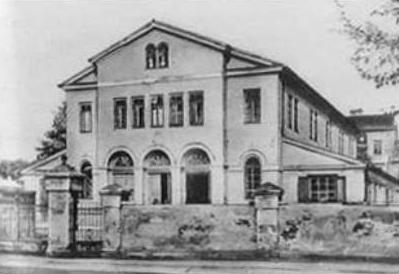
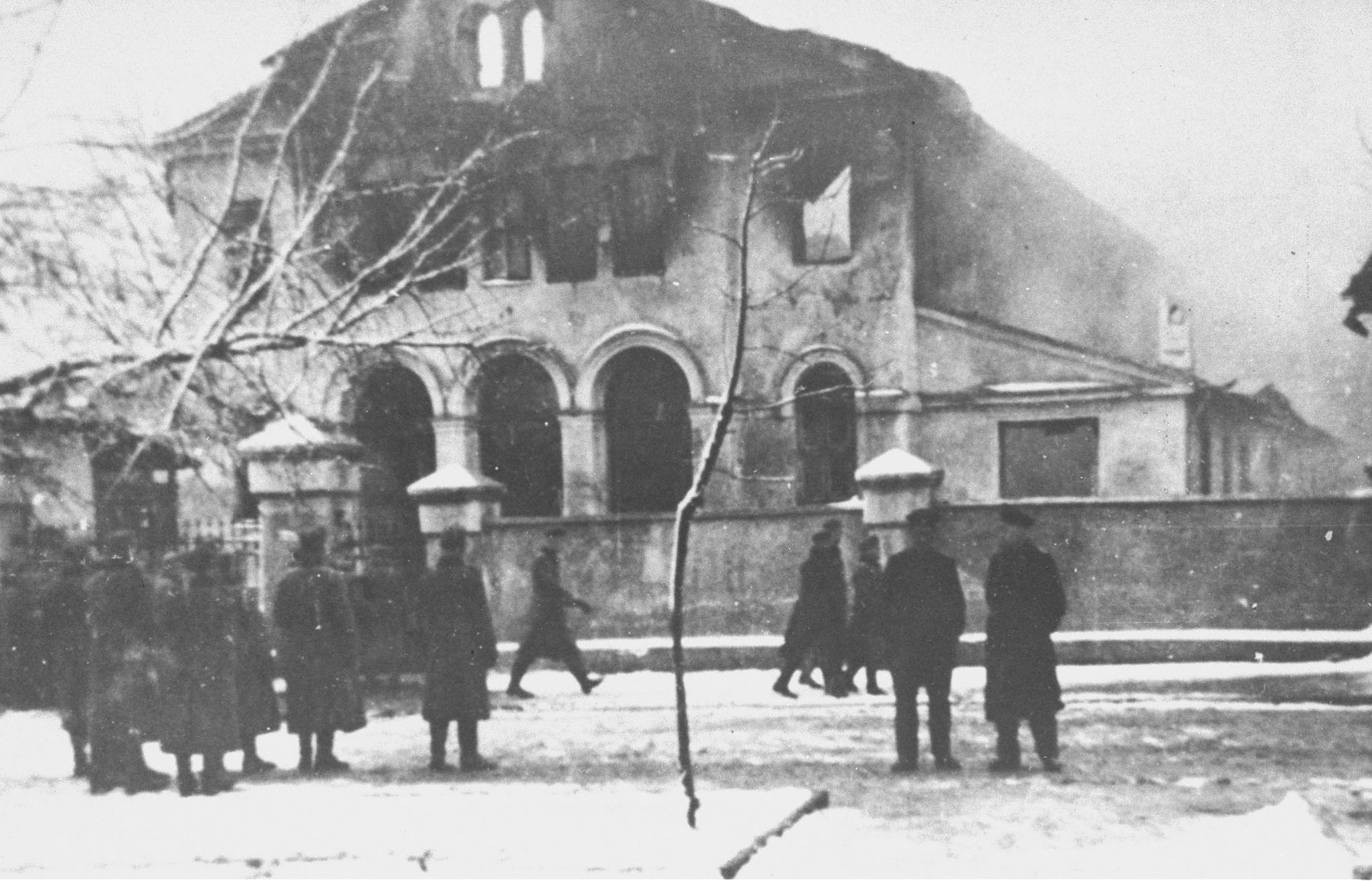
Siedlce Synagogue before and after its destruction by the Germans in December 1939

Until the Holocaust, like many other cities in Europe, Siedlce had a significant Jewish population. At some times, indeed, Jews were the majority of its population. The presence of Jews at Siedlce is attested from the mid-16th century – inn keepers, merchants and artisans. A Jewish hospital existed in the town since the early 18th century. In 1794, a Beit Midrash (study hall) was founded in the town and 1798 the Jewish cemetery was extended, testifying to the increase of the community. These changes coincided with the town coming under Austrian rule with the Third Partition of Poland. Austrian rule lasted until 1809. It was passed to Russian rule in 1815 formally (in 1813 de facto), that lasted for over a hundred years. Until 1819, the Jewish community of Warsaw, 90 kilometres (56 miles) to the west, was formally subject to the authority of the Siedlce rabbis.

As a result of Russian discriminatory policies for much of the 19th century – a time when the town's population steadily increased – Jews were the majority of Siedlce's population: 3,727 (71.5%) in 1839; 4,359 (65%) in 1841; 5,153 (67.5%) in 1858; 8,156 (64%) in 1878. Later on, the percentage of Jews decreased due to non-Jewish migration: according to the Russian census of 1897, out of the total population of 23,700, Jews constituted 11,400 (so around 48% percent). The first Polish census, in 1921, recorded 14,685 Jews living in Siedlce. Their number remained steady in the interwar period, and in 1939, on the eve of the Second World War, there were some 15,000 Jews living in the town.

In the late 19th and early 20th centuries, secular political and cultural activity was evident among Jews in Siedlce, similar to other parts of Central and Eastern Europe. In 1900, the Bund started activity in the town, as did the Zionist movement, and many of the town's Jews were adherents of the Polish Socialist Party. Between 1911 and 1939, two Yiddish weeklies were published in the town, and a Jewish high school was founded during the First World War.

In the last decades of Tsarist rule, many Siedlce activists (both Polish and Jewish) took part in the 1905 Revolution. After a series of attacks on Russians in all of Poland on Bloody Wednesday (15 August 1906) the Russian authorities organized a pogrom in Siedlce in reprisal on 8–10 September 1906, in which 26 Jews perished. In the wake of the First World War the town was affected by the Polish-Soviet War, being occupied by the Red Army in 1920 and taken over by the Polish Army in 1921.

=== World War II ===
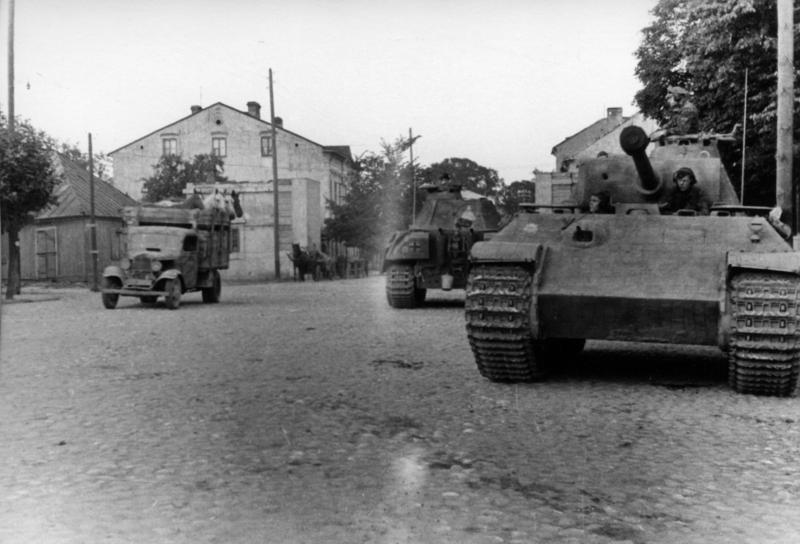
German tanks in Siedlce in 1944

In 1939, Jews constituted some 37% of the town's population. Germans deported over a thousand Jews from elsewhere in Poland to Siedlce in 1940, especially from Łódź, Kalisz and Pabianice. In March 1941, – still before the formal decision to implement the "Final Solution" which meant the wholesale extermination of the Jews – German Order Police battalions rampaged for three days in Siedlce, killing many of its Jewish inhabitants. In August of the same year, the Jews were forced into the new Siedlce Ghetto. It consisted of several small city blocks and over a dozen walkable streets in the city centre. On 1 October 1941, the ghetto was completely cut off from the outside world. In August 1942, some 10,000 Siedlce Jews were deported to Treblinka and murdered there together with a similar number of Jews from three nearby transit ghettos: in Łosice, holding local Jews and families from Huszlew, Olszanka, and Świniarów; in Sarnaki, with Jews from Górki, Kornica, Łysów; and the third transit ghetto with prisoners from Mordy, Krzesk-Królowa Niwa, Przesmyki, Stok Ruski, and Tarków. The town's remaining Jews imprisoned at the "little ghetto" were sent off to extermination on 25 November 1942.

The Polish resistance established a secret organization to aid and rescue Jews.

The Siedlce Jewish community was not restored after the Nazi defeat, and the town's later history lacked the hitherto conspicuous Jewish component. Survivors of the town's population established an association in Israel which in 1956 published a comprehensive memorial book on the community's history. In 1971, Y. Kravitz, one of the survivors, published his memoirs entitled "Five Years of Living Hell under Nazi Rule in the City of Siedlce".

== Climate ==
Siedlce has an oceanic climate (Köppen climate classification: Cfb) using the −3 °C (27 °F) isotherm or a humid continental climate (Köppen climate classification: Dfb) using the 0 °C (32 °F) isotherm.

Climate data for Siedlce (1991–2020 normals, extremes 1951–present)
Month	Jan	Feb	Mar	Apr	May	Jun	Jul	Aug	Sep	Oct	Nov	Dec	Year
Record high °C (°F)	12.0 (53.6)	16.7 (62.1)	22.2 (72.0)	30.1 (86.2)	31.8 (89.2)	33.9 (93.0)	35.5 (95.9)	35.2 (95.4)	33.2 (91.8)	26.0 (78.8)	18.8 (65.8)	14.8 (58.6)	35.5 (95.9)
Mean daily maximum °C (°F)	0.3 (32.5)	1.8 (35.2)	6.8 (44.2)	14.0 (57.2)	19.4 (66.9)	22.6 (72.7)	24.9 (76.8)	24.4 (75.9)	18.7 (65.7)	12.4 (54.3)	6.0 (42.8)	1.6 (34.9)	12.7 (54.9)
Daily mean °C (°F)	−2.2 (28.0)	−1.2 (29.8)	2.5 (36.5)	8.5 (47.3)	13.6 (56.5)	16.9 (62.4)	18.9 (66.0)	18.3 (64.9)	13.3 (55.9)	8.1 (46.6)	3.3 (37.9)	−0.7 (30.7)	8.3 (46.9)
Mean daily minimum °C (°F)	−4.7 (23.5)	−4.1 (24.6)	−1.3 (29.7)	3.2 (37.8)	7.7 (45.9)	11.1 (52.0)	13.1 (55.6)	12.5 (54.5)	8.4 (47.1)	4.4 (39.9)	0.9 (33.6)	−3.1 (26.4)	4.0 (39.2)
Record low °C (°F)	−41.0 (−41.8)	−32.8 (−27.0)	−21.6 (−6.9)	−7.3 (18.9)	−6.0 (21.2)	−0.9 (30.4)	3.9 (39.0)	1.0 (33.8)	−4.2 (24.4)	−9.8 (14.4)	−21.5 (−6.7)	−25.4 (−13.7)	−41.0 (−41.8)
Average precipitation mm (inches)	30.4 (1.20)	26.8 (1.06)	30.9 (1.22)	36.1 (1.42)	61.6 (2.43)	43.9 (1.73)	37.0 (1.46)	39.0 (1.54)	53.8 (2.12)	39.6 (1.56)	33.7 (1.33)	33.4 (1.31)	466.2 (18.35)
Average extreme snow depth cm (inches)	6.7 (2.6)	6.9 (2.7)	5.0 (2.0)	1.5 (0.6)	0.0 (0.0)	0.0 (0.0)	0.0 (0.0)	0.0 (0.0)	0.0 (0.0)	0.5 (0.2)	2.4 (0.9)	4.4 (1.7)	6.9 (2.7)
Average precipitation days (≥ 0.1 mm)	15.23	14.04	12.97	11.33	12.87	13.27	13.10	11.47	11.87	12.27	14.27	15.10	157.77
Average snowy days (≥ 0 cm)	17.0	15.8	8.2	1.0	0.0	0.0	0.0	0.0	0.0	0.5	4.8	12.3	59.6
Average relative humidity (%)	87.4	84.4	77.1	69.9	71.7	73.7	73.8	74.0	80.6	84.0	88.7	89.2	79.5
Mean monthly sunshine hours	46.3	68.0	131.2	195.6	260.8	264.2	269.0	257.0	172.7	114.8	50.6	34.6	1,864.9
Source 1: Institute of Meteorology and Water Management
Source 2: Meteomodel.pl (records, relative humidity 1991–2020)

== Transport ==
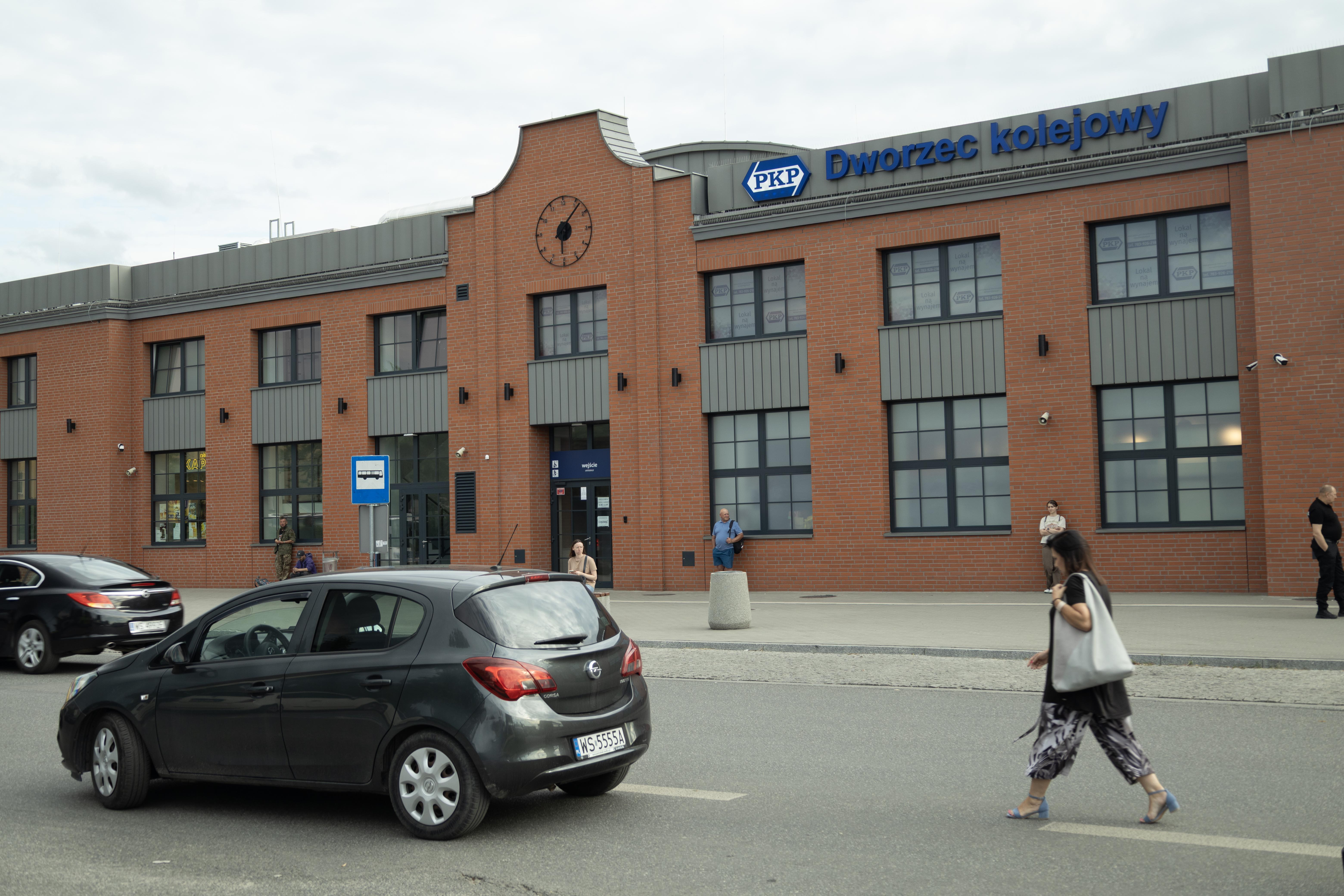
Siedlce railway station

Siedlce lies next to the A2 motorway (E30) which bypasses it to the south Three exits (39, 40 and 41) of the A2 motorway serve the town. The A2 provides quicker access to Warsaw and to the rest of Poland.

National Roads 92 and 63 also pass through Siedlce.

The city has three railway station, the main Siedlce railway station, and the Siedlce Zachodnie (West) and Siedlce Wschodnie (East) stations. PKP Intercity trains and Koleje Mazowieckie (KM) operate frequent services to Warsaw. Regional trains link Siedlce to smaller towns such as Łuków, Biała Podlaska and Terespol.

== Points of interest ==
Among the historic architecture of the city are:

- Ogiński Palace complex with the Aleksandria Park, the Holy Cross Chapel (Ogiński Chapel) and the present-day State Archive
- Old town hall
- Siedlce Cathedral
- St. Stanislaus Church
- Polish Post Office (Neoclassical)
- former guardhouse (Neoclassical), now housing a public library
- Neoclassical building of the former theater, now the Siedlce Registry Office
- Neoclassical building of the National Bank of Poland (architect: Marian Lalewicz)
- District Court
- Resursa Obywatelska
- Preserved old townhouses

Never rebuilt after World War II:

- Synagogue
- New town hall
- Ogińska Gate

Other points of interest:

- Siedlce shopping mall
- Muchawka lagoon
- Władysław Sikorski square
- Tadeusz Kościuszko square
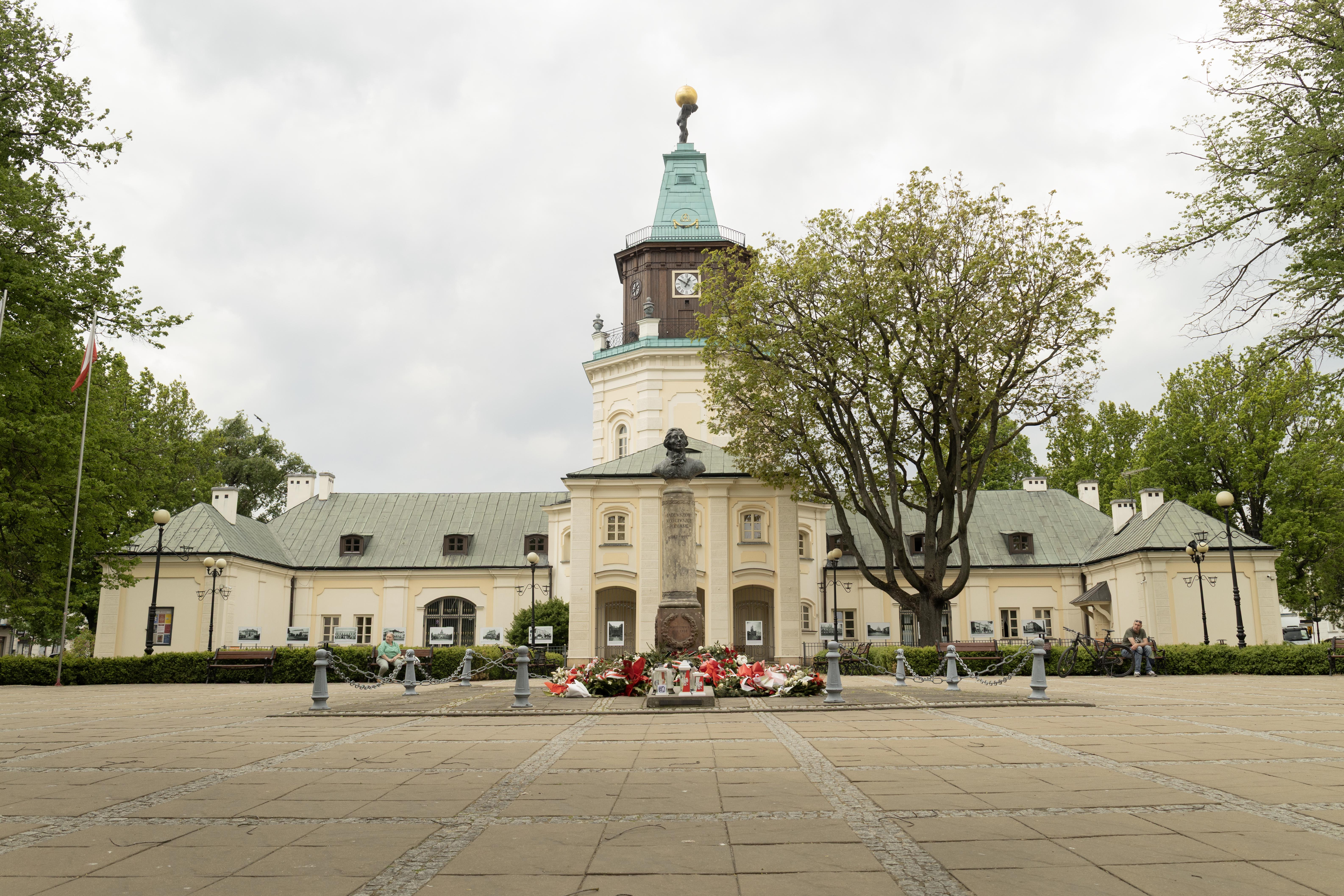
Old town hall and Kościuszko Monument

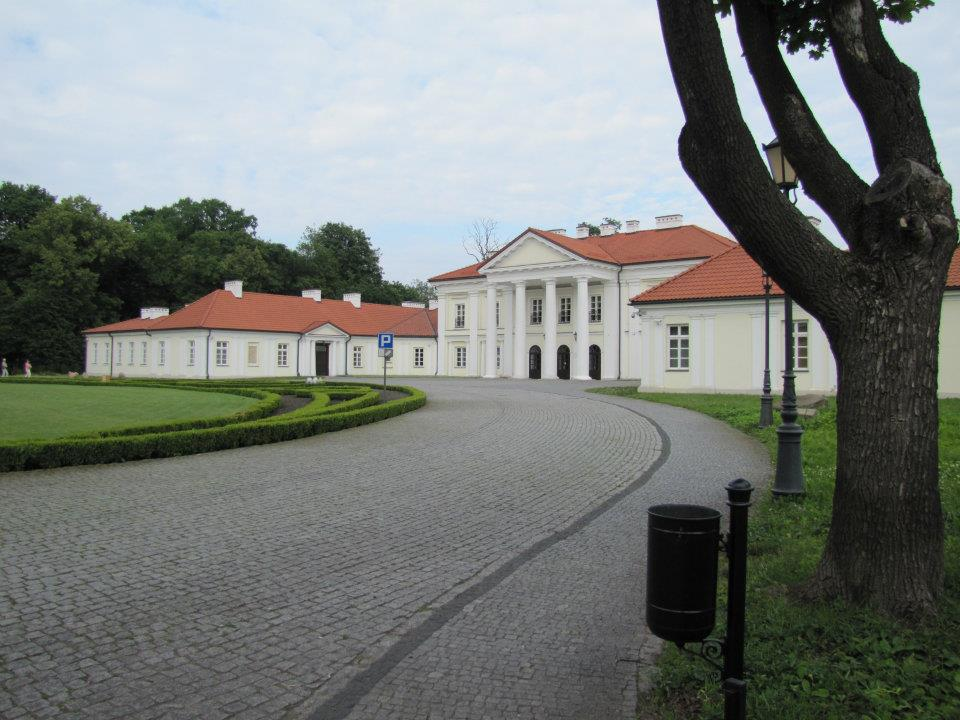
Ogiński Palace

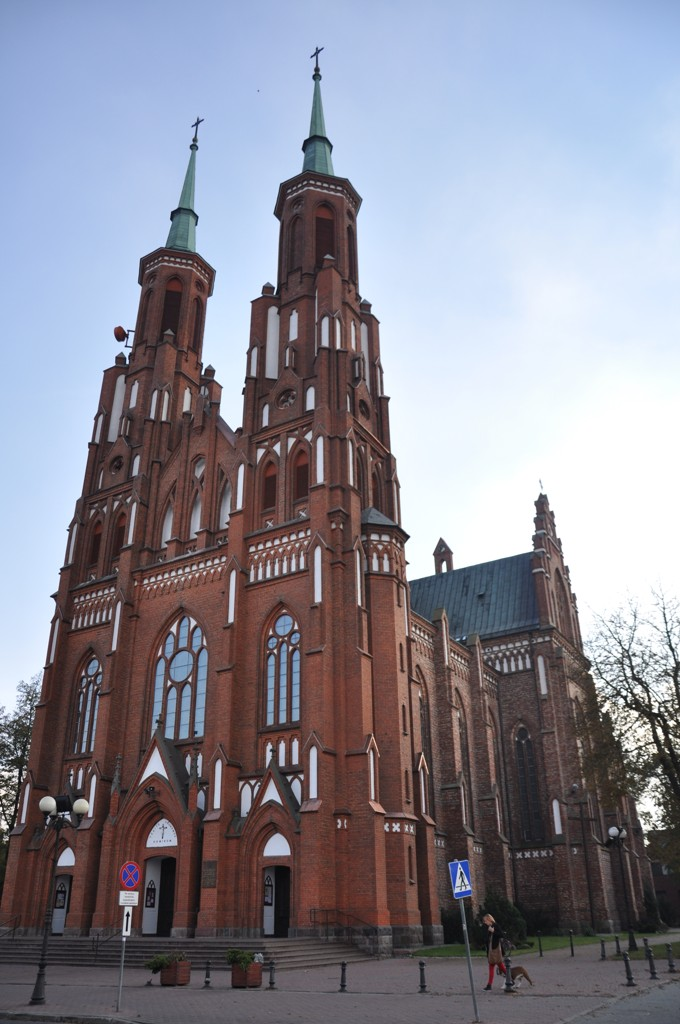
Siedlce Cathedral

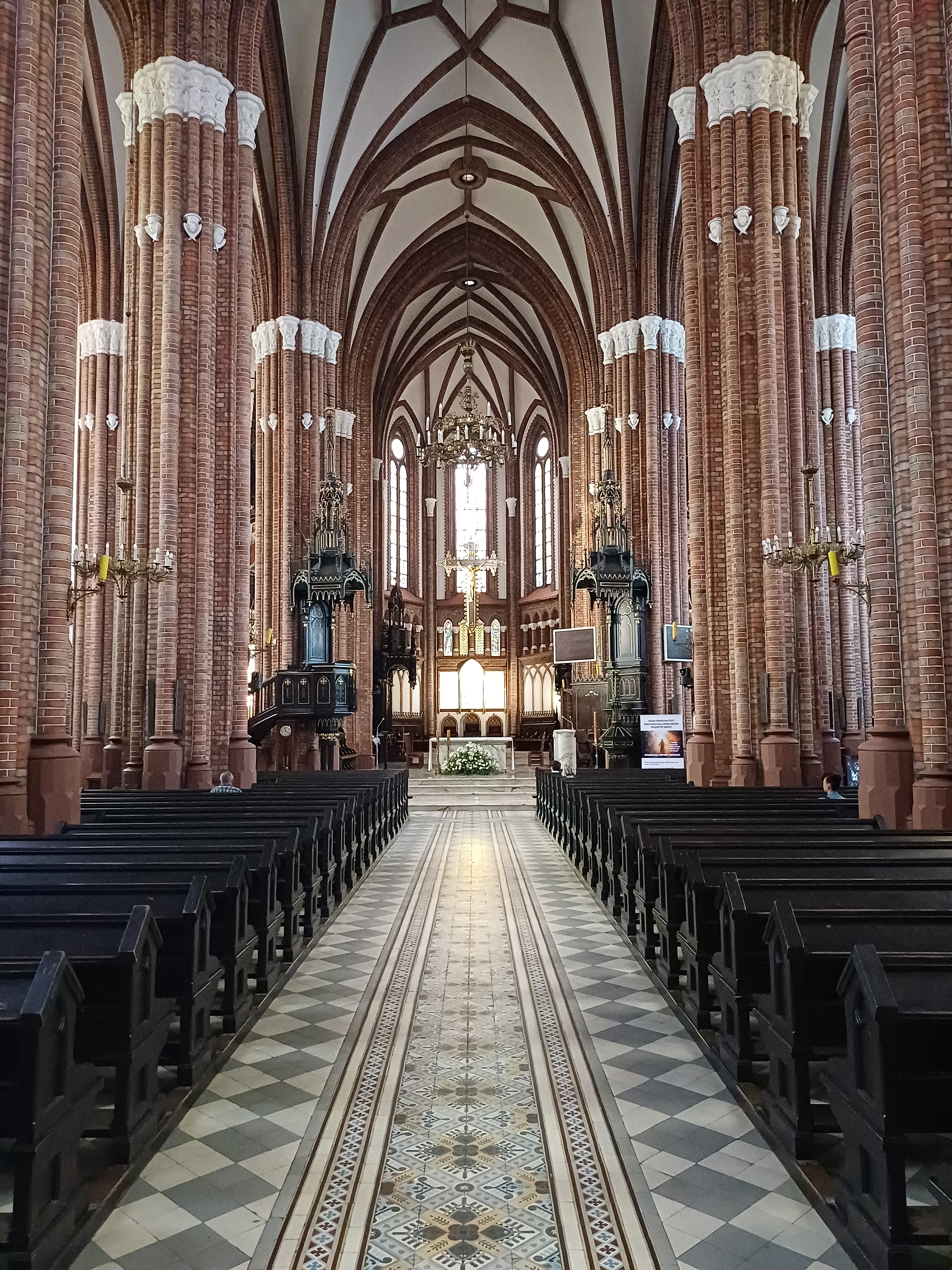
Cathedral interior

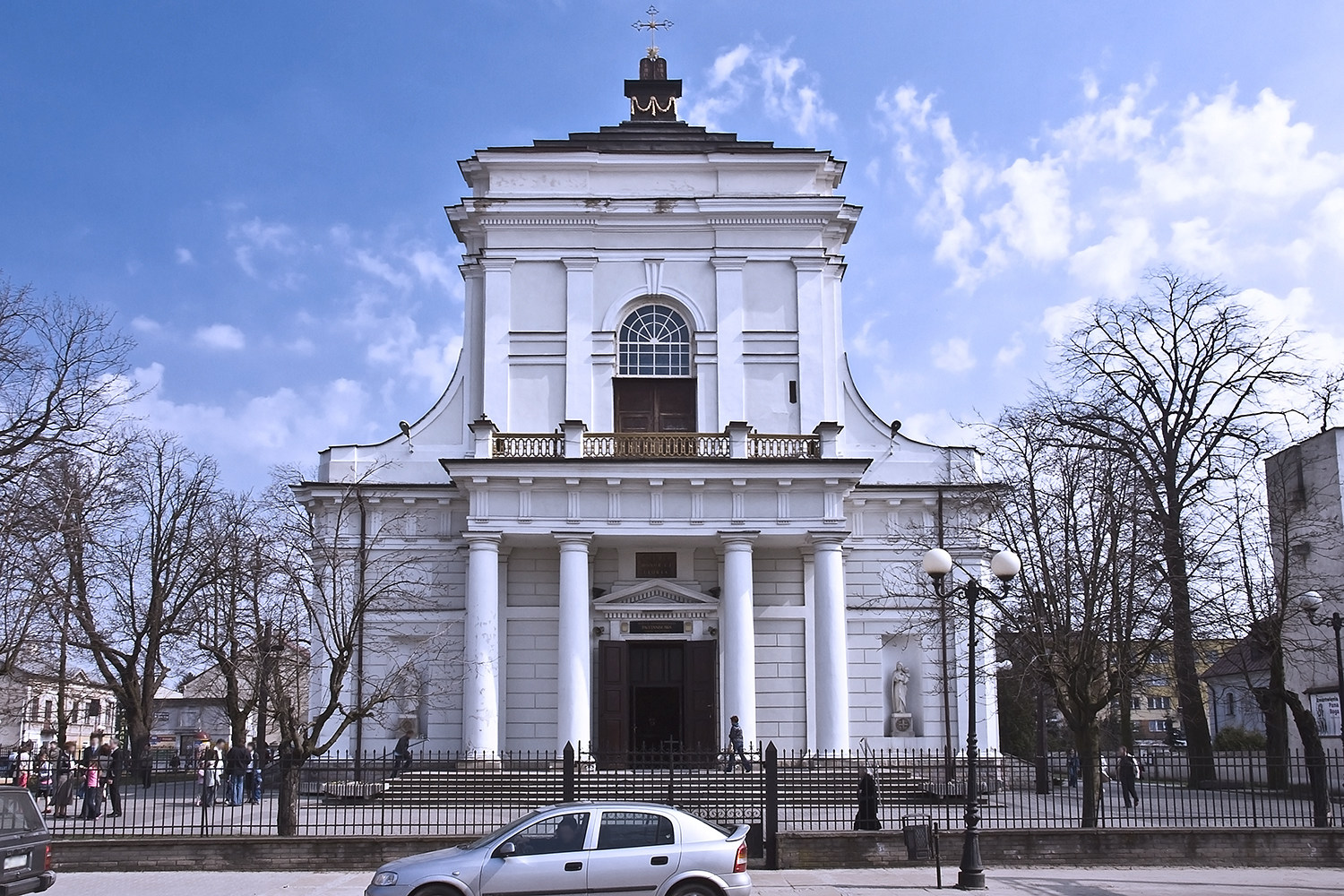
St. Stanislaus Church

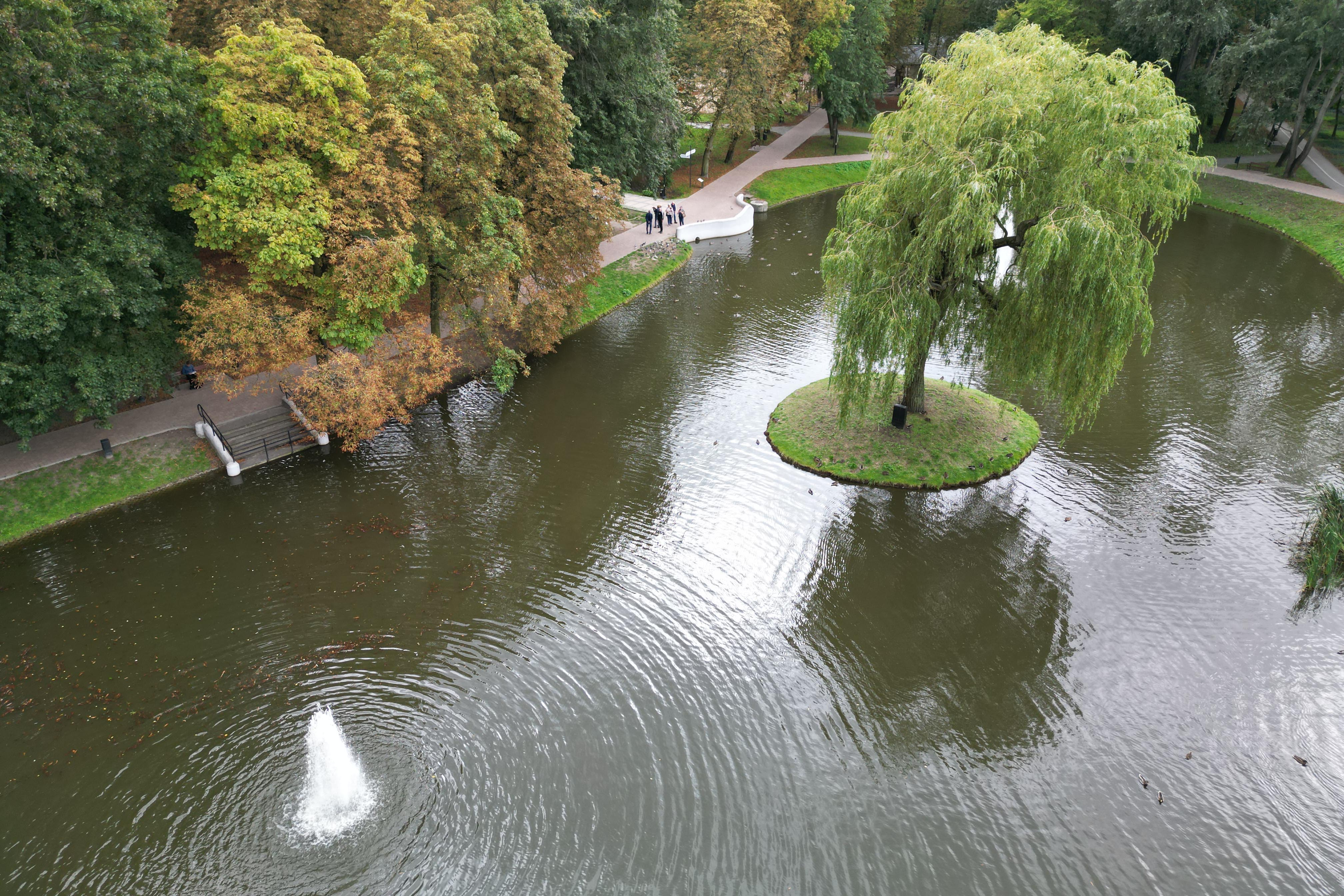
Aleksandria Park

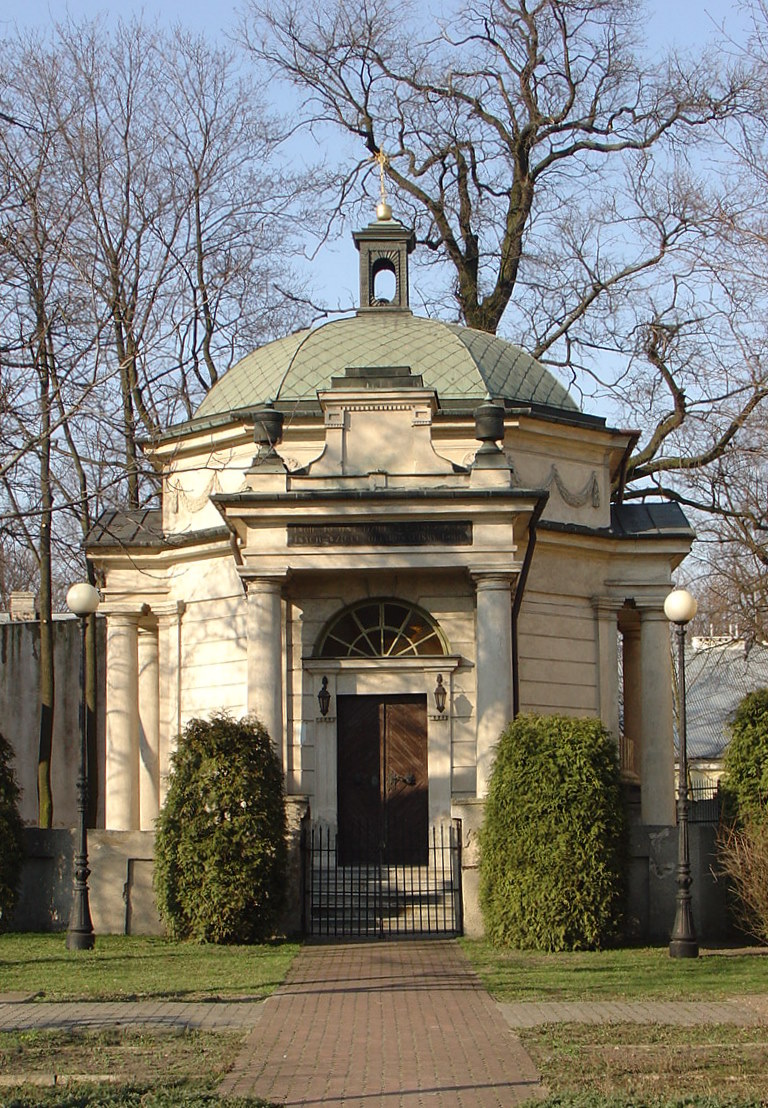
Holy Cross Chapel

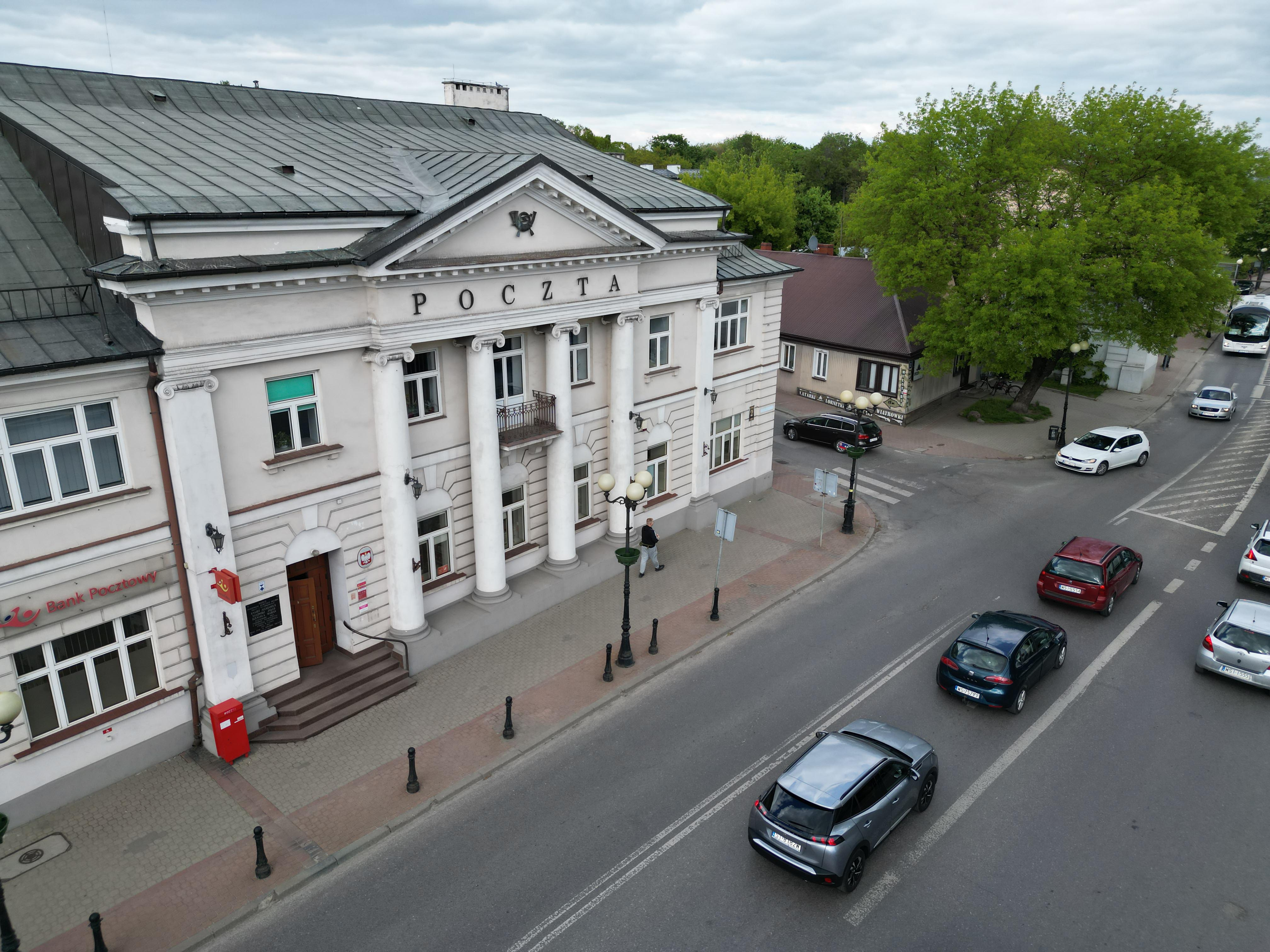
Polish Post Office

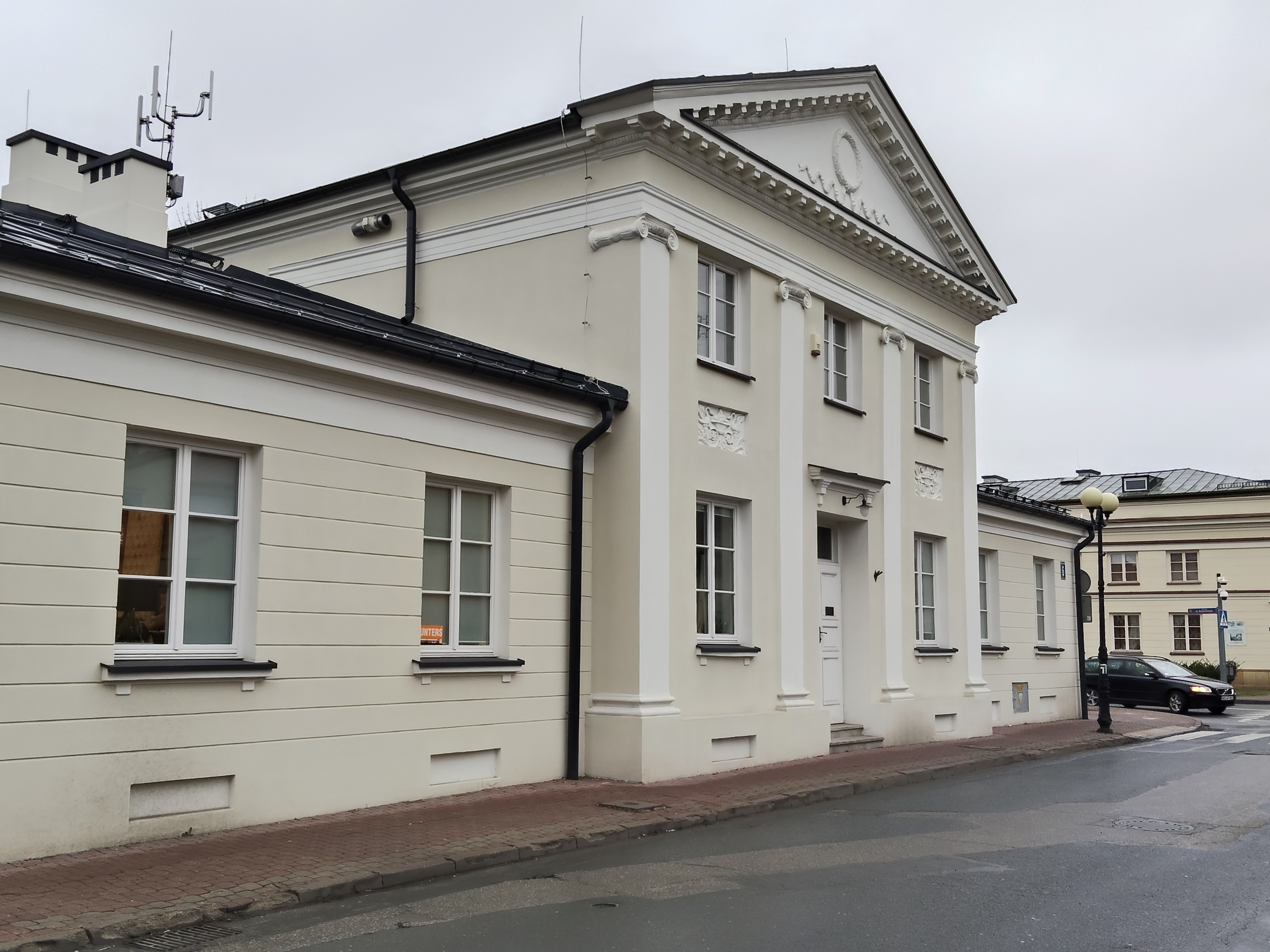
Siedlce Registry Office

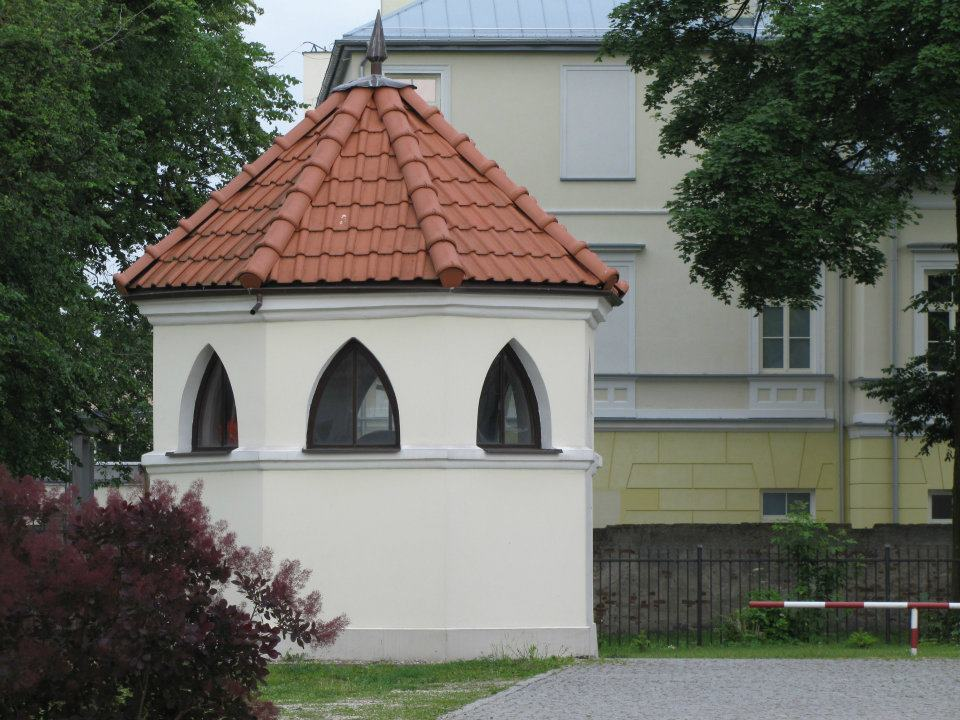
Historic well

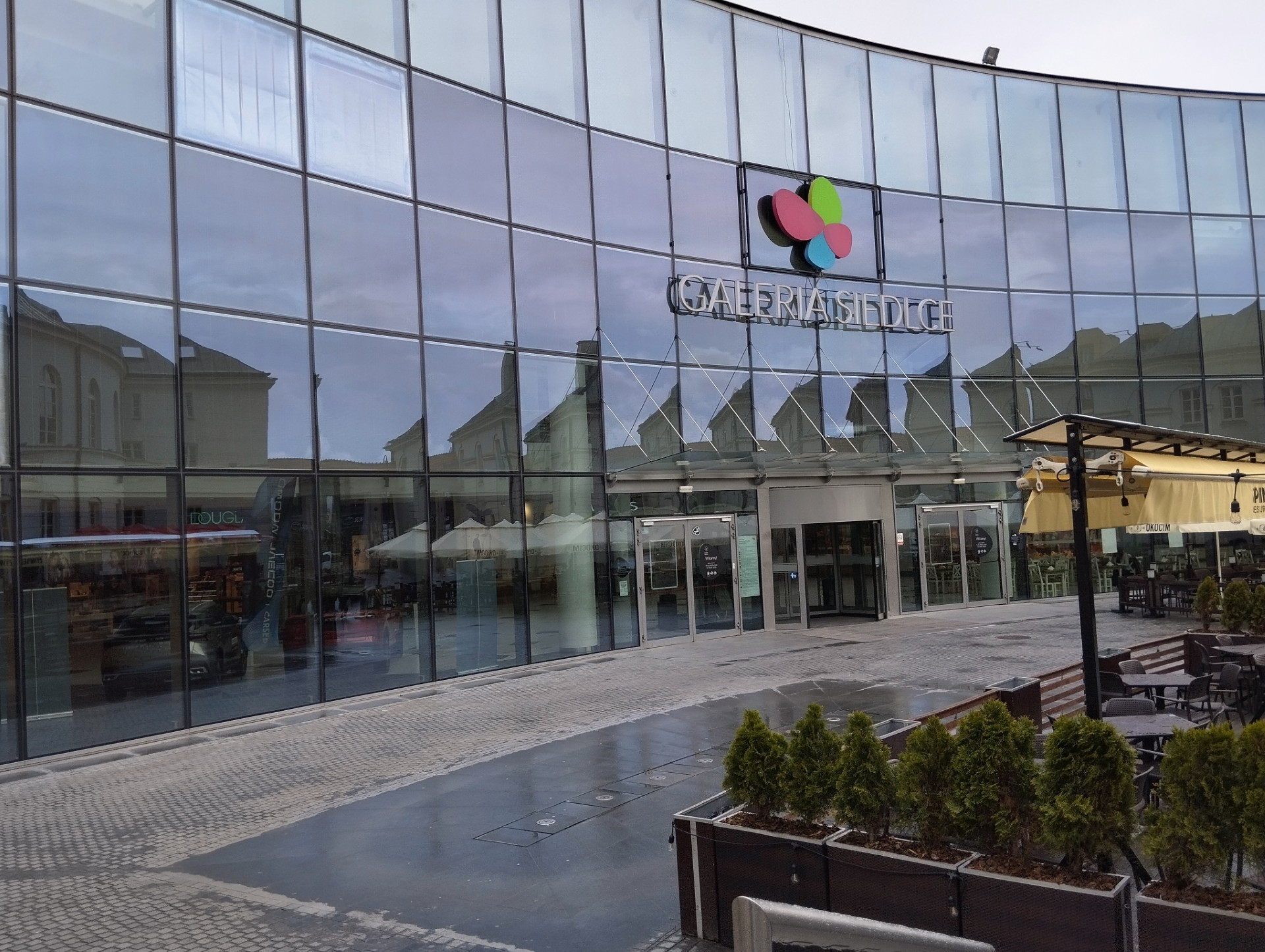
Siedlce shopping mall

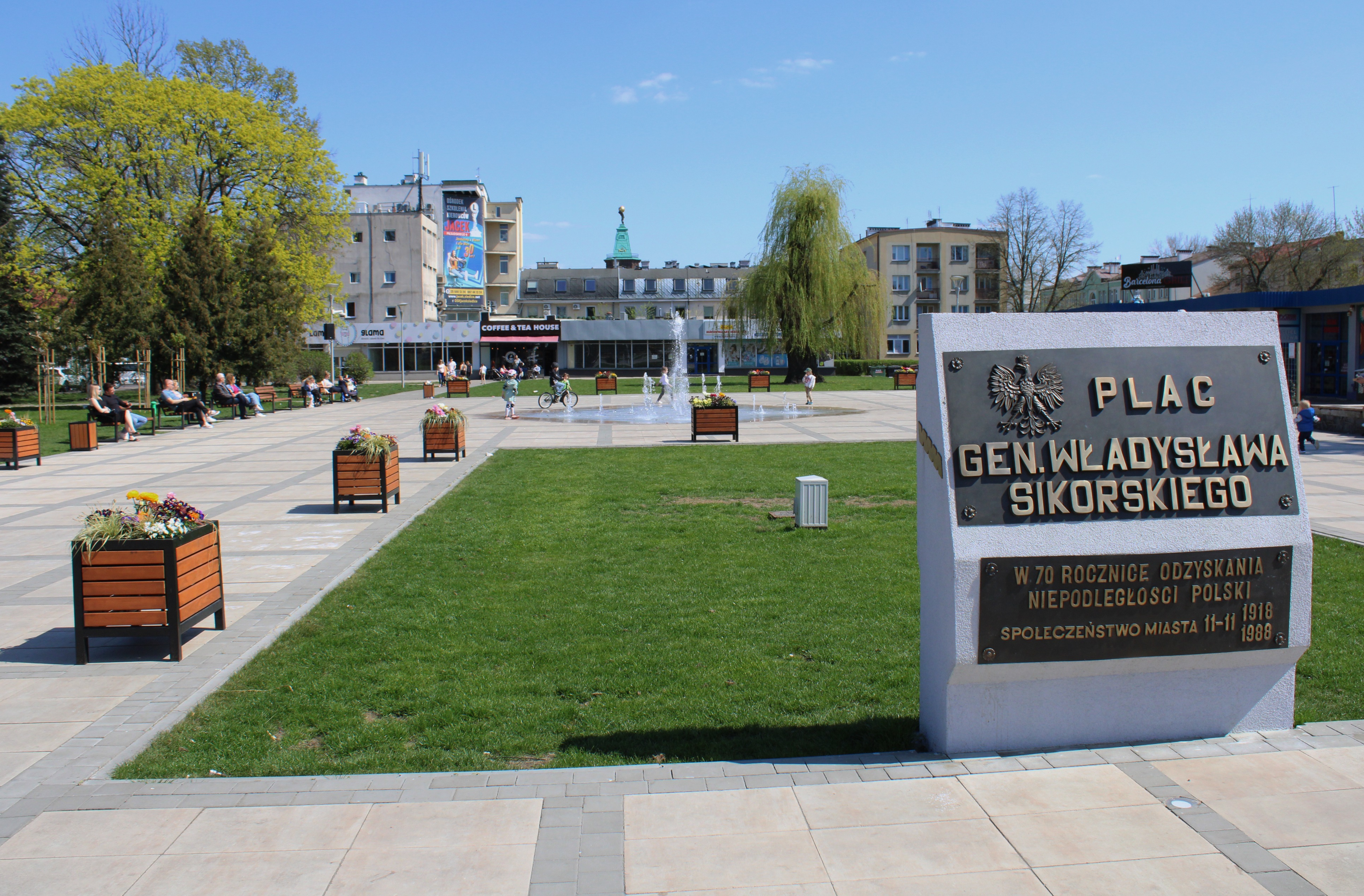
Władysław Sikorski square

== Culture ==
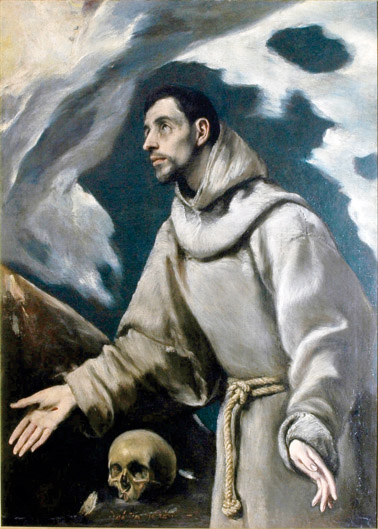
Ecstasy of St. Francis of Assisi, (ca.1580) by El Greco on display in the Diocesan Museum in Siedlce

The city is a cultural hub for the entire province, with festivals, exhibitions, and concerts of country-wide significance. The town has three museums and three public libraries. The principal animators of culture operating in the city are the Culture and Art Center (CKiS) and the Municipal Cultural Centre (MOK). There are two movie theatres; the art-house cinema run by the CKiS, and the multiscreen cinema Novekino network. A number of artistic groups operate in the city, including the dance companies LUZ and Caro Dance, the Choir of the City of Siedlce, and the ES Theatre. The city also has an art gallery located at the university. A painting by El Greco, "The Ecstasy of St. Francis", is preserved there. It is the only El Greco painting in Poland.

Among the media outlets which operate in this area are the local television (TV Siedlce) and the Catholic radio station Radio Podlasie. Siedlce is the location of the regional headquarters of the TVP Warsaw/TVP Info, RDC (Radio For You) and Radio Eska.

Siedlce serves as the location of The Office PL, the Polish adaptation of The Office.

== Sport ==
The city's most popular sports clubs are:

- MKP Pogoń Siedlce – football club, currently playing in the second division
- MKS Pogoń Siedlce – rugby club, playing in the Rugby Ekstraliga, two times Polish Champions (2024−25, 2025−26)
- WKS 22 pp Siedlce – defunct football club, which played in the top division in the 1930s

== Education ==
=== Higher learning ===
Rector's office and main library of the Siedlce University
- Uniwersytet w Siedlcach (University in Siedlce)
- Collegium Mazovia Innowacyjna Szkoła Wyższa (Collegium Mazovia Innovative Higher School)
- Wyższe Seminarium Duchowne Diecezji Siedleckiej (Seminary of the Diocese of Siedlce)
- Instytut Teologiczny w Siedlcach (Institute of Theology in Siedlce)

=== Notable secondary schools ===
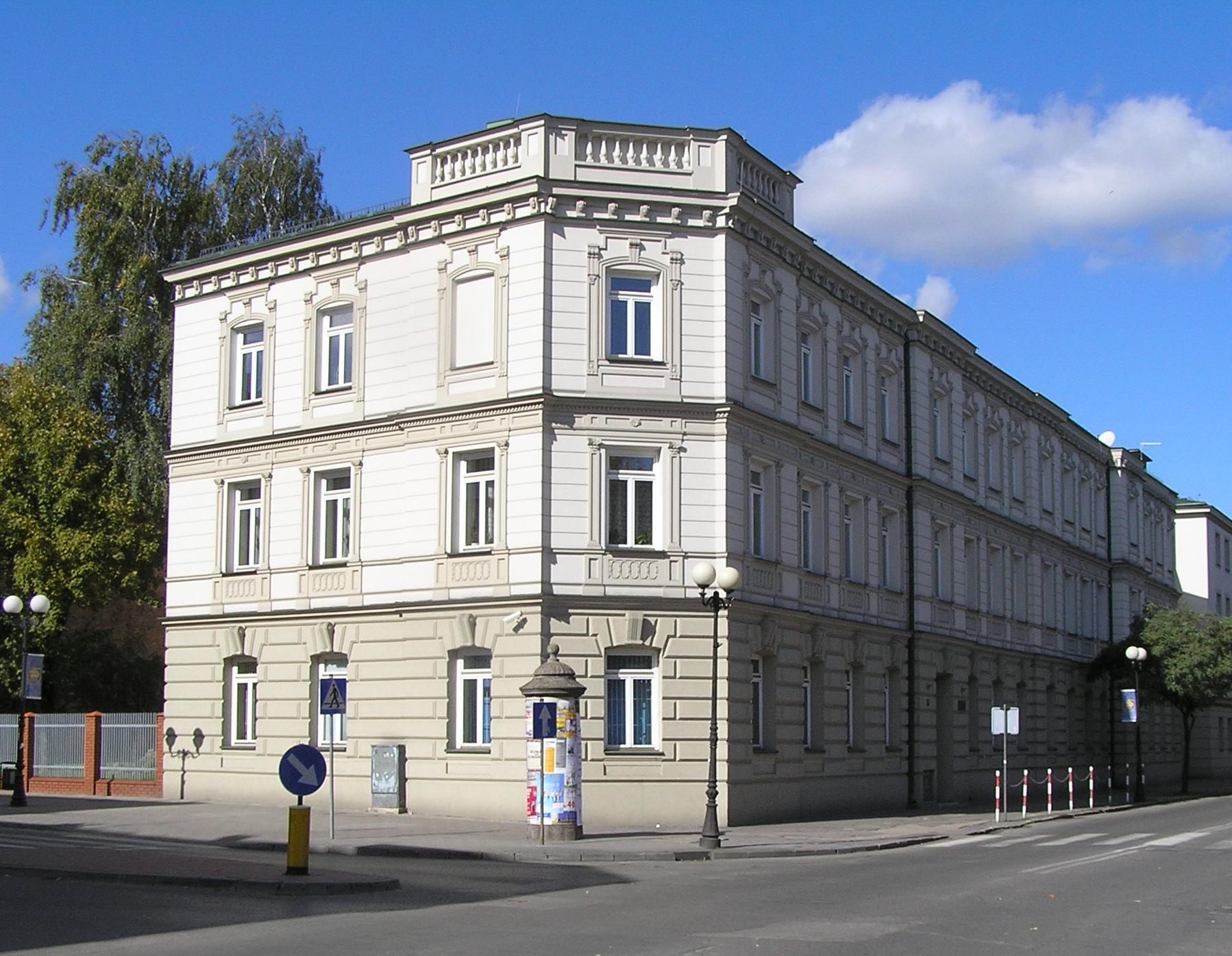
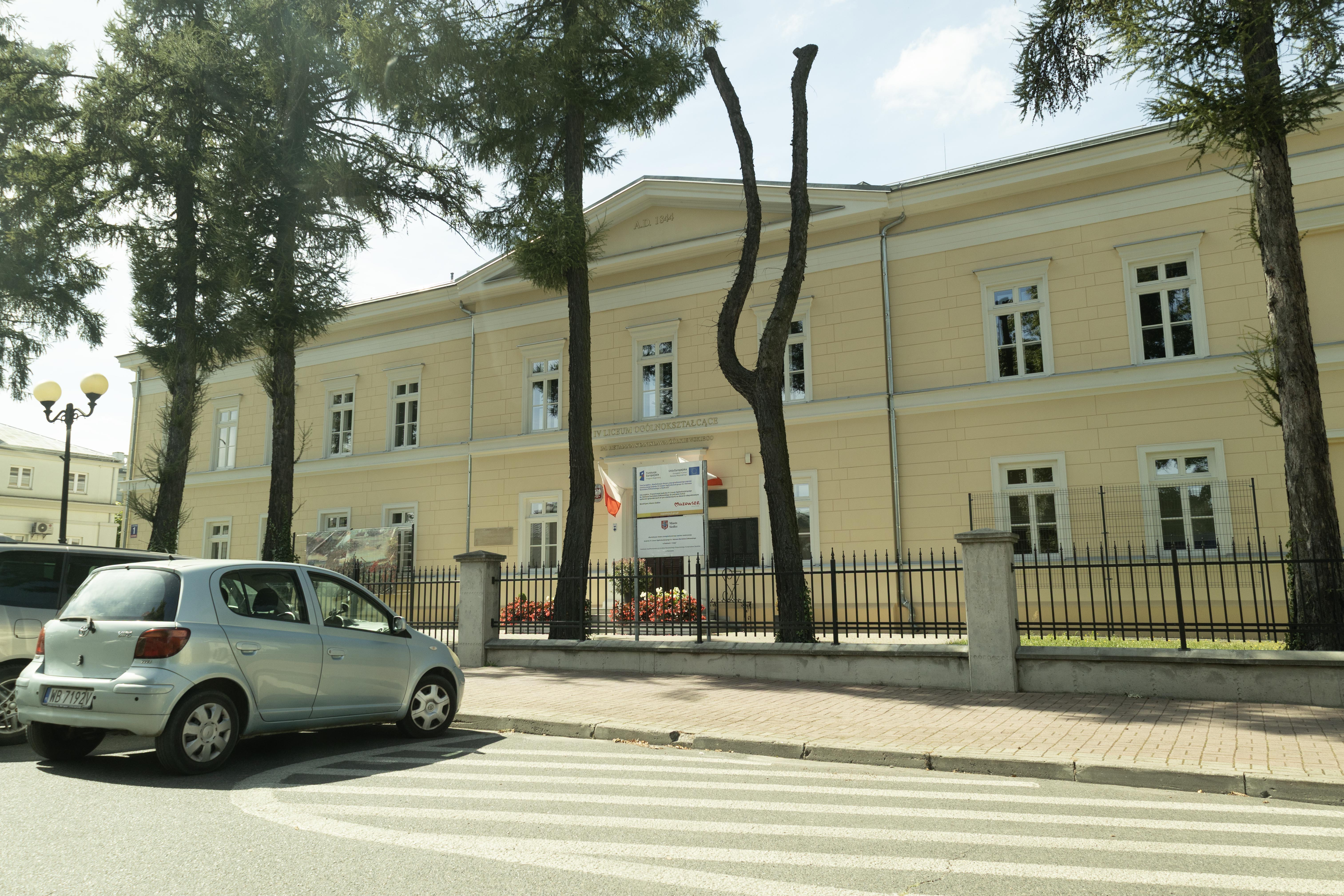
General education liceums No. 1 and 4
- I LO im. Bolesława Prusa (Bolesław Prus High School)
- II LO im. Św. Królowej Jadwigi (St. Queen Jadwiga High School)
- I Katolickie Liceum Ogólnokształcące im. Świętej Rodziny (Holy Family Catholic High School)
- IV LO im. Hetmana Stanisława Żółkiewskiego (Hetman Stanisław Żółkiewski High School)
- Zespół Szkół Ponadpodstawowych nr 1 im. Stanisława Staszica (First Stanisław Staszic High School Complex)
- Zespół Szkół Ponadpodstawowych nr 3 im. Stanisława Staszica (Second Stanisław Staszic High School Complex)
- Zespół Szkół Ponadpodstawowych nr 5 im. Władysława Sikorskiego (Władysław Sikorski High School Complex)

== International relations ==
=== Twin towns — Sister cities ===
Siedlce is twinned with:

Berdychiv, Ukraine; Dasing, Germany; Pescantina, Italy; Sabinov, Slovakia	Vawkavysk, Belarus; Vilnius Region, Lithuania; Nevers, France

== Notable people ==
- Bohdan Arct (1914–1973), fighter pilot, writer
- Artur Boruc (born 1980), a football goalkeeper
- Richard Burgin (1892–1981), Jewish composer who attended St. Petersburg Conservatory and became the concert master for the Boston Symphony Orchestra
- Vladimir Chelomei (1914–1984), Soviet Academician and scientist in the field of mechanics and control processes; designer of missiles, spacecraft, and space stations; founder and the General Constructor of OKB-52 (now NPO Mashinostroyenia).
- Lidia Chojecka (born 1977), Polish middle-distance runner who specializes in the 1500 metres and sometimes 3000 metres
- Aleksander Fogiel (1910–1996), theatre and film actor, director, theatre director and designer
- Izrael Hieger (1901–1986), biochemist
- Aleksandra Klejnowska (born 1982), weightlifter
- Jacob Stodolsky, Yiddish poet and editor, member of the Introspectivist Literary group in early 20th century
- Przemysław Truściński (born 1972), artist
- Louis Waller (1935–2019), Australian law professor
- Agata Wróbel (born 1981), weightlifter, 2000 Summer Olympics silver medallist
- Maciej Rosołek (born 2001), footballer
- Anatol Joukowsky (1905/1906–1998), ballet dancer, choreographer, teacher

== See also ==
- Gdańsk-Siedlce – one of the districts of the city of Gdańsk.
