= Gmina Przesmyki =

Gmina Przesmyki Przesmyki Commune
- Gmina
- Interactive map of Gmina Przesmyki
- Coordinates (Przesmyki): 52°16′N 22°35′E
- Country: Poland
- Voivodeship: Masovian
- County: Siedlce County
- Seat: Przesmyki

Area
  - Total: 117.13 km^{2} (45.22 sq mi)

Population (2014)
  - Total: 3,414
  - Density: 29.15/km^{2} (75.49/sq mi)

Gmina Przesmyki is a rural gmina (administrative district) in Siedlce County, Masovian Voivodeship, in east-central Poland. Its seat is the village of Przesmyki, which lies approximately 25 kilometres (16 mi) north-east of Siedlce and 109 km (68 mi) east of Warsaw.

The gmina covers an area of 117.13 square kilometres (45.2 sq mi), and as of 2006 its total population is 3,694 (3,414 in 2014).

== Villages ==
Gmina Przesmyki contains the villages and settlements of Cierpigórz, Dąbrowa, Głuchówek, Górki, Kaliski, Kamianki Lackie, Kamianki-Czabaje, Kamianki-Nicki, Kamianki-Wańki, Kolonia Łysowa, Kukawki, Lipiny, Łysów, Pniewiski, Podraczynie, Przesmyki, Raczyny, Stare Rzewuski, Tarków, Tarkówek, Wólka Łysowska, Zaborów, Zalesie and Zawady.

== Neighbouring gminas ==
Gmina Przesmyki is bordered by the gminas of Korczew, Łosice, Mordy, Paprotnia and Platerów.
