= Kobierski =

Kobierski (feminine Kobierska) is a Polish surname. Notable people with the surname include:

- Janusz Adam Kobierski (born 1947), Polish priest and poet
- Marcin Kobierski (born 1977), Polish canoer
- Stanislaus Kobierski (1910–1972), German footballer

== See also ==
- Koberskiy
