= Zawady, Gmina Przesmyki =

Zawady
- Village
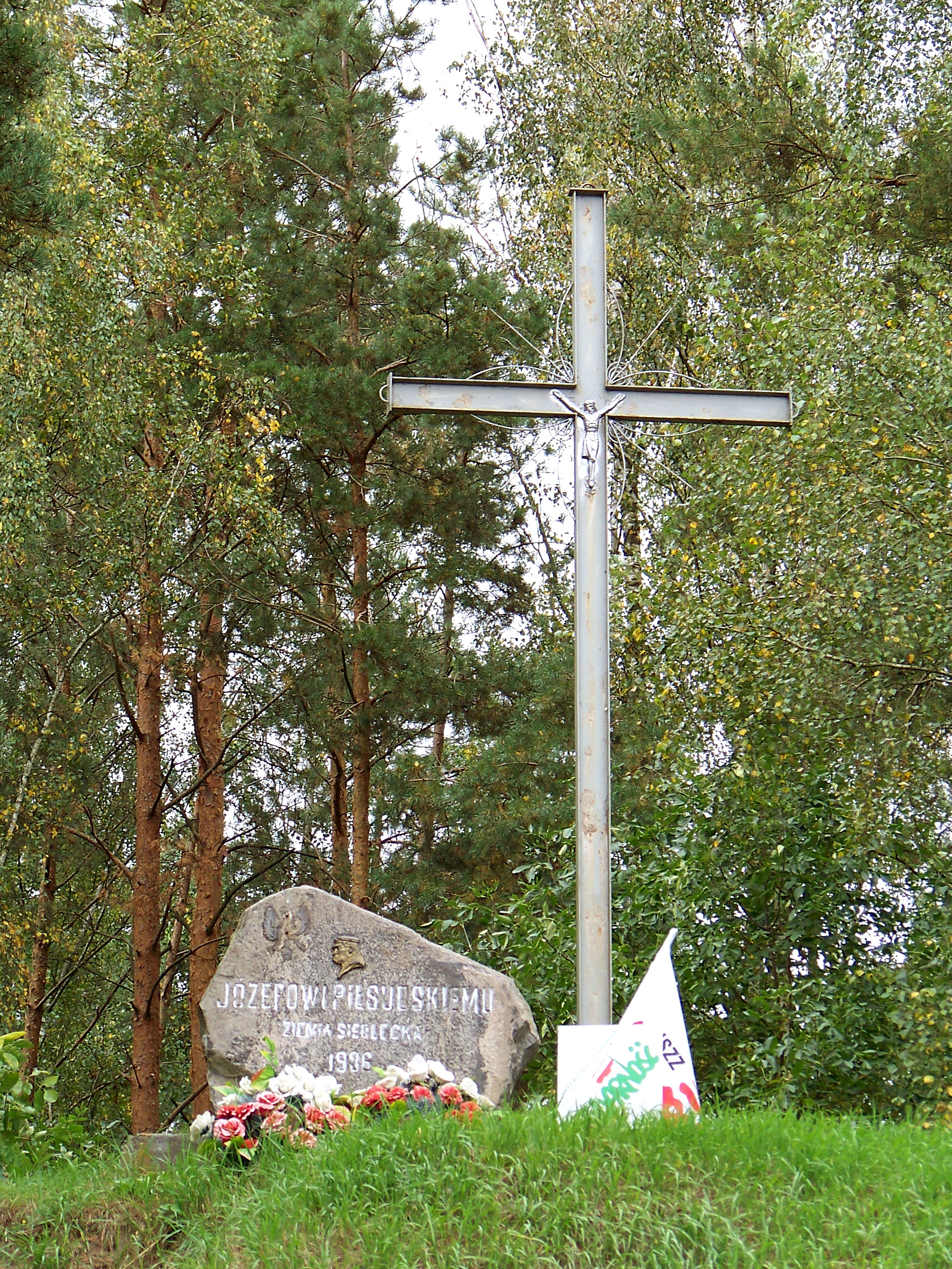

- Location within Poland
- Coordinates: 52°13′42″N 22°37′00″E
- Country: Poland
- Voivodeship: Masovian
- County: Siedlce
- Gmina: Przesmyki

Zawady [zaˈvadɨ] is a village in the administrative district of Gmina Przesmyki, within Siedlce County, Masovian Voivodeship, in east-central Poland.
