= Tarkówek =

- Village
- Location within Poland
- Coordinates: 52°16′16″N 22°32′15″E
- Country: Poland
- Voivodeship: Masovian
- County: Siedlce
- Gmina: Przesmyki

Tarkówek [tarˈkuvɛk] is a village in the administrative district of Gmina Przesmyki, within Siedlce County, Masovian Voivodeship, in east-central Poland. The town was administratively part of the Siedlce province .
