= Kamianki-Czabaje =

- Village
- Location within Poland
- Coordinates: 52°18′59″N 22°35′33″E
- Country: Poland
- Voivodeship: Masovian
- County: Siedlce
- Gmina: Przesmyki
- Population: 200

Kamianki-Czabaje [kaˈmjanki t͡ʂaˈbajɛ] is a village in the administrative district of Gmina Przesmyki, within Siedlce County, Masovian Voivodeship, in east-central Poland.
