= Kaliski, Gmina Przesmyki =

Kaliski
- Village
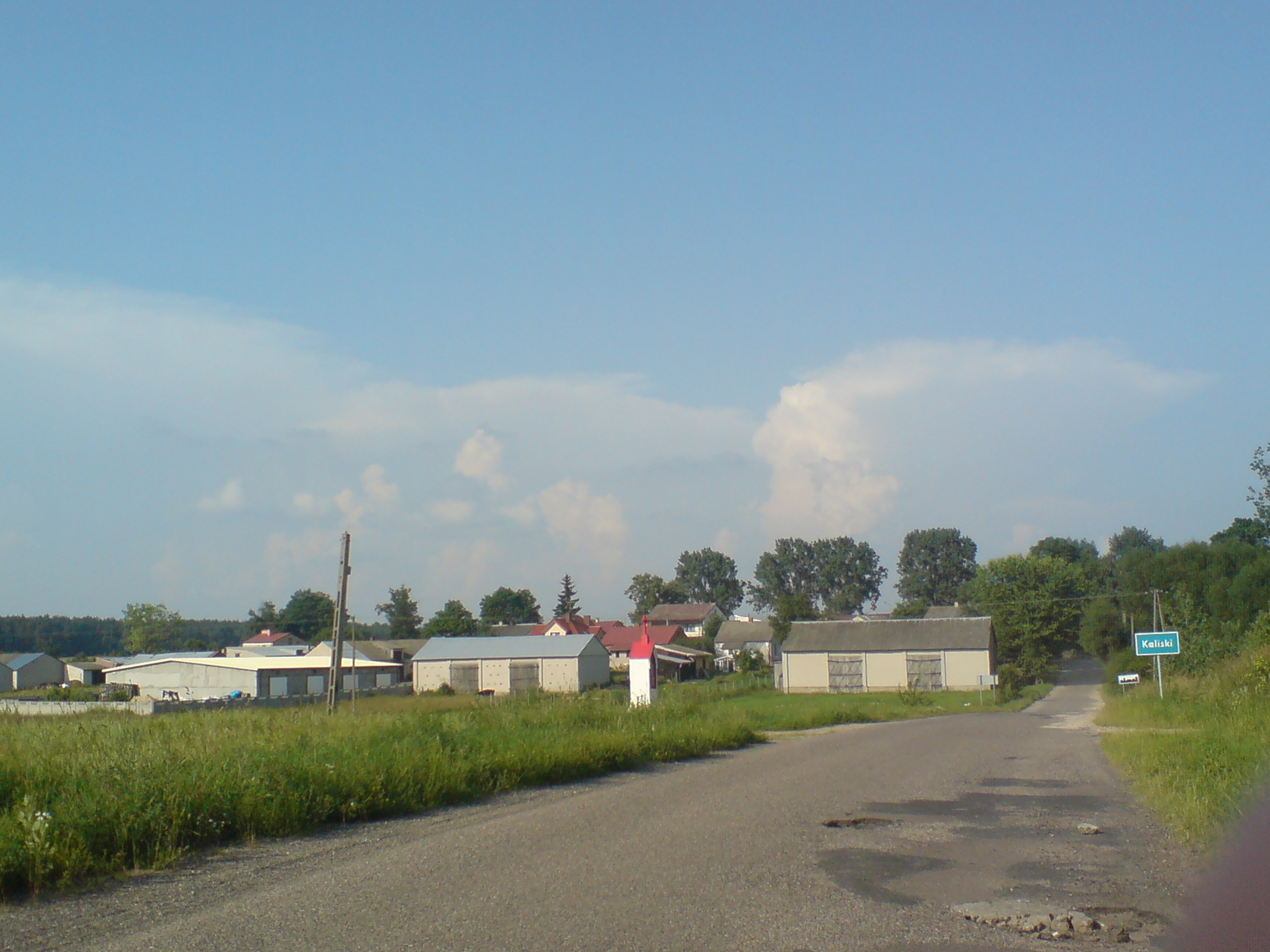

- Location within Poland
- Coordinates: 52°16′41″N 22°36′8″E
- Country: Poland
- Voivodeship: Masovian
- County: Siedlce
- Gmina: Przesmyki

Kaliski [kaˈliski] is a village in the administrative district of Gmina Przesmyki, within Siedlce County, Masovian Voivodeship, in east-central Poland.
