= Stare Rzewuski =

- Village
- Location within Poland
- Coordinates: 52°15′42″N 22°37′06″E
- Country: Poland
- Voivodeship: Masovian
- County: Siedlce
- Gmina: Przesmyki

Stare Rzewuski [ˈstarɛ ʐɛˈvuski] is a large village in the administrative district of Gmina Przesmyki, within Siedlce County, Masovian Voivodeship, in east-central Poland.
