= Kamianki-Wańki =

Village in Gmina Przesmyki, Poland

- Village
- Location within Poland
- Coordinates: 52°17′45″N 22°34′56″E
- Country: Poland
- Voivodeship: Masovian
- County: Siedlce
- Gmina: Przesmyki

Kamianki-Wańki [kaˈmjanki ˈvaɲki] is a village in the administrative district of Gmina Przesmyki, within Siedlce County, Masovian Voivodeship, in east-central Poland.
