= Cierpigórz, Siedlce County =

Cierpigórz
- Village
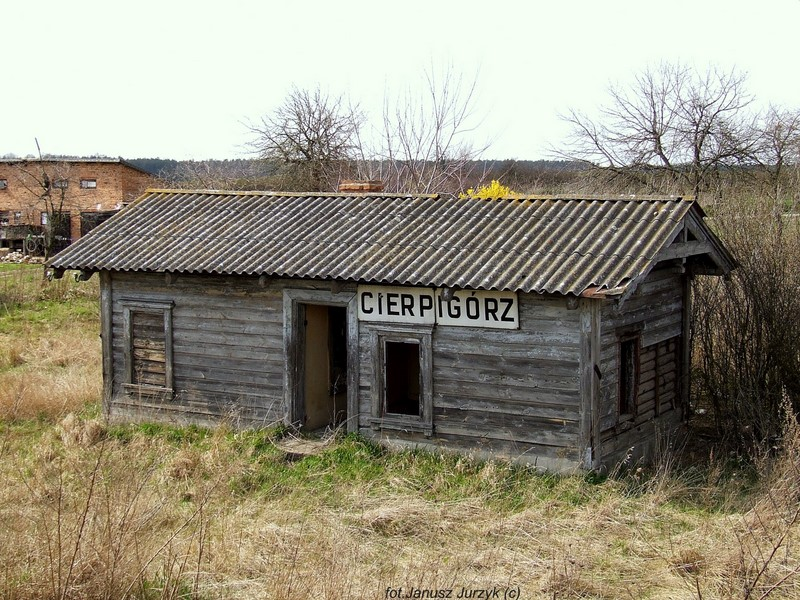

- Location within Poland
- Coordinates: 52°14′N 22°36′E
- Country: Poland
- Voivodeship: Masovian
- County: Siedlce
- Gmina: Przesmyki

Cierpigórz [t͡ɕɛrˈpiɡuʂ] is a village in the administrative district of Gmina Przesmyki, within Siedlce County, Masovian Voivodeship, in east-central Poland.
