= Głuchówek, Masovian Voivodeship =

Głuchówek
- Village
- Location within Poland
- Coordinates: 52°14′N 22°32′E
- Country: Poland
- Voivodeship: Masovian
- County: Siedlce
- Gmina: Przesmyki
- Population (approx.): 200

Głuchówek [ɡwuˈxuvɛk] is a village in the administrative district of Gmina Przesmyki, within Siedlce County, Masovian Voivodeship, in east-central Poland.
