= Pniewiski =

- Village
- Location within Poland
- Coordinates: 52°18′N 22°33′E
- Country: Poland
- Voivodeship: Masovian
- County: Siedlce
- Gmina: Przesmyki

Pniewiski [pɲɛˈviski] is a village in the administrative district of Gmina Przesmyki, within Siedlce County, Masovian Voivodeship, in east-central Poland.
