= Janusz Adam Kobierski =

Polish poet and priest (born 1947)

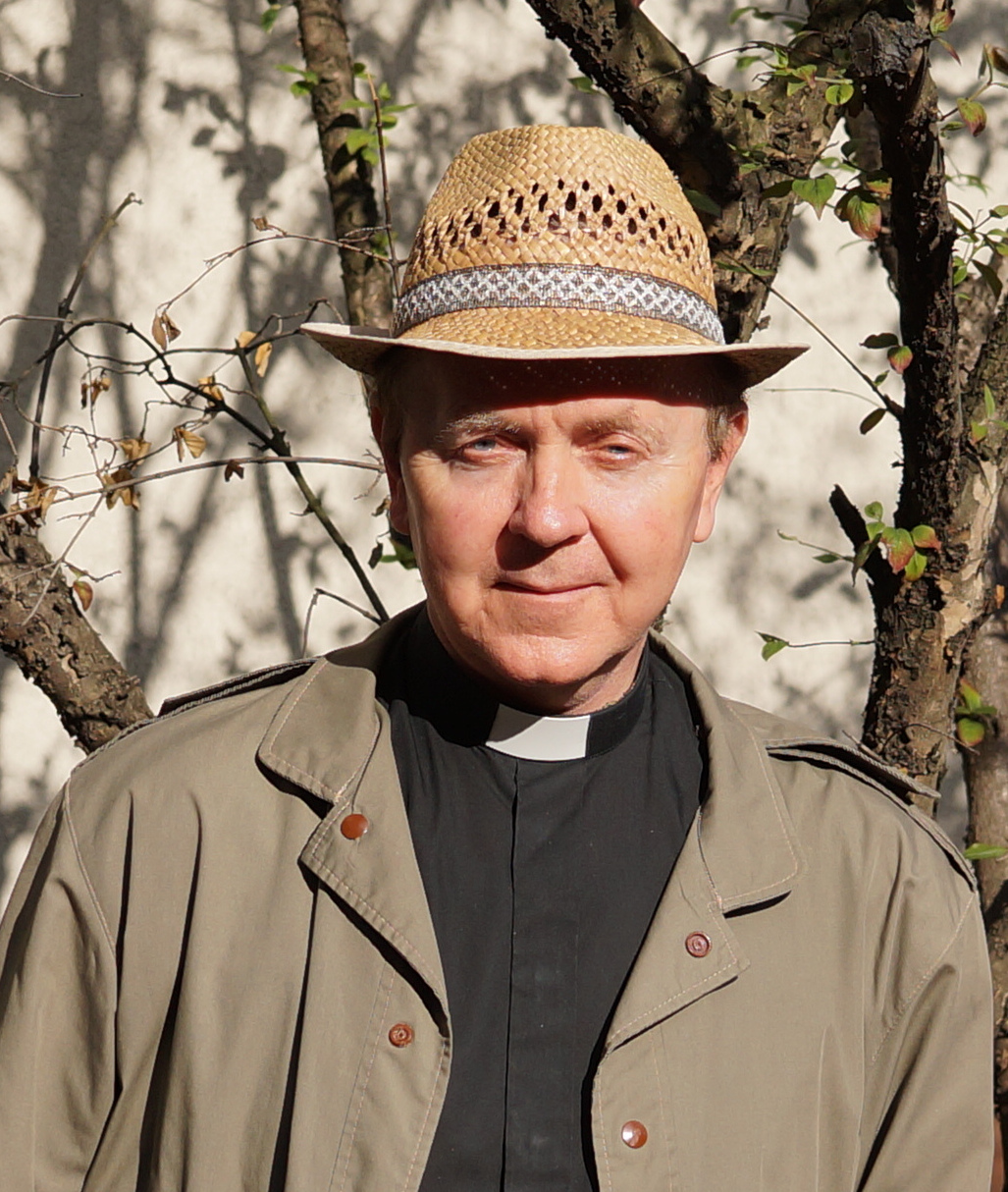
- Janusz Adam Kobierski in 2014.
- Born: 24 December 1947 (age 78); Wólka Łysowska, Poland
- Education: Catholic University of Lublin
- Occupations: Poet, Priest
- Awards: Jan Twardowski Literary Prize

Janusz Adam Kobierski (born 24 December 1947) is a Polish poet and priest of the Catholic Church

== Biography ==
Kobierski was born on 24 December 1947 in Wólka Łysowska. He graduated from the Pedagogic University in Słupsk (The Polish Language and Literature Faculty). He’s been publishing his poems in many periodicals and almanacs since 1972 (f.e. Tygodnik Kulturalny, Miesięcznik Literacki, Literatura, Gość Niedzielny and Niedziela). He is a laureate of some poetic competitions, among others of Warsaw Autumn of Poetry (1980). He has published over 20 books of poetry.

He is a member of The Polish Writers’ Association (Stowarzyszenie Pisarzy Polskich). In 2008, he was awarded the Jan Twardowski Literary Prize for the volume Cierpkie wino (The Tart Wine of Life). He also received a Catholic Publishers’ Association FENIKS 2013 literary award for the volume Szukał Pana. Wybór wierszy biblijnych (He’s Been Looking for Lord).

In 1981, he joined the Congregation of Marian Fathers. After graduation from the Catholic University of Lublin, where he had studied philosophy and theology, on 9 June 1987 in Lublin he received the Sacrament of Holy Orders from Pope John Paul II.

Janusz A. Kobierski lives in Warsaw.

== Works ==
- Zza siódmej skóry (Wydawnictwo Poznańskie, Poznań 1978)
- Kolej rzeczy (Miniatura, Kraków 1990)
- Dar (LSW, Warsaw 1991, ISBN 83-205-4358-4)
- Wyrok dożywotni, first selection of poems (LSW, Warsaw 1993, ISBN 83-205-4467-X)
- Z Ziemi Jezusa (Wydawnictwo Księży Marianów, Warsaw 1997, ISBN 83-7119-128-6)
- Z Ziemi Jezusa, 2nd edition (Wydawnictwo Księży Marianów, Warsaw 1998, ISBN 83-7119-186-3)
- Na ziemi i w niebie, selection of poems (Instytut Wydawniczy Pax, Warsaw 1999, ISBN 83-211-1268-4)
- Poezje wybrane, selection of poems (LSW, Warsaw 2000, ISBN 83-205-4564-1)
- Poezje wybrane, selection of poems, 2nd edition (LSW, Warsaw 2001, ISBN 83-205-4597-8)
- Zapamiętam Świat (LSW, Warsaw 2001, ISBN 83-205-4574-9)
- Święto losów (LSW, Warsaw 2002, ISBN 83-205-4672-9)
- Poezje wybrane, selection of poems, 3rd edition (LSW, Warsaw 2003, ISBN 83-205-4642-7)
- Ku Itace (LSW, Warsaw 2003, OCLC 69546762
- Z Księgi Rodzaju (LSW, Warsaw 2005, ISBN 83-205-4739-3)
- Cierpkie wino życia (LSW, Warsaw 2007, ISBN 978-83-205-4647-7)
- Dotykając jasności (LSW, Warsaw 2009, ISBN 978-83-205-5419-9)
- Niech się stanie (Oficyna Wydawnicza ŁośGraf, Warsaw 2011, ISBN 978-83-62726-29-5)
- Szukał Pana. Wybór wierszy biblijnych (Oficyna Wydawnicza ŁośGraf, Warsaw 2012, ISBN 978-83-63592-04-2)
- Szukał Pana. Wybór wierszy biblijnych, 2nd edition (Oficyna Wydawnicza ASPRA-JR, Warsaw 2013, ISBN 978-83-7545-469-7)
- Kamienne ścieżki. The Stony Paths (Oficyna Wydawnicza ASPRA-JR, Warsaw 2014, ISBN 978-83-7545-566-3) – Polish-English version (translator Zbigniew Lisowski)
- Kamienne ścieżki. The Stony Paths, 2nd edition (Oficyna Wydawnicza ASPRA-JR, Warsaw 2016, ISBN 978-83-7545-682-0) – Polish-English version (translator Zbigniew Lisowski)
- Słowa na wygnaniu (Biblioteka „Toposu”, Sopot 2016, ISBN 978-83-61002-83-3)
- Pole widzenia (Oficyna Wydawnicza ASPRA-JR, Warsaw 2019, ISBN 978-83-7545-892-3)
- Świat jednoczesny (Oficyna Wydawnicza ASPRA-JR, Warsaw 2021, ISBN 978-83-8209-106-9)
