= Lipiny, Gmina Przesmyki =

Lipiny
- Village
- Location within Poland
- Coordinates: 52°15′23″N 22°39′28″E
- Country: Poland
- Voivodeship: Masovian
- County: Siedlce
- Gmina: Przesmyki
- Population: 166

Lipiny [liˈpinɨ] is a village in the administrative district of Gmina Przesmyki, within Siedlce County, Masovian Voivodeship, in east-central Poland.
