= Przesmyki =

- Location within Poland
- Coordinates: 52°16′N 22°35′E
- Country: Poland
- Voivodeship: Masovian
- County: Siedlce

Government
  - Mayor: Andrzej Skolimowski

Population (2007)
  - Total: 670
- Time zone: UTC+1 (CET)
  - Summer (DST): UTC+2 (CEST)
- Postal code: 08-109
- Area code: +48 25
- Car plates: WSI
- Website: http://www.przesmyki.e-bip.pl

Przesmyki [pʂɛsˈmɨki] (also Peresmyki (Belarusian, historical). ) is a village in Masovian Voivodeship, near Siedlce, eastern Poland. It is the seat of the administrative district Gmina Przesmyki.

The first church at Przesmyki was built in 1465, and burnt down by the Swedish army in 1657. The present church is from 1776 and is recognized as a valuable sacral monument of Southern Podlasie region.

Przesmyki is famous for its potato production and annual regional feast called Dokopiny Ziemniaka (Potato Gleaning), a potato harvest festival which takes place at the end of September.
