= Zaborów, Siedlce County =

Zaborów
- Village
- Location within Poland
- Coordinates: 52°17′28″N 22°39′21″E
- Country: Poland
- Voivodeship: Masovian
- County: Siedlce
- Gmina: Przesmyki
- Population: 96

Zaborów [zaˈbɔruf] is a village in the administrative district of Gmina Przesmyki, within Siedlce County, Masovian Voivodeship, in east-central Poland.
