= Kolonia Łysowa =

Village in Gmina Przesmyki, Poland

- Village
- Location within Poland
- Coordinates: 52°17′11″N 22°43′07″E
- Country: Poland
- Voivodeship: Masovian
- County: Siedlce
- Gmina: Przesmyki

Kolonia Łysowa [kɔˈlɔɲa wɨˈsɔva] is a village in the administrative district of Gmina Przesmyki, within Siedlce County, Masovian Voivodeship, in east-central Poland.
