= Kamianki-Nicki =

- Village
- Location within Poland
- Coordinates: 52°18′37″N 22°34′44″E
- Country: Poland
- Voivodeship: Masovian
- County: Siedlce
- Gmina: Przesmyki

Kamianki-Nicki [kaˈmjanki ˈnit͡ski] is a village in the administrative district of Gmina Przesmyki, within Siedlce County, Masovian Voivodeship, in east-central Poland.
