= Podraczynie =

- Village
- Location within Poland
- Coordinates: 52°17′21″N 22°37′47″E
- Country: Poland
- Voivodeship: Masovian
- County: Siedlce
- Gmina: Przesmyki

Podraczynie [pɔdraˈt͡ʂɨɲɛ] is a village in the administrative district of Gmina Przesmyki, within Siedlce County, Masovian Voivodeship, in east-central Poland.
