= Kamianki Lackie =

- Village
- Location within Poland
- Coordinates: 52°19′4″N 22°34′59″E
- Country: Poland
- Voivodeship: Masovian
- County: Siedlce
- Gmina: Przesmyki

Kamianki Lackie [kaˈmjanki ˈlat͡skʲɛ] is a village in the administrative district of Gmina Przesmyki, within Siedlce County, Masovian Voivodeship, in east-central Poland.
