= Tarków =

- Village
- Location within Poland
- Coordinates: 52°16′N 22°31′E
- Country: Poland
- Voivodeship: Masovian
- County: Siedlce
- Gmina: Przesmyki

Tarków [ˈtarkuf] is a village in the administrative district of Gmina Przesmyki, within Siedlce County, Masovian Voivodeship, in east-central Poland.
