= Łysów, Masovian Voivodeship =

Łysów
- Village
- Location within Poland
- Coordinates: 52°17′31″N 22°41′24″E
- Country: Poland
- Voivodeship: Masovian
- County: Siedlce
- Gmina: Przesmyki

Łysów [ˈwɨsuf] is a village in the administrative district of Gmina Przesmyki, within Siedlce County, Masovian Voivodeship, in east-central Poland.
