= Denis Koberskiy =

Russian footballer (born 1974)

Personal information
- Full name: Denis Vitalyevich Koberskiy
- Date of birth: 24 February 1974 (age 52)
- Place of birth: Khabarovsk, Russian SFSR
- Height: 1.74 m (5 ft 8 1/2 in)
- Position: Midfielder

Youth career
- FC Luch Vladivostok

Senior career*
Years	Team	Apps	(Gls)
1990–1996	FC Luch Vladivostok	77	(2)
1997–1998	FC Zhemchuzhina Sochi	11	(0)
1997–1998	→ FC Zhemchuzhina-2 Sochi (loans)	12	(1)
1998	FC Kuban Krasnodar	11	(1)
1999–2000	FC Oryol	53	(5)
2000	FC Zhemchuzhina Sochi	9	(0)
2001	FC Metallurg-Metiznik Magnitogorsk	20	(0)
2002–2003	FC Okean Nakhodka	30	(1)
2003–2004	FC Sibiryak Bratsk	33	(1)
2005	FC Metallurg-Metiznik Magnitogorsk	34	(3)
2006–2010	FC Stolitsa Moscow		
- * Club domestic league appearances and goals

Denis Vitalyevich Koberskiy (Russian: Денис Витальевич Коберский; born 24 February 1974) is a former Russian football player.

His father Vitali Koberskiy is a coach and a former player.
