= Vitali Koberskiy =

Russian footballer (born 1946)

Personal information
- Full name: Vitali Miroslavovich Koberskiy
- Date of birth: 25 February 1946 (age 80)
- Place of birth: Khabarovsk, Soviet Union
- Height: 1.69 m (5 ft 6 1/2 in)
- Position: Midfielder

Youth career
- FC Zaria Khabarovsk

Senior career*
Years	Team	Apps	(Gls)
1964	SKA Khabarovsk	13	(0)
1965	Start Angarsk		
1966–1970	Dinamo Minsk	111	(15)
1971	Metalist Kharkiv	27	(2)
1972	Spartak Semipalatinsk		
1973–1974	SKA Khabarovsk	59	(12)

Managerial career
- 1981–1984: Luch Vladivostok
- 1988–1991: Luch Vladivostok
- 1992–1995: Luch Vladivostok (director)
- 1997: Luch Vladivostok
- 1999–2000: Oryol
- 2001: Metallurg-Metiznik Magnitogorsk
- 2004: Slavyansk Slavyansk-na-Kubani
- 2004–2005: Kavkaztransgaz Ryzdvyany
- * Club domestic league appearances and goals

Vitali Miroslavovich Koberskiy (Russian: Виталий Мирославович Коберский; born 25 February 1946) is a Russian professional football coach and a former player.

== Career ==
Koberskiy's father, Miroslav, was a former football player born in Kyiv of Polish ethnic origins who moved to Khabarovsk from Ukraine. He managed local side FC Zaria Khabarovsk where his son Vitali began his football career. Koberskiy began playing professional football with FC SKA-Khabarovsk before joining FC Dinamo Minsk where he played in the Soviet Top League.

After he retired from playing, Koberskiy became a football manager. He led Russian Second Division side FC Oryol during 1997. In 2004, he managed Second Division sides FC Slavyansk Slavyansk-na-Kubani and FC Kavkaztransgaz Izobilny.

== Personal ==
His son Denis Koberskiy also was a football player.
