= Ordinariate for Eastern Catholics in Argentina =

Eastern Catholic jurisdiction structure

Location
- Country: Argentina

Statistics
- Population: (as of 2013); 2,000
- Parishes: 1

Information
- Established: February 19, 1959; 67 years ago

Current leadership
- Pope: Leo XIV
- Bishop: Jorge Ignacio García Cuerva

The Ordinariate for Eastern Catholics in Argentina (Spanish: Ordinariato para los fieles de ritos orientales en Argentina) is a Catholic Ordinariate for Eastern Catholic faithful (pseudo-diocesan jurisdiction within a Latin territory), jointly for all Eastern Catholics, regardless of rite, living in Argentina.

== History ==
On August 27, 1897, a first community of faithful of the Ukrainian Greek Catholic Church established itself in Apóstoles, in the Misiones Province. In 1908 the first priest of the Byzantine rite arrived from Brazil: Father Clemente Bzhujovski, a religious of the Basilian Order of Saint Josaphat who celebrated his first Divine Liturgy in Argentina on March 21, 1908, in Posadas.

At the end of the nineteenth century the immigration of Greek-Melkite Catholics began in Argentina, which peaked between 1910 and 1930. Between 1949 and 1950 there was a second wave. They were mostly natives of Syria and Lebanon but a small part of the families came from Palestine, Egypt and Jordan. The celebration of the sacraments according to their rite began in 1910 with the arrival of the archimandrite Teófanos Badaoui. Their church of San Jorge was built in 1919 and was consecrated on 20 June 1920 by the auxiliary bishop of Córdoba Inocencio Dávila. In 1948 the Jesuit Philippe de Regis de Gatimel, former rector of the Collegium Russicum in Rome, established a mission for the faithful of the Russian Greek Catholic Church. He died in 1955. Soon after, Father Ion Dan came from Rome to give spiritual care of the faithful of the Romanian Greek Catholic Church. He died on August 28, 1986.

It was established on 19 February 1959 by Pope John XXIII, on territory previously only served by the Latin church, in which the Holy See united the faithful of the Eastern Catholic Churches that did not have their own hierarchy in the territory of Argentina. It was established on May 17, 1959, as a personal jurisdiction over the parishes and Eastern Catholic faithful. The Latin hierarch of Buenos Aires was appointed as ordinarian of the Eastern rite believers.

In 1961, the Ordinariate united around 250,000 believers from various Eastern Catholic churches. It included 20 temples and 33 priests. After the formation of its church structure in Argentina, four rite-particular churches sui iuris came out of the jurisdiction of the Ordinariate of Argentina for the faithful Eastern rite and have their own suffragan Eparchies (dioceses) in the ecclesiastical province of Buenos Aires:

- Ukrainian Catholic Eparchy of Santa María del Patrocinio in Buenos Aires, Ukrainian language Byzantine Rite for Ukrainian Catholics in all Argentina, with cathedral see in Buenos Aires, an apostolic exarchate since February 9, 1968 and eparchy since April 24, 1978.
- Armenian Catholic Apostolic Exarchate of Latin America and Mexico, since July 3, 1981 and Eparchy of San Gregorio de Narek en Buenos Aires, from Armenian Rite, an eparchy since February 18, 1989.
- Maronite Catholic Eparchy of San Charbel in Buenos Aires, an Antiochene Rite, an eparchy since October 5, 1990.
- Melkite Greek Catholic Apostolic Exarchate of Argentina from Byzantine Rite, an apostolic exarchate since March 21, 2002.

== Territory and statistics ==
The Ordinariate has its jurisdiction over all Eastern Rite believers in Argentina who do not have their own ordinary. At present there are missions of the Russian Greek Catholic Church, heirs of the Russian mission conducted by the Jesuits and the Romanian Greek Catholic Church in the chapel of Saints Peter and Paul in Buenos Aires in which operates a priest. The chapel follows the Julian calendar and is also used by the faithful of the Romanian Orthodox Church. In the province of Buenos Aires there is also a small Russian Byzantine community founded in 1984: the Byzantine Center of Our Lady of Vladimir in Campana. A small group of faithful of the Italian-Albanian Church meets at Luis Guillon, in the Esteban Echeverría Partido of the province of Buenos Aires. The Italo-Albanians were around 12,000 at the time of the creation of the ordinariate and were concentrated mainly in Luján. Most of them, however, passed to the Latin rite. The few hundreds of Chaldean faithful are completions dispersed throughout the territory.

As per 2013, it pastorally served 2,000 Catholics with a single parish in the capital, Buenos Aires, at Avenida Rivadavia 415.

=== Russian Catholic Mission in Argentina ===
The Russian Catholic mission in Argentina included the Russian Christian Revival Society in Buenos Aires, the publishing house and the same-named newspaper For the Truth!, the Salguero printing house, the Institute of Russian Culture in Buenos Aires, the Parish of Peter and Paul, Guames (Church of the Holy Apostles Peter and Paul: Misión rusa, Güemes 2962), the Transfiguration of Christ Skete, El Castilla–Ba Monteverde, Los Cardales, and the Boarding School of St. Apostle Andrew the First-Called. The mission belonged to the so-called Russian apostolate. The head of the mission was Philippe de Feuges, except for him in the mission worked Russian priests George Kovalenko, Alexander Kulik, Nikolai Alexseev, Vsevolod Roshko and laymen M.V. Rozanov and A. Stavrovsky.

== Episcopal ordinaries ==
Ordinaries for Eastern Catholics in Argentina (all Roman Rite):

- Antonio Caggiano (15 August 1959 – retired 21 April 1975)
- Juan Carlos Aramburu (21 April 1975 – retired 30 October 1990)
- Antonio Quarracino (30 October 1990 – death 28 February 1998), Metropolitan Archbishop of Buenos Aires (Argentina) (10 July 1990 – 28 February 1998), created cardinal-priest of S. Maria della Salute a Primavalle (28 June 1991 – 28 February 1998); previously Bishop of Nueve de Julio (Argentina) (3 February 1962 – 3 August 1968), transferred Bishop of Avellaneda (Argentina) (3 August 1968 – 18 December 1985), also secretary general of Latin American Episcopal Council (1979–1983) promoted president of Latin American Episcopal Council (1983–1987), promoted Metropolitan Archbishop of La Plata (Argentina) (18 December 1985 – 10 July 1990), president of Episcopal Conference of Argentina (1990–1996)
- Jorge Bergoglio, S.J. (30 November 1998 – 13 March 2013), Metropolitan Archbishop of Buenos Aires (28 February 1998 – 13 March 2013) (succeeding as former auxiliary bishop of Buenos Aires (20 May 1992 – 3 June 1997) and titular bishop of Auca (20 May 1992 – 3 June 1997), promoted coadjutor archbishop of Buenos Aires 3 June 1997 – 28 February 1998); later created cardinal-priest of S. Roberto Bellarmino (21 February 2001 [14 October 2001] – 13 March 2013), president of Episcopal Conference of Argentina (8 November 2005 – 8 November 2011), elected Supreme Pontiff as Pope Francis (13 March 2013 [19 March 2013] – 21 April 2025)
- Mario Aurelio Poli (4 May 2013 – ...), Metropolitan Archbishop of Buenos Aires (28 March 2013 – ...), created Cardinal-Priest of the above title S. Roberto Bellarmino (22 February 2014 [23 February 2014] – ...), vice-president of Episcopal Conference of Argentina (11 November 2014 – ...); previously titular bishop of Abidda (8 February 2002 – 24 June 2008) as Auxiliary Bishop of Buenos Aires (8 February 2002 – 24 June 2008), next Bishop of Santa Rosa (Argentina) (24 June 2008 – 28 March 2013).

== Auxiliary bishop of Argentina of the Eastern Rite in charge ==
- Andrés Sapelak, S.D.B. (14 August 1961 – 9 February 1968), born in Poland, titular bishop of Sebastopolis in Thracia (14 August 1961 – 24 April 1978); later Apostolic Exarch of Argentina of the Ukrainians (Argentina) (9 February 1968 – 24 April 1978), promoted Bishop of Santa María del Patrocinio en Buenos Aires of the Ukrainians (Argentina) (24 April 1978 – 12 December 1997)
- Manuel Augusto Cárdenas (11 November 1975 – 11 February 1992), previously Auxiliary Bishop of Buenos Aires (7 April 1962 – 22 April 1975), Titular Bishop of Aulon (7 April 1962 – 28 July 1998).

== See also ==
- Catholic Church in Argentina
- List of Catholic dioceses in Argentina
