= Roshko =

Roshko is a surname. Notable people with the surname include:

- Anatol Roshko (1923–2017), Canadian-American physicist and engineer
- Georgy Roshko (1915–2003), French Catholic priest
- Vsevolod Roshko (1917–1984), Russian historian, priest and missionary

== See also ==
- Roško
- Roszko
