= Piccinini =

Piccinini is an Italian surname. Notable people with the surname include:

- Alberto Piccinini (footballer) (1923−1972), Italian professional football player
- Alessandro Piccinini (1566 – c. 1638), Italian lutenist and composer
- Amelia Piccinini (1917–1979), Italian athlete
- Eduardo Piccinini (born 1968), Brazilian butterfly swimmer
- Francesca Piccinini (born 1979), Italian volleyball player
- Gaetano Piccinini (1904–1972), Italian priest of the Don Orione Congregation
- Gualtiero Piccinini (born 1970), Italian and American philosopher
- Marco Piccinini (born 1952), Monegasque personality, businessman and politician
- Marina Piccinini (born 1968), Italian American virtuoso flautist
- Patricia Piccinini (born 1965), Australian artist

== See also ==
- Joe Piccininni (1922–1995), Canadian city councillor
