= Eparchy of Santa María del Patrocinio in Buenos Aires =

Eastern Catholic eparchy in Argentina

Eparchy of Santa María del Patrocinio en Buenos Aires Eparchia Sanctae Mariae a Patrocinio Bonaërensis Ucrainorum Буенос-Айреська єпархія Покрови Пресвятої Богородиці Eparquía de Nuestra Señora del Patrocinio en Buenos Aires
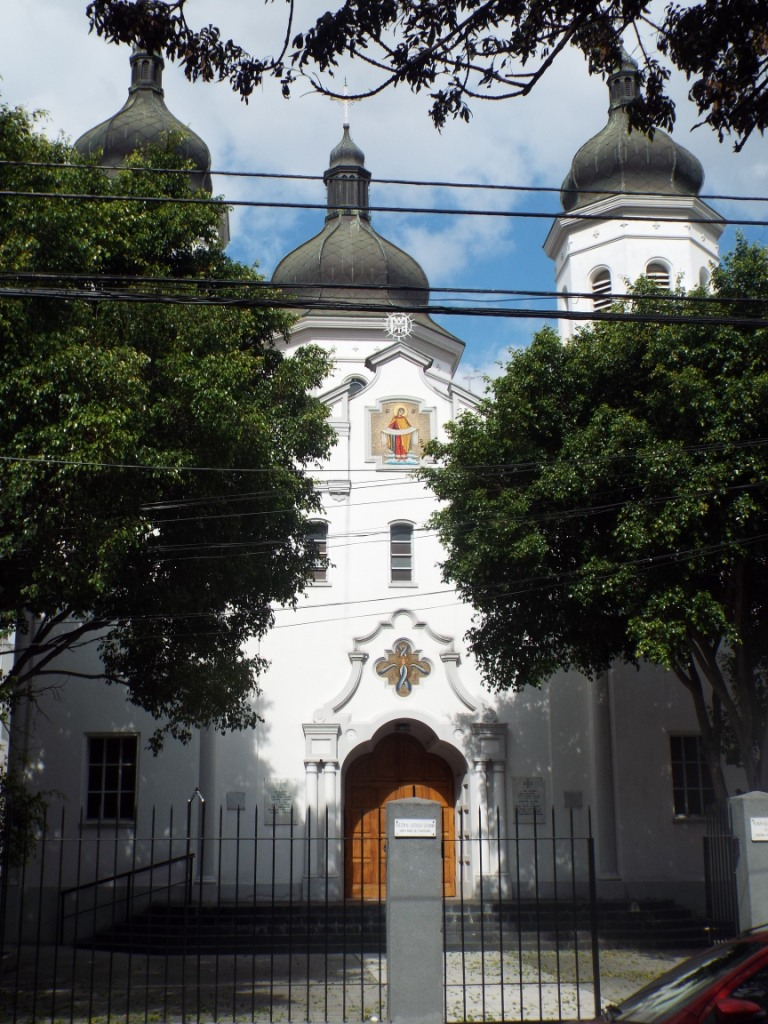
- Cathedral of the Intercession of the Holy Virgin in Buenos Aires; Catedral Nuestra Señora del Patrocinio en Buenos Aires

Location
- Country: Argentina
- Territory: Argentina
- Ecclesiastical province: Buenos Aires
- Headquarters: Buenos Aires, Argentina
- Population: 160,000

Information
- Sui iuris church: Ukrainian Greek Catholic
- Rite: Byzantine Rite
- Established: April 24, 1978
- Cathedral: Catedral Nuestra Señora del Patrocinio (Pokrov)
- Patron saint: Santísima Virgen del Patrocinio

Current leadership
- Pope: Leo XIV
- Major Archbishop: Sviatoslav Shevchuk
- Bishop: Daniel Kozelinski Netto
- Metropolitan Archbishop: Mario Aurelio Poli

Website
- www.eparquia-pokrov.org

The Ukrainian Catholic Eparchy of Santa María del Patrocinio en Buenos Aires (Latin: Eparchia Sanctae Mariae a Patrocinio Bonaënsis) is an eparchy (diocese, bishopric) of the Ukrainian Greek Catholic Church, which uses the Byzantine Rite in the Ukrainian language, for its faithful in major immigration country Argentina.

Its cathedral see is in the capital city of Buenos Aires, but must not be confused with the Roman Catholic (Latin rite) Metropolitan see of the ecclesiastical province of Buenos Aires in Argentina.

== History ==
- February 19, 1959: Ordinariate for Eastern Catholics in Argentina Established
- February 9, 1968: Established as the Ukrainian Catholic Apostolic Exarchate of Argentina
- April 24, 1978: Promoted as Eparchy of Santa María del Patrocinio en Buenos Aires

== Episcopate ==
Apostolic Exarchs of Argentina (Ukrainian Rite)

- Bishop Andrés Sapelak, S.D.B. (February 9, 1968 – April 24, 1978)

Bishops of Santa María del Patrocinio en Buenos Aires (Ukrainian Rite)

- Bishop Andrés Sapelak, S.D.B. (April 24, 1978 – December 12, 1997)
  - Bishop Miguel Mykycej, F.D.P. (Apostolic Administrator January 21, 1998 – April 24, 1999)
- Bishop Miguel Mykycej, F.D.P. (April 24, 1999 – April 10, 2010)
  - Apostolic Administrator of Santa María del Patrocinio en Buenos Aires (Ukrainian Rite)
  - Sviatoslav Shevchuk, (April 10, 2010 – March 25, 2011)
  - Apostolic Administrator sede vacante of Santa María del Patrocinio en Buenos Aires
  - Bishop Daniel Kozelinski Netto (June 22, 2011 – October 8, 2016)
- Bishop Daniel Kozelinski Netto (since October 8, 2016)

=== Auxiliary bishops ===
- Miguel Mykycej, F.D.P. (1990-1999), appointed Bishop here
- Sviatoslav Shevchuk (2009-2011), elected Major Archbishop of Kyiv-Halyč {Kiev} (Ukrainian), Ukraine

== References and external links ==
- GCatholic.org
- Catholic Hierarchy
