= Andrés Sapelak =

Andrés Sapelak, S.D.B.
- Bishop of Eparchy of Santa María del Patrocinio en Buenos Aires
- Church: Ukrainian Greek Catholic Church
- See: Eparchy of Santa María del Patrocinio en Buenos Aires
- In office: 1968 - 1997
- Predecessor: new creation
- Successor: Miguel Mykycej
- Other post: Auxiliary Bishop for Ordinariate for Eastern Rites (1961–1968)

Orders
- Ordination: June 29, 1949 by Ivan Buchko
- Consecration: October 15, 1961 by Ivan Buchko

Personal details
- Born: 13 December 1919 Ryszkowa Wola, Second Polish Republic
- Died: 6 November 2017 (aged 97) Vynnyky, Lviv Oblast, Ukraine

Andrés Sapelak, S.D.B. (Ukrainian: Андрій Михайлович Сапеляк; Polish: Andrzej Sapelak; December 13, 1919 – November 6, 2017) was an Argentine hierarch of the Ukrainian Greek Catholic Church. At the time of his death he was the oldest bishop in this Eastern Catholic Church.

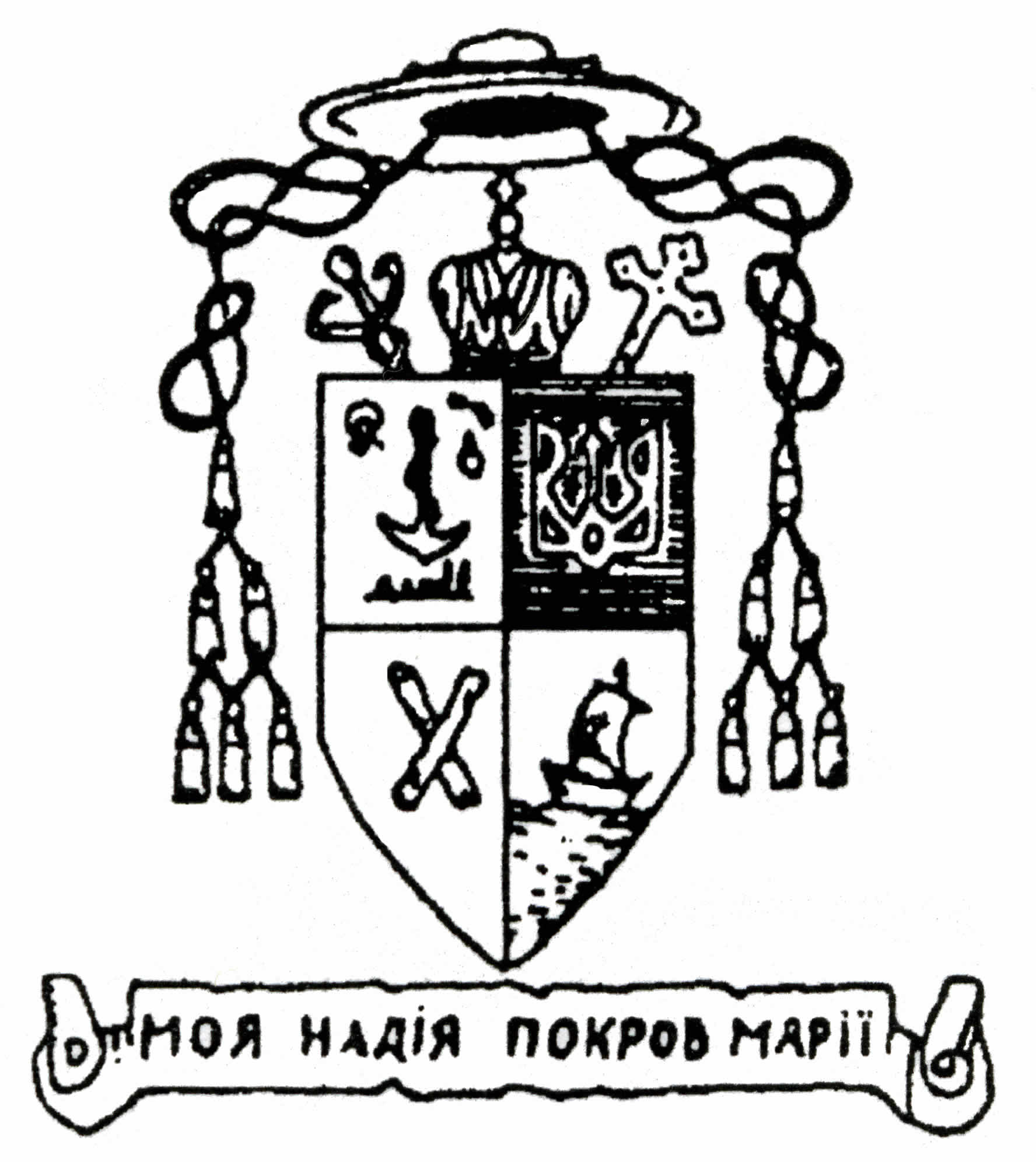
Coat of arms of Bishop Andrés Sapelak

== Biography ==
Sapelak was born in Ryszkowa Wola, Second Polish Republic, in the Ukrainian family of Mykhaylo and Ahafiya (née Yarosh) Sapelak and ordained a priest on June 29, 1949, joining the religious order of Salesians of Saint John Bosco. He was appointed Auxiliary bishop of Faithful of the Oriental Rites (Argentina) as well as Titular Bishop of Sebastopolis on August 14, 1961, and consecrated on October 15, 1961. On February 9, 1968, Sapelak was appointed bishop of Eparchy of Santa María del Patrocinio en Buenos Aires where he remained until his retirement on December 12, 1997.

Sapelak then returned to Ukraine and worked as parish priest in Verkhnodniprovsk city in the Ukrainian Catholic Archiepiscopal Exarchate of Donetsk – Kharkiv from 1999 until 2014. In November 2013, he received Ukrainian citizenship. On November 6, 2017, he died in the Salesian house in Vynnyky near Lviv, where he resided from 2014.

Catholic Church titles
Preceded by Sante Mei	Titular Bishop of Sebastopolis in Thracia; 1961–1978	Succeeded by Vacant
New title	Eparchial Bishop of Santa María del Patrocinio en Buenos Aires (until 1978 as Apostolic Exarch of Argentina); 1968–1997	Succeeded by Miguel Mykycej (as Apostolic Administrator)
