= Miguel Mykycej =

Miguel Mykycej, F.D.P.
- Eparchial Bishop of Eparchy of Santa María del Patrocinio en Buenos Aires
- Church: Ukrainian Greek Catholic Church
- Appointed: 20 January 1998 (as Apostolic Administrator); 24 April 1999 (as Eparchial Bishop)
- Term ended: 10 April 2010
- Predecessor: Andrés Sapelak
- Successor: Sviatoslav Shevchuk
- Other posts: Auxiliary Bishop of Santa María del Patrocinio en Buenos Aires (1990–1998); Titular Bishop of Nazianzus (1990–1999)

Orders
- Ordination: 21 April 1963 (Priest) by Josyf Slipyj
- Consecration: 14 October 1990 (Bishop) by Andrés Sapelak

Personal details
- Born: Mykhaylo Mykytsey; 17 October 1934 Horokholyna, Second Polish Republic (now Ukraine)
- Died: 20 May 2017 (aged 82) Buenos Aires, Argentina

Bishop Miguel Mykycej, F.D.P. (Ukrainian: Михайло Микицей; 17 October 1934 – 20 May 2017) was a Poland-born Argentine Ukrainian Greek Catholic hierarch. He served as a Titular Bishop of Nazianzus and Auxiliary Bishop of Eparchy of Santa María del Patrocinio en Buenos Aires from 23 June 1990 until 20 January 1998; Apostolic Administrator the same Eparchy from 20 January 1998 until 24 April 1999; and as the Eparchial Bishop of Santa María del Patrocinio en Buenos Aires from 24 April 1999 until his retirement on 10 April 2010.

== Life ==
Bishop Mykycej was born in the peasant family of Vasyl and Mariya (née Martynyuk) Mykytsey in Horokholyna, Second Polish Republic /present-day in Ivano-Frankivsk Raion, Ivano-Frankivsk Oblast, Ukraine. In 1938 his family emigrated to Paraguay and in 1945 was transferred to Argentina. After the attending of the Orionine Fathers minor seminary in Buenos Aires, Mykycey subsequently joined the Sons of Divine Providence, where he had a profession on February 12, 1954, and a solemn profession on February 11, 1961. He was ordained as priest on April 21, 1963, after studies in the Orionists Theological Seminary in Argentina and following studies in Italy in the Pontifical Lateran University with a licentiate in theology.

After returning from Italy, he served as teacher and subsequently director of the Don Orione Institute in Presidencia Roque Sáenz Peña and in the same time made a pastoral work for the Ukrainian Greek-Catholics in the Northern Argentina.

On June 23, 1990, Fr. Mykycej was nominated by Pope John Paul II and on October 14, 1990 consecrated to the Episcopate as an auxiliary bishop. The principal consecrator was Andrés Sapelak, the first bishop for Ukrainian Greek-Catholics in Argentina.

He died on May 20, 2017, at age 82.

Catholic Church titles
Preceded by Demetrius Greschuk	Titular Bishop of Nazianzus; 1990–1998	Succeeded by Vacant
Preceded by Andrés Sapelak	Eparchial Bishop of Santa María del Patrocinio en Buenos Aires; 1998–2010	Succeeded by Sviatoslav Shevchuk (as Apostolic Administrator)
