= Luigi Orione =

19th and 20th-century Italian monk, social advocate and religious founder

Saint Luigi Orione F.D.P.
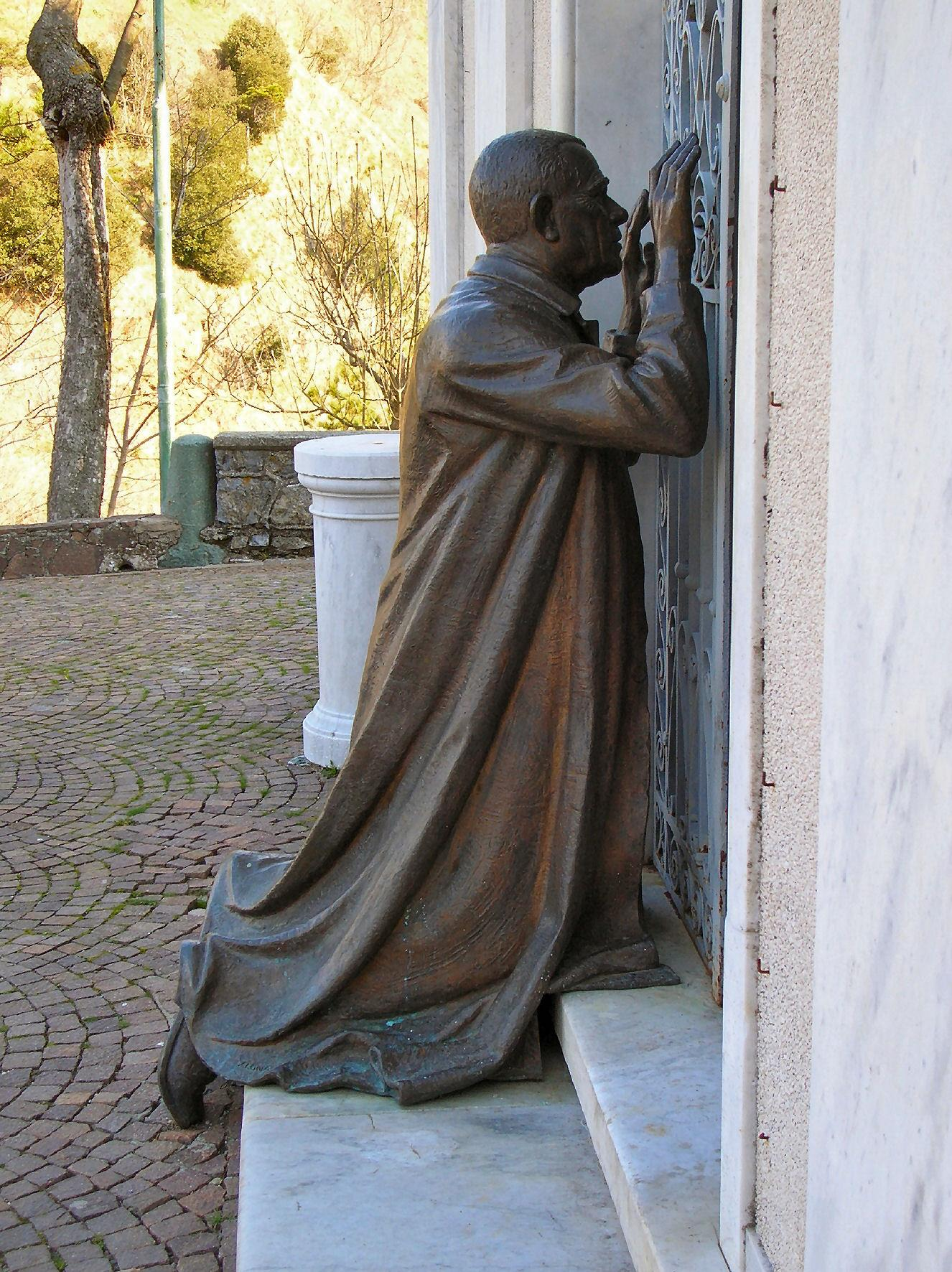
- Statue of Orione in Ceranesi, Liguria, Italy

Priest and founder
- Born: June 23, 1872; Pontecurone, Alessandria, Kingdom of Italy
- Died: March 12, 1940 (aged 67); Sanremo, Liguria, Kingdom of Italy
- Venerated in: Roman Catholic Church (Sons of Divine Providence and Little Missionary Sisters of Charity)
- Beatified: October 26, 1980, Vatican City, by Pope John Paul II
- Canonized: May 16, 2004, Vatican City, by Pope John Paul II
- Major shrine: Shrine of the Madonna della Guardia, Tortona, Alessandria, Italy
- Feast: May 16

Luigi Giovanni Orione (June 23, 1872 – March 12, 1940) was an Italian priest who was active in answering the social needs of his nation as it faced the social upheavals of the late 19th century. To this end, he founded a religious institute of men. He has been declared a saint by the Catholic Church.

== Life ==
=== Early life ===
Orione was born into a poor family at Pontecurone, in the Province of Alessandria, in the Piedmont region of Italy, on the vigil of the feast day of the Nativity of St. John the Baptist. He was named after Aloysius Gonzaga and John the Baptist. He was baptized the next day by Michele Cattaneo, the parish priest of the town. His father, Vittorio, was a street paver of few words and his mother, Carolina, was an energetic, pious, thrifty homemaker.

At thirteen years of age he entered the Franciscan Friary of Voghera (Pavia), but he left after one year owing to poor health. From 1886 to 1889 Orione was a student at the Valdocco Oratory in Turin operated by the Salesians of Don Bosco. There he gained the attention of John Bosco, the founder, who numbered him among his favorite pupils. From the age of 13, Luigi began to suffer health problems. However, three years later, in 1888, he was present at Bosco's death in Turin. At that moment his ailments were miraculously cured.

Orione was determined to become a priest and entered the seminary of the Archdiocese of Turin. He became a member of both the San Marziano Society for Mutual Help and the Society of Saint Vincent de Paul. In 1892, inspired by the education he had received from the followers of John Bosco, the 20-year-old seminarian opened his own oratory to educate the poor boys of the city, and the following year he started a boarding school for the poor. He was ordained a priest on April 13, 1895.

=== Founder ===
Starting in 1899, Orione started to gather a group of priests and clerics that were to become Piccola Opera della Divina Provvidenza (Little Work of Divine Providence). In 1903 the group received the full authorization of the bishop as a religious congregation called the Sons of Divine Providence.

One of the priests who was in his inner circle was Lorenzo Perosi, who later became Perpetual Director of the Sistine Chapel Choir and one of the most famous composers of sacred music. Perosi was born in the same year and the same region as Orione; they remained lifelong friends.

In 1908 Orione went to Messina, Sicily, and Reggio Calabria, Calabria, both of which had been devastated by earthquakes. He dedicated three years to help those in need, most especially the caring of orphans. In 1915 he went to Marsica when that region had a similarly devastating earthquake. That same year he founded the Little Missionary Sisters of Charity.

At the end of World War I, Orione began to expand his work. He founded schools, farming colonies, charity organizations and nursing homes—always with a special emphasis on helping orphans and the poor. Over the next two decades, he started foundations throughout Italy and the Americas.

=== Shrine of the Madonna della Guardia ===
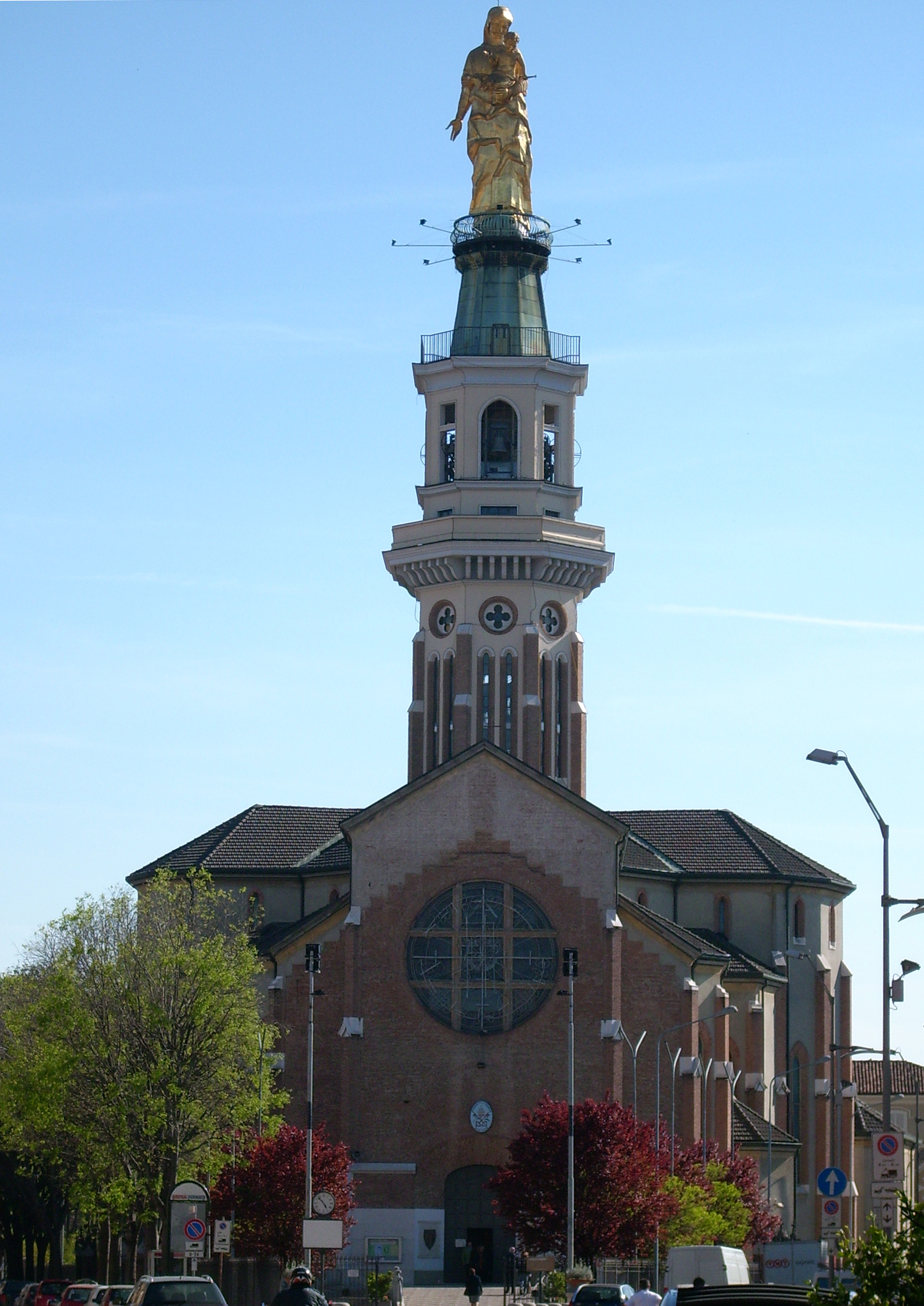
Shrine of the Madonna della Guardia

In 1931, he founded the Shrine of the Madonna della Guardia in Tortona, which to this day is the principal church in the world for the Orionine order. It is also a center for annual music festivals in honor of Orione's friend, the hitherto mentioned Perosi.

=== Final illness ===
In the winter of 1940, Orione started to suffer serious cardiac and pulmonary ailments. He went to Sanremo to recuperate, but not without a tinge of regret. On March 8, 1940, on the eve of his departure for Sanremo, Don Orione is recorded as saying, "It is not among the palm trees that I would like to die," he said, "but amongst the poor who are Jesus Christ." Four days later, surrounded by fellow priests of his Orionine order, Luigi Orione died. His last words were, "Jesus, Jesus! Jesus! I am going..." Now he is the patron saint of the abandoned.

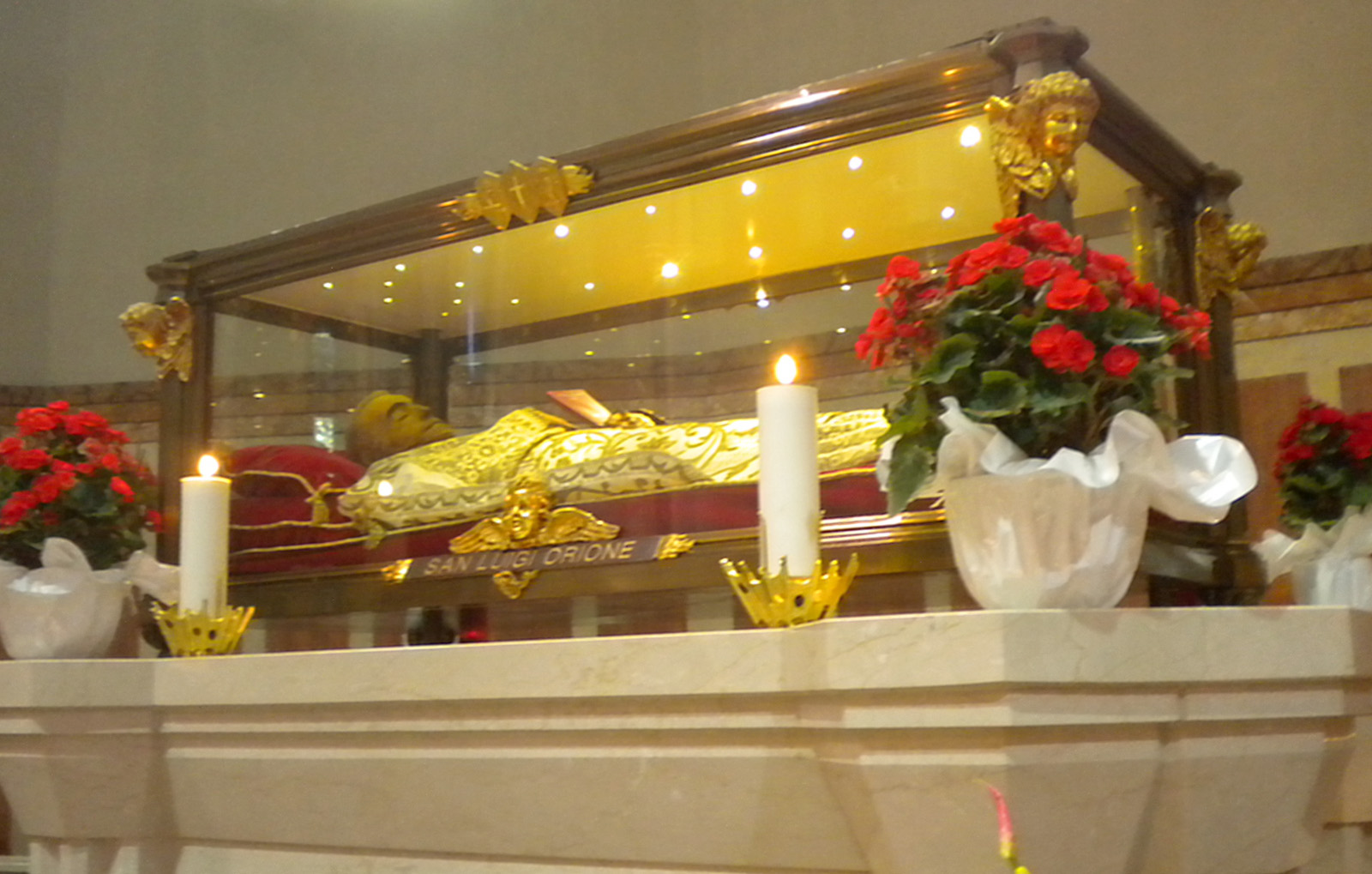
Saint Luigi Orione's body in Sanctuary of Nostra Signora della Guardia, in Tortona, Italy

Don Orione was buried in the Santuario di Nostra Signora della Guardia in Tortona, the church that he himself built in 1931, with the help of priests and acolytes. It was built in gratitude to the Madonna for ending the hostilities of World War I. It is the most important pilgrimage site in the world for Orione's followers.

== Veneration ==
Orione's mortal remains have rested in the crypt of the Shrine of La Madonna della Guardia in Tortona, which he himself founded, since his burial on March 19, 1940. His body was later exhumed in 1965 for examination.

Orione's cause was formally opened on 14 May 1937. On October 26, 1980, he was beatified by Pope John Paul II. Nearly 24 years later, he was canonized by that same pope, on May 16, 2004.

Today the charitable organizations begun by Orione are still operating in abundance throughout the world. In the United States, the national shrine and headquarters of the Sons of Divine Providence is located on a well-known hill in East Boston, Massachusetts, known as Orient Heights.

== See also ==
- Giuseppe Benedetto Cottolengo
- Gaetano Piccinini
