= 522 Spanish Martyrs =

Martyrs of the Spanish Civil War

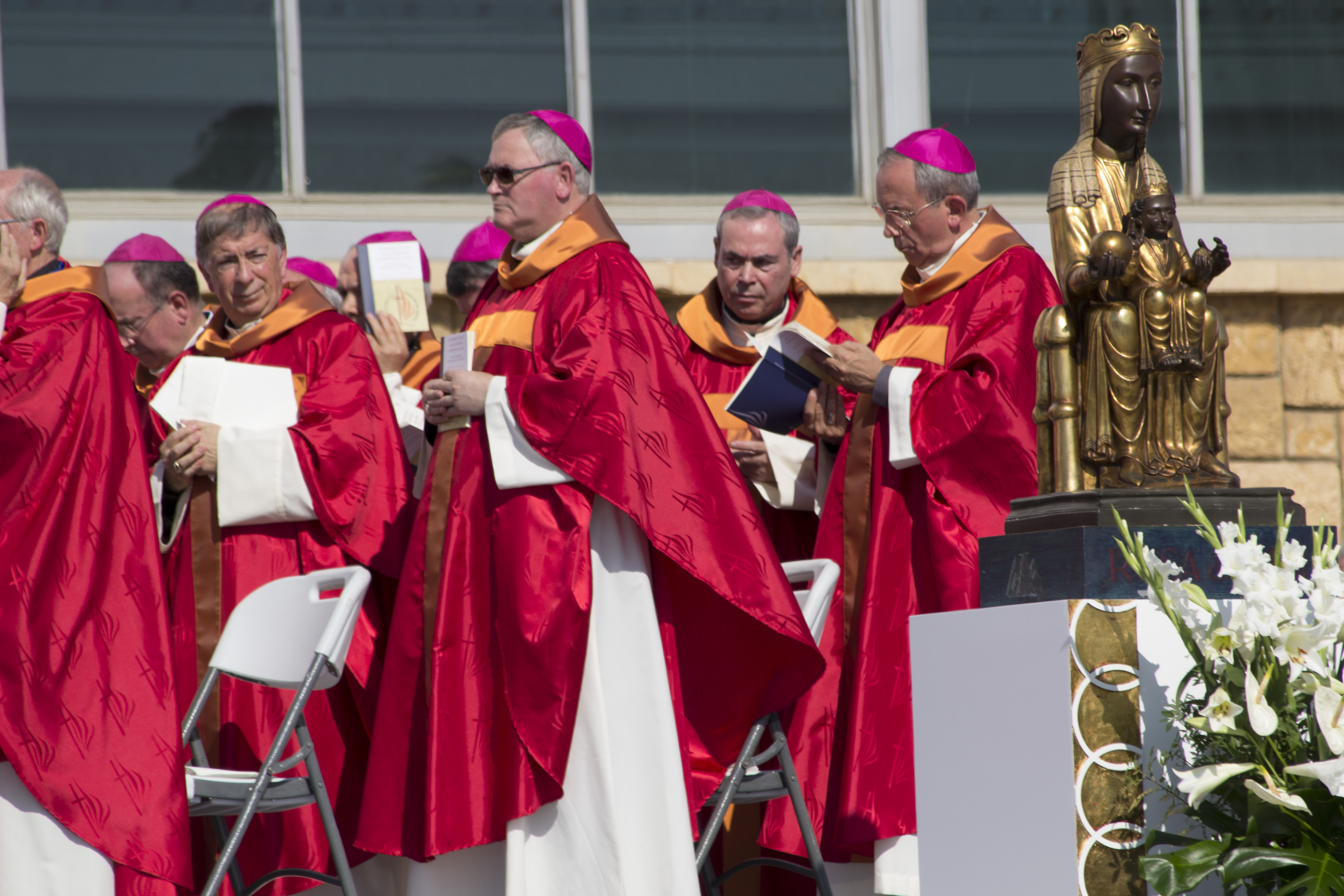
The Liturgy was presided in the pope's name by Cardinal Angelo Amato in Tarragona, Spain

The 522 Spanish Martyrs were victims of the Spanish Civil War beatified by the Roman Catholic Church on 13 October 2013 by order of Pope Francis. It was one of the largest number of persons ever beatified in a single ceremony in the Church's 2000-year history. They originated from all parts of Spain. Their ages ranged from 18 to 86 years old.

== Ceremony ==
The Liturgy was presided in the pope's name by Cardinal Angelo Amato in Complex Educatiu, Tarragona, Spain. One-third of those beatified served in the Diocese of Tarragona, that is, one hundred forty-seven martyrs, including auxiliary bishop, Manuel Borrás and sixty-six diocesan priests.

== Individual fates ==
The 522 martyrs include three bishops, 82 diocesan priests, three seminarians, 15 priests who belonged to the Brotherhood of Diocesan Priest Workers, 412 religious, and seven laity. They were from all parts of Spain, as well as Colombia, Cuba, the Philippines, and Portugal. The largest group (147) came from Tarragona. L’Osservatore Romano noted that some martyrs were killed in Asturia in 1934, two years before the Spanish Civil War began. The youngest was Jose Sanchez Rodriguez, a Carmelite novice, who was 18 years of age when he was killed against the wall of a cemetery in Madrid at dawn on August 18, 1936. The oldest, Servite Sister Aurora Lopez Gonzalez, was executed aged 86.

== The 33 Causes ==
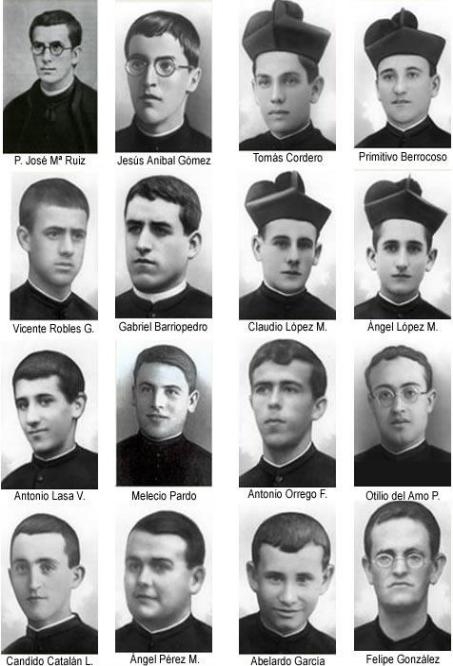
Some of the martyrs pictured.

The 522 martyrs were advanced in 33 separate causes :

- Mariano Alcala Perez and 18 Companions from the Mercedarian Province of Aragon
- Manuel Basulto Jimenez, Bishop of Jaén, and 5 Companions from the Diocesan clergy and lay faithful of Jaen
- Manuel Borras Ferre and 146 Companions from the clergy and religious of the Archdiocese of Tarragona
- Raymundo Joaquín Castano Gonzalez, professed priest, Dominican
- José María Gonzalez Solis, professed priest, Dominican
- Melchora Adoración Cortes Bueno and 14 Companions from the Daughters of Charity of Saint Vincent de Paul in the Archdiocese of Madrid
- Antonio Faundez Lopez and 3 Companions, Friars Minor and clergy of the Diocese of Cartagena
- Teófilo Fernandez de Legaria Goni and 4 Companions, members of the Congregation of the Sacred Hearts of Jesus and Mary (Picpus)
- Ricardo Gil Barcelon, professed priest, member of the Sons of Divine Providence
- Antonio Isidoro Arrue Peiro, layman of the archdiocese of Valencia; postulant, Sons of Divine Providence
- Crisanto Gonzalez Garcia, Aquilino Baro Riera, Cipriano José Iglesias Banuelos, Guzmán Becerril Merino and 64 companions, Marist Brothers of the Schools from the Dioceses of Madrid and Cuenca
- María Asumpta Gonzalez Trujillano and 2 Companions, Franciscan Missionaries of the Mother of the Divine Shepherd
- José Xavier Gorosterratzu Jaunarena and 5 Companions, Redemptorists of Cuenca
- Joseph Guardiet Pujol, priest of the Archdiocese of Barcelona
- Joan Huguet Cardona, priest of the Diocese of Minorca
- Salvi Huix Miralpéix, Bishop of Lleida, Oratorian;
- Mauricio Iniguez de Heredia Alzola, and 23 Companions from the Hospitallers of Saint John of God of Madrid, Barcelona, Valencia and Malaga
- Hermenegildo Iza Aregita of the Assumption and 5 Companions from the Trinitarians of Ciudad Real
- Joaquín Jovani Marin and 14 Companions from the Diocesan Worker Priests of Sacred Heart of Jesus
- Alberto María Marco Aleman, Agustín María Garcia Tribaldos and 23 Companions from the Carmelites of the Ancient Observance and the De La Salle Brothers of Madrid
- Josefa Martines Perez and 12 Companions from the Daughters of Charity of Saint Vincent de Paul and lay faithful of Valencia
- José Máximo Moro Briz and 4 Companions from the Diocesan Clergy of Avila
- Carmelo Moyano Linares and 9 Companions, Carmelites of Ancient Observance of Cordoba
- Joseph Nadal Guiu, priest of the Diocese of Lleida
- José Jordan Blecua, priest of the Diocese of Lleida
- Mauro Palazuelos Maruri and 17 Companions from the Benedictine monks of El Pueyo
- Jaume Puig Mirosa and 19 Companions from the Sons of the Holy Family and lay faithful of Catalunya
- José María Ruiz Cano, Jesús Aníbal Gomez y Gomez, Tomás Cordero y Cordero and 13 Companions from Siguenza
- Manuel Sanz Dominguez of the Holy Family, professed priest, Hieronymite
- Orencio Luis Sola Garriga and 19 Companions, along with Antonio Mateo Salamero from De La Salle Brothers, Diocesan Clergy and lay faithful of Madrid
- Victoria Valeverde Gonzalez, professed religious, Calasanzian Institute, Daughters of the Divine Shepherdess
- Fortunato Velasco Tobar and 13 Companions from the Congregation of the Mission (Vincentians)
- Joan of Jesus Vilaregut Farre and 4 Companions from the Discalced Carmelites and the Diocesan Clergy of Urgell
- Mother Aurelia Arambarri Fuente of the Servants of Mary, Ministers of the Sick, was born in Vitoria, Álava, Spain on October 23, 1866. She was appointed Superior of the community of Guanajuato, Mexico, at the time of the Mexican Revolution, and was transferred back to Spain in 1916. By 1934 she suffered from progressive paralysis and lived in the Infirmary of the Motherhouse in Madrid. In July, 1936, the Motherhouse was taken over, and the Sisters had to be dispersed. Mother Aurelia, Sisters Aurora López González, Daría Andiarena Sagaseta, and Augustina Peña Rodríguez were taken in by a family, but were recognized as religious. They died probably on the night of 6 December in Aravaca (Madrid).
- On July 23, 1936, Mother Maria of Montserrat (Josefa Pilar García y Solanas) (64), Mother Margarita of Alacoque of San Ramon, (Raimunda Ors Torrents) (74), Sister Josefa del Purísimo Corazón de Maria (Josefa Panyella and Doménech) (65), Mother Maria of Asuncion (Dolores Vilaseca and Gallego) (65), Sister Trinidad (Teresa Rius and Casas)(61), Sister Maria of San Enrique (Maria Montserrat Ors and Molist) (46), Sister Maria of the Mercedes (Mercedes Mestre Trinché) (47), Sister Filomena of Saint Francis of Paola (Ana Ballesta and Gelmá) (41), and Sister Maria de Jesus (Vicenta Jordá and Martí) (37), of the Minim nuns of the Monastery of Barcelona were killed.
- José María of Manila (Eugenio Sanz-Orozco Mortera), a priest born in the Philippines, was 55 when he was executed on 17 August 1936, in the gardens of the Cuartel de la Montaña, a military building in Madrid.
- Thirty-one Franciscan Capuchins of Madrid, Asturias, Cantabria, Malaga, and Alicante were also among those martyred during the war.

== The 522 Martyrs ==
=== Bishops ===
1. Salvi Huix Miralpeix, Bishop of Lleida (22 December 1877 – 5 August 1936)
2. Manuel Basulto Jiménez, Bishop of Jaén (17 May 1860 – 12 August 1936)
3. Manuel Borràs Ferré, Auxiliary Bishop of Tarragona (9 September 1880 – 12 August 1936)

=== Diocesan Clergy ===
1. Joan Huguet Cardona (28 January 1913 – 23 July 1936)
2. Lluís Janer Riba (4 March 1880 – 23 July 1936)
3. Jaume Sanromá Solé (4 November 1879 – 24 July 1936)
4. José Máximo Moro Briz (29 May 1882 – 24 July 1936)
5. Josep Garriga Ferrer (13 March 1872 – 25 July 1936)
6. Josep Badía Minguella (18 September 1863 – 26 July 1936)
7. Josep Civit Timoneda (21 December 1874 – 26 July 1936)
8. Pau Gili Pedrós (29 January 1912 – 26 July 1936)
9. Francesc Vidal Sanuy (7 September 1867 – 26 July 1936)
10. Josep Masquef Ferré (11 May 1872 – 26 July 1936)
11. Aleix Miquel Rossell (11 October 1882 – 26 July 1936)
12. Pau Roselló Borgueres (9 May 1895 – 26 July 1936)
13. Miquel Vilatimó Costa (24 October 1888 – 26 July 1936)
14. Josep Bru Boronat (16 June 1883 – 27 July 1936)
15. Narcís Felíu Costa (15 January 1877 – 28 July 1936)
16. Rafael Martí Fugueras (4 December 1878 – 30 July 1936)
17. Sebastià Tarragó Cabré (21 July 1879 – 1 August 1936)
18. Francesc Company Torrelles (23 October 1886 – 2 August 1936)
19. Josep Guardiet Pujol (21 June 1879 – 3 August 1936)
20. Francesc Mercader Rendé (25 March 1881 – 4 August 1936)
21. Josep Colom Alsina (C. August 1906 – 4 August 1936)
22. Pau Virgili Monfá (8 August 1869 – 5 August 1936)
23. Joan Gibert Galofré (15 May 1880 – 5 August 1936)
24. Lluís Domingo Mariné (10 March 1911 – 5 August 1936)
25. Pau Bertrán Mercadé (25 January 1875 – 6 August 1936)
26. Francesc Vives Antich (22 March 1876 – 6 August 1936)
27. Lluís Sans Viñas (18 June 1887 – 10 August 1936)
28. Félix Pérez Portela (21 February 1895 – 12 August 1936)
29. Josep Nadal Guiu (25 July 1911 – 12 August 1936)
30. Josep Jordán Blecua (27 May 1906 – 12 August 1936)
31. Pau Figuerola Rovira (9 December 1870 – 12 August 1936)
32. Ramon Martí Amenós (1 November 1905 – 12 August 1936)
33. Antoni Nogués Martí (20 February 1876 – 12 August 1936)
34. Joan Rofes Sancho (28 February 1876 – 12 August 1936)
35. Josep Maria Sancho Toda (20 March 1909 – 12 August 1936)
36. Ramon Artiga Aragonés (11 October 1880 – 13 August 1936)
37. Pere Rofes Llauradó (31 May 1909 – 13 August 1936)
38. Andreu Prats Barrufet (7 August 1886 – 13 August 1936)
39. José García Librán (19 August 1909 – 14 August 1936)
40. Jocund Bonet Mercadé (10 March 1875 – 14 August 1936)
41. Agustì Ibarra Angüela (2 March 1911 – 15 August 1936)
42. Juan Mesonero Huerta (12 September 1913 – 15 August 1936)
43. Joan Ceró Cedó (20 October 1908 – 15 August 1936)
44. Magí Civit Roca (4 July 1871 – 17 August 1936)
45. Miquel Rué Gené (13 December 1909 – 17 August 1936)
46. Josep Mañé March (24 October 1876 – 17 August 1936)
47. Damián Gómez Jiménez (12 February 1871 – 19 August 1936)
48. Antoni Pedró Minguella (22 March 1874 – 19 August 1936)
49. Magí Albaigés Escoda (23 May 1889 – 20 August 1936)
50. Pau Segalà Solé (18 October 1903 – 20 August 1936)
51. Joan Vernet Masip (28 May 1899 – 21 August 1936)
52. Joan Farriol Sabaté (3 October 1868 – 22 August 1936)
53. Josep Roselló Sans (24 September 1883 – 22 August 1936)
54. Dalmau Llebaría Torné (5 October 1877 – 22 August 1936)
55. Estanislau Sans Hortoneda (8 June 1887 – 23 August 1936)
56. Isidre Torres Balsells (27 November 1874 – 24 August 1936)
57. Pere Farrés Valls (13 May 1903 – 25 August 1936)
58. Miguel Grau Antolí (22 November 1869 – 25 August 1936)
59. Josep Maria Panadés Terré (4 September 1872 – 25 August 1936)
60. Antoni Prenafeta Soler (7 April 1875 – 25 August 1936)
61. Agustín Bermejo Miranda (10 April 1904 – 28 August 1936)
62. Francisco López Navarrete (2 March 1892 – 28 August 1936)
63. Joan Tomás Gibert (18 November 1902 – 28 August 1936)
64. Isidre Fábregas Gils (7 January 1878 – 28 August 1936)
65. Jaume Tarragó Iglesias (19 December 1868 – 28 August 1936)
66. Eladi Peres Bori (26 April 1883 – 28 August 1936)
67. Joaquim Balcells Bosch (16 September 1900 – 3 September 1936)
68. Pius Salvans Corominas (2 January 1878 – 3 September 1936)
69. Pedro Sánchez Barba (1 June 1895 – 4 September 1936)
70. Tomàs Capdevila Miquel (22 January 1903 – 6 September 1936)
71. Josep Padrell Navarro (8 March 1898 – 8 September 1936)
72. Fulgencio Martínez García (14 August 1911 – 4 October 1936)
73. Agapit Gorgues Manresa (4 June 1913 – 23 October 1936)
74. Josep Maria Bru Ralduá (27 October 1870 – 11 November 1936)
75. Joan Roca Vilardell (13 August 1905 – 11 November 1936)
76. Miquel Saludes Ciuret (26 April 1867 – 11 November 1936)
77. Francisco Solís Pedrajas (9 July 1877 – 3 April 1937)
78. Josep Mestre Escoda (12 February 1899 – 17 March 1937)
79. Enric Gispert Domenech (8 November 1879 – 6 April 1937)
80. Josep Gomis Martorell (17 December 1894 – 6 April 1937)
81. Jeroni Fábregas Camí (5 December 1910 – 20 January 1939)

=== Seminarians ===
1. Manuel Aranda Espejo (22 March 1916 – 8 August 1936)
2. Josep Gasol Montseny (31 March 1915 – 12 February 1937)
3. Joan Montpeó Masip (31 October 1918 – 15 May 1938)

=== Roman Catholic Laity ===
1. Lucrecia García Solanas (15 August 1866 – 23 July 1936)
2. Julián Aguilar Martín (24 November 1912 – 29 July 1936)
3. Sebastià Llorens Telarroja (2 December 1909 – 30 July 1936)
4. José Gorastazu Labayen (30 December 1907 – 28 August 1936)
5. José María Poyatos Ruiz (20 October 1914 – 30 October 1936)
6. Dolores Broseta Bonet (c. 1892 – 9 December 1936)
7. Ramón Emiliano Hortelano Gómez (8 August 1908 – 28 July 1938)

=== Order of the Blessed Virgin Mary of Mercy (Mercedarians) ===
1. Enric Morante Chic (23 September 1896 – 25 July 1936)
2. Jesús Eduard Massanet Flaquer (16 January 1899 – 25 July 1936)
3. Amancio Marín Mínguez (26 March 1908 – 26 July 1936)
4. José Trallero Lou (28 December 1903 – 5 August 1936)
5. Jaume Codina Casellas (3 May 1901 – 5 August 1936)
6. Tomás Carbonell Miquel (20 December 1888 – 7 August 1936)
7. Francisco Gargallo Gascón (24 February 1872 – 7 August 1936)
8. Manuel Sancho Aguilar (16 January 1874 – 7 August 1936)
9. Mariano Pina Turón (13 April 1867 – 8 August 1936)
10. Antonio Mateo Salamero (24 September 1864 – 9 August 1936)
11. Antonio González Penín (1 March 1864 – 10 August 1936)
12. Josep Reñé Prenafeta (15 June 1903 – 16 August 1936)
13. Tomás Campo Marín (23 January 1879 – 20 August 1936)
14. Francesc Llagostera Bonet (30 August 1883 – 20 August 1936)
15. Serapio Sanz Iranzo (1 October 1879 – 20 August 1936)
16. Pedro Esteban Hernandez (27 July 1869 – c. September 1936)
17. Antonio Lahoz Gan (22 October 1858 – c. September 1936)
18. Mariano Alcalá Pérez (11 May 1867 – 15 September 1936)
19. Francesc Mitjá I Mitjá (26 June 1864 – c. October 1936)
20. Lorenzo Moreno Nicolás (24 March 1899 – 3 November 1936)

=== Servants of Mary, Ministers of the Sick ===
1. Anunciación (Agustina) Peña Rodríguez (23 March 1900 – 5 December 1936)
2. Clementina (Aurelia) Arambarri Fuente (23 October 1866 – 7 December 1936)
3. Justa (Aurora) López González (28 May 1850 – 7 December 1936)
4. Engrecia (Daría) Andiarena Sagaseta (5 April 1879 – 7 December 1936)

=== Order of Preachers (Dominicans) ===
1. Raimundo Joaquín Castaño González (20 August 1865 – 3 October 1936)
2. José María González Solís (15 January 1877 – 3 October 1936)

=== Order of Saint Jerome (Hieronymites) ===
1. Manuel (of the Holy Family) Sanz Domínguez, restorer of the Order, (31 December 1887 – between 6 and 8 November 1936)

=== Daughters of Charity of Saint Vincent de Paul ===
1. Melchora Adoración Cortés Bueno (4 May 1894 – 12 August 1936)
2. María Severina Díaz-Pardo Gauna (23 October 1895 – 12 August 1936)
3. Estefanía Saldaña Mayoral (31 August 1873 – 12 August 1936)
4. María Dolores Barroso Villaseñor (4 October 1896 – 12 August 1936)
5. María Asunción Mayoral Peña (19 August 1879 – 12 August 1936)
6. Juana Pérez Abascal (20 October 1886 – 12 August 1936)
7. Ramona Cao Fernández (11 September 1883 – 12 August 1936)
8. Rosario Ciércoles Gascón (5 October 1873 – 18 August 1936)
9. Micaela Hernán Martínez (6 May 1881 – 18 August 1936)
10. María Luisa Bermúdez Ruiz (10 October 1893 – 18 August 1936)
11. Dolores Úrsula Caro Martín (21 October 1893 – 3 September 1936)
12. Concepción Pérez Giral (10 January 1887 – 3 September 1936)
13. Andrea Calle González (26 February 1902 – 3 September 1936)
14. Martina Vázquez Gordo (30 January 1865 – 4 October 1936)
15. Josefa Martínez Pérez (5 August 1897 – 15 October 1936)
16. Joaquina Rey Aguirre (23 December 1895 – 29 October 1936)
17. Victoria Arregui Guinea (19 December 1894 – 29 October 1936)
18. Modesta Moro Briz (11 July 1901 – 31 October 1936)
19. Pilar Isabel Sánchez Suárez (5 November 1906 – 31 October 1936)
20. Lorenza Díaz Bolaños (10 August 1896 – 17 November 1936)
21. Josefa Gironés Arteta (11 March 1907 – 17 November 1936)
22. Josefa Laborra Goyeneche (6 February 1864 – 9 December 1936)
23. Carmen Rodríguez Banazal (26 March 1876 – 9 December 1936)
24. Estefanía Irisarri Irigaray (26 December 1878 – 9 December 1936)
25. María Pilar Nalda Franco (24 May 1871 – 9 December 1936)
26. Isidora Izquierdo García (2 January 1885 – 9 December 1936)
27. Gaudencia Benavides Herrero (12 February 1878 – 11 February 1937)

=== Congregation of the Mission (Vincentians) ===
1. Tomás Pallarés Ibáñez (6 March 1890 – 13 October 1934)
2. Salustiano González Crespo (1 May 1871 – 13 October 1934)
3. Luis Aguirre Bilbao (13 September 1914 – 30 July 1936)
4. Leoncio Pérez Nebreda (18 March 1895 – 2 August 1936)
5. Andrés Avelino Gutiérrez Moral (11 November 1886 – 3 August 1936)
6. Antoni Carmaniú Mercarder (17 August 1860 – 17 August 1936)
7. Fortunato Velasco Tobar (31 May 1906 – 24 August 1936)
8. Ricardo Atanes Castro (5 August 1875 – 14 August 1936)
9. Pelayo José Granado Prieto (30 July 1895 – 27 August 1936)
10. Amado García (29 April 1903 – 24 October 1936)
11. Ireneo Rodríguez González (10 February 1879 – 6 December 1936)
12. Gregorio Cermeño Barceló (9 May 1874 – 6 December 1936)
13. Vicente Vilumbrales Fuente (5 April 1909 – 6 December 1936)
14. Narciso Pascual y Pascual (11 August 1917 – 6 December 1936)

=== Order of Friars Minor (Franciscans) ===
1. Baltasar Mariano (Buenaventura) Muñoz Martínez (7 December 1912 – 4 September 1936)
2. Miguel (Antonio) Faúndez López (23 July 1907 – 19 September 1936)

=== Calasanzian Institute, Daughters of the Divine Shepherdess ===
1. Francisca Inés (Victoria) Valverde González (20 April 1888 – 13 January 1937)

=== Franciscan Missionaries of the Mother of the Divine Shepherd ===
1. María Del Consuelo (Isabel) Remuiñán Carracedo (17 June 1876 – 7 July 1936)
2. Dorotea (Gertrudis) Llamazares Fernández (6 February 1870 – 14 July 1936)
3. Juliana (María Asumpta) González Trujillano (19 June 1881 – 28 October 1936)

=== Congregation of the Sacred Hearts of Jesus and Mary (Picpus) ===
1. Leoncio (Eladio) López Ramos (16 November 1904 – 8 August 1936)
2. Benjamín (Teofilo) Fernández De Legaria Goñi (5 July 1898 – 11 August 1936)
3. Luis (Mario) Ros Ezcurra (30 April 1910 – 15 August 1936)
4. Fortunato (Gonzalo) Barrón Nanclares (20 October 1899 – 2 September 1936)
5. Juan (Isidro) Iñiguez De Ciriano Abechuco (8 March 1901 – 2 October 1936)

=== Order of the Most Holy Trinity (Trinitarians) ===
1. Hermenegildo (of the Assumption) Iza Aregita (13 April 1879 – 27 August 1936)
2. Buenaventura (of Saint Catherine) Gabika-Etxebarria Gerrikabeitia (14 July 1887 – 27 August 1936)
3. Francisco (of Saint Lawrence) Euba Gorroño (25 July 1889 – 27 August 1936)
4. Plácido (of Jesus) Camino Fernández (6 May 1890 – 27 August 1936)
5. Juan Antonio (of Jesus Mary) Salútregui Iribarren (5 February 1902 – 27 August 1936)
6. Esteban (of Saint Joseph) Barrenechea Arriaga (26 December 1880 – 27 August 1936)

=== Order of Minims (Minim Nuns) ===
1. Josefa (María Montserrat) Pilar García Solanas (8 March 1871 – 23 July 1936)
2. Ramona Ors Torrents (Margarida d’alacoque Of Saint Raymond) (28 October 1862 – 23 July 1936)
3. Dolors Vilaseca Gallego (Maria de l’Assumpciò) (19 June 1871 – 23 July 1936)
4. Mercè Mestre Trinché (Maria Mercè) (18 June 1889 – 23 July 1936)
5. Vicenta Jordá Martí (María de Jesús) (6 March 1889 – 23 July 1936)
6. Josepa Panyella Doménech (Josepa of the Heart oOf Mary) (7 January 1865 – 23 July 1936)
7. Teresa (Trinitat) Ríus Casas (17 November 1875 – 23 July 1936)
8. Maria Montserrat (Enriqueta) Ors Molist (10 November 1890 – 23 July 1936)
9. Ana Ballesta Gelmá (Filomena of Saint Francis de Paola) (28 September 1895 – 23 July 1936)

=== Sons of Divine Providence (Orionists) ===
1. Ricardo Gil Barcelón (27 October 1873 – 3 August 1936)
2. Antonio Isidoro Arrué Peiró (4 April 1908 – 3 August 1936)

=== Congregation of the Most Holy Redeemer (Redemptorists) ===
1. José Xavier Gorosterratzu Jaunarena (7 August 1877 – 10 August 1936)
2. Victoriano Calvo Lozano (23 December 1896 – 10 August 1936)
3. Ciriaco Olarte Pérez de Mendiguren (8 February 1893 – 31 July 1936)
4. Miguel Goñi Ariz (27 April 1902 – 31 July 1936)
5. Julián Pozo Ruiz de Samaniego (1 January 1903 – 9 August 1936)
6. Pedro Romero Espejo (28 April 1871 – 4 July 1938)

=== Order of the Brothers of the Blessed Virgin Mary of Mount Carmel (Carmelites of the Ancient Observance) ===
1. José María Mateos Carballido (19 March 1902 – 22 July 1936)
2. Juan (Eliseo María) Durán Cintas (25 November 1906 – 22 July 1936)
3. Ramón María Pérez Sousa (1 August 1903 – 22 July 1936)
4. Jaime María Carretero Rojas (27 April 1911 – 22 July 1936)
5. José María González Delgado (26 February 1908 – 27 July 1936)
6. Pedro Velasco Narbona (12 October 1892 – C. July 1936)
7. Antonio María Martín Povea (27 November 1887 – 14 August 1936)
8. Eliseo María Camargo Montes (4 June 1887 – 18 August 1936)
9. José María Ruiz Cardeñosa (26 July 1902 – 18 August 1936)
10. Daniel (Daniel María) García Antón (11 December 1913 – 18 August 1936)
11. Silvano (Silvano María) Villanueva González (6 February 1916 – 18 August 1936)
12. Adalberto (Adalberto María) Vicente Vicente (23 April 1916 – 18 August 1936)
13. Aurelio (Aurelio María) García Anton (14 August 1916 – 18 August 1936)
14. Francisco (Francisco María) Pérez Pérez (30 January 1917 – 18 August 1936)
15. Angelo (Angelo María) Reguilón Lobato (1 June 1917 – 18 August 1936)
16. Nicomedes (Bartolomé Fanti María) Andrés Vecilla (26 August 1917 – 18 August 1936)
17. José (Ángel María) Sánchez Rodríguez (2 August 1918 – 18 August 1936)
18. Crispulo (Carmelo María) Moyano Linares (10 June 1891 – 23 September 1936)
19. Francisco Marco (Alberto María) Alemán (23 May 1894 – 18 November 1936)

=== Order of the Discalced Brothers of the Blessed Virgin Mary of Mount Carmel (Discalced Carmelites) ===
1. Joan (of Jesus) Vilaregut Farré (19 August 1907 – 24 July 1936)
2. Josep Olivé Vivó (Bartomeu of the Passion) (14 September 1894 – 24 July 1936)
3. Joan Fort Rius (Àngel of Saint Joseph) (10 October 1896 – 25 July 1936)
4. Vicente Gallen Ybañez (Vicente of the Cross) (29 September 1908 – 25 July 1936)
5. Carles Barrufet Tost (Carles of Jesus Mary) (9 April 1888 – 12 August 1936)
6. Jaume Perucho Fontarro (Silveri of Saint Aloysius Gonzaga) (12 March 1864 – 20 August 1936)
7. Francesc (of the Assumption) Segalà Solé (25 May 1912 – 20 August 1936)
8. José (Cecilio of Jesus Mary) Alberich Lluch (7 February 1865 – 11 November 1936)
9. Felipe Arce Fernández (Elipio of Saint Rose) (16 October 1878 – 11 November 1936)
10. Pedro (of Saint Elijah) De Eriz Eguiluz (22 February 1877 – 11 November 1936)
11. Damián (of the Holy Trinity) Rodríguez Pablo (18 May 1896 – 11 November 1936)

=== Carmelite Tertiaries of Education ===
1. Julio Alameda Camarero (28 May 1911 – 11 November 1936)
2. Lluís Domingo Oliva (11 January 1892 – 11 November 1936)
3. Isidre Tarsá Giribets (3 February 1866 – 11 November 1936)
4. Bonaventura Toldrà Rodon (31 March 1896 – 11 November 1936)

=== Brothers of the Christian Schools (De La Salle Brothers) ===
1. Vicente (Virginio Pedro) López López (27 October 1884 – 20 July 1936)
2. Joaquin (Ireneo Jacinto) Rodríguez Bueno (20 August 1910 – 22 July 1936)
3. Ignacio (Rogaciano) González Calzada (31 July 1885 – 24 July 1936)
4. Eugenio (Agustín María) García Tribaldos (13 July 1877 – 30 July 1936)
5. Guillermo (Oseas) Álvarez Quemada (10 February 1890 – 30 July 1936)
6. Miguel (Anselmo Pablo) Solas Del Val (8 May 1890 – 30 July 1936)
7. Alejandro (Braulio José) González Blanco (23 July 1890 – 30 July 1936)
8. Alejandro (Alejandro Antonio) Arraya Caballero (29 May 1908 – 30 July 1936)
9. Bernabé (Alfeo Bernabé) Núñez Alonso (11 June 1902 – 30 July 1936)
10. Pablo (Norberto José) Díaz De Zárate Ortiz De Zárate (21 January 1892 – 30 July 1936)
11. Juan (Crisólogo) Lanz Palanca (11 August 1880 – 30 July 1936)
12. Luis (Esteban Vicente) Herrero Arnillas (22 August 1893 – 30 July 1936)
13. Patricio (Alejo Andrés) Beobide Cendoya (15 May 1889 – 3 August 1936)
14. Eleuterio (Eleuterio Roman) Mancho López (20 February 1898 – 3 August 1936)
15. Joan Baptista (Benet Joan) Urgell Coma (5 October 1906 – 7 August 1936)
16. Jaume (Fulbert Jaume) Jardí Vernet (7 May 1901 – 10 August 1936)
17. Pedro José (Arístides Marcos) Cano Cebrían (1 June 1906 – 12 August 1936)
18. Gabriel (Justí Gabriel) Albiol Plou (23 April 1910 – 12 August 1936)
19. Ildefonso (Luis Alberto) Alberto Flos (26 February 1880 – 15 August 1936)
20. Miguel (Exuperio) Alberto Flos (12 November 1881 – 15 August 1936)
21. Clemente (Clemente Adolfo) Vea Balaguer (9 June 1898 – 15 August 1936)
22. Patricio (Rafaél José) Gellida Llorach (16 March 1871 – 18 August 1936)
23. Fermín (Alejandro Juan) Gellida Cornelles (6 October 1889 – 18 August 1936)
24. Pascual (Marciano Pascual) Escuin Ferrer (30 March 1907 – 19 August 1936)
25. Andrés (Andrés Sergio) Pradas Lahoz (30 November 1908 – 19 August 1936)
26. Francesc (Benild Josep) Casademunt Ribas (5 February 1872 – 26 August 1936)
27. Pere (Elm Miquel) Sisterna Torrent (21 March 1878 – 26 August 1936)
28. Josep Maria (Faust Lluís) Tolaguera Oliva (14 March 1904 – 26 August 1936)
29. Antonio (Orencio Luis) Solá Garriga (20 February 1898 – 28 August 1936)
30. Celestino (Aquilino Javier) Ruiz Alegre (6 April 1902 – 28 August 1936)
31. Germán (Ángel Gregorio) Arribas y Arribas (28 May 1895 – 28 August 1936)
32. Manoel José (Mario Félix) Sousa de Sousa (27 December 1860 – 28 August 1936)
33. Joaquim (Artur) Oliveras Puljarás (15 February 1875 – 28 August 1936)
34. Andrés (Sixto Andrés) Merino Báscones (10 November 1874 – 28 August 1936)
35. Lázaro (Crisóstomo Albino) Ruiz Peral (20 January 1909 – 28 August 1936)
36. Graciliano (Benjamín León) Ortega Narganes (12 August 1905 – 28 August 1936)
37. Teodoro (Mariano Pablo) Pérez Gómez (7 January 1913 – 28 August 1936)
38. Evencio (Javier Eliseo) Castellanos López (13 January 1912 – 28 August 1936)
39. Josep (Jacint Jordi) Camprubí Corrubí (22 February 1888 – 28 August 1936)
40. Cesáreo (Eladio Vicente) España Ortiz (25 February 1886 – 28 August 1936)
41. Modest (Anselm Fèlix) Godo Buscato (12 January 1879 – 28 August 1936)
42. Modest (Agapit Modest) Pamplona Falguera (17 June 1907 – 28 August 1936)
43. Javier (Elías Paulino) Pradas Vidal (20 March 1896 – 28 August 1936)
44. Nicolás (Daniel Antonino) Rueda Barriocanal (10 September 1894 – 28 August 1936)
45. Alberto José (Junián Alberto) Larrazábal Michelena (4 February 1893 – 30 August 1936)
46. Eleuterio (Luis Victorio) Angulo Ayala (14 December 1894 – 30 August 1936)
47. Manuel (Claudio José) Mateo Calvo (5 October 1902 – 1 September 1936)
48. Maximiano (Ángel Amado) Fierro Pérez (21 August 1905 – 1 September 1936)
49. Pio (Buenaventura Pio) Ruiz de la Torre (9 July 1909 – 1 September 1936)
50. Joaquim (Leonci Joaquim) Pallerola Feu (2 July 1892 – 1 September 1936)
51. Francesc (Hug Bernabé) Trullen Gilisbarts (20 January 1895 – 1 September 1936)
52. Pedro (Anastasio Pedro) Bruch Cotacáns (30 June 1869 – 14 September 1936)
53. Herman José (Clemente Faustino) Fernández Sáenz (6 April 1915 – 19 September 1936)
54. Lucas (Anastasio Lucas) Martín Puente (20 September 1908 – 19 September 1936)
55. Sebastián (Honorio Sebastián) Obeso Alario (12 December 1910 – 19 September 1936)
56. Juan (Nicolás Adriano) Pérez Rodrigo (27 January 1914 – 19 September 1936)
57. Antonio (Antonio Gil) Gil Monforte (9 February 1903 – 22 September 1936)
58. Francisco (Félix Adriano) Vicente Edo (31 July 1903 – 22 September 1936)
59. Arsenio (Augusto María) Merino Miguel (12 December 1884 – 29 October 1936)
60. Maximino (José Alfonso) Serrano Sáiz (29 May 1887 – 8 November 1936)
61. Mariano (Jenaro) Navarro Blasco (3 December 1903 – 11 November 1936)
62. Josep Boschdemont Mitjavila (Gilberto de Jesús) (11 August 1880 – 11 November 1936)
63. Juan Antonio (Daciano) de Bengoa Larriñaga (17 January 1882 – 27 November 1936)
64. Ramiro (Vidal Ernesto) Frías García (13 March 1906 – 28 November 1936)
65. Manuel Miguel (Sinfronio) Sánchez (29 July 1876 – 30 November 1936)
66. Saturnino (Pablo De La Cruz) Sanz y Sanz (9 April 1879 – 30 November 1936)
67. Gregorio (Juan Pablo) Álvarez Fernández (9 May 1904 – 30 November 1936)
68. Emiliano (Floriano Félix) Santamaría Angulo (8 August 1899 – 30 November 1936)
69. Vicente (Adalberto Juan) Angulo García (22 January 1904 – 30 November 1936)
70. Martín (Ismael Ricardo) Arbé Barrón (1 January 1906 – 30 November 1936)
71. Joan (Arnal Ciril) Font Taulat (1 July 1890 – 23 January 1937)
72. Juan Lucas (Braulio Carlos) Manzanares (10 December 1913 – 23 February 1937)
73. Alberto (Alberto Joaquín) Linares De La Pinta (27 August 1913 – 19 May 1937)
74. Francesc (Pere Magí) Salla Saltó (3 September 1918 – 30 July 1938)

=== Congregation of Missionary Sons of the Immaculate Heart of the Blessed Virgin Mary (Claretians) ===
1. Antoni Capdevilla Balsells (27 February 1894 – 24 July 1936)
2. José María Ruiz Cano (13 September 1906 – 27 July 1936)
3. Jesús Aníbal Gómez Gómez (13 June 1914 – 28 July 1936)
4. Tomás Cordero Cordero (8 June 1910 – 28 July 1936)
5. Primitivo Berrocoso Maillo (19 February 1913 – 28 July 1936)
6. Vicente Robles Gómez (25 April 1914 – 28 July 1936)
7. Gabriel Barriopedro Tejedor (18 March 1883 – 28 July 1936)
8. Claudio López Martínez (18 December 1910 – 28 July 1936)
9. Angel López Martínez (2 October 1912 – 28 July 1936)
10. Antonio Lasa Vidauretta (28 June 1913 – 28 July 1936)
11. Melecio Pardo Llorente (3 August 1913 – 28 July 1936)
12. Antonio Orrego Fuentes (15 January 1915 – 28 July 1936)
13. Otilio Del Amo Palomino (2 April 1913 – 28 July 1936)
14. Cándido Catalán Lasala (16 February 1916 – 28 July 1936)
15. Angel Pérez Murillo (6 January 1915 – 28 July 1936)
16. Abelardo García Palacios (15 October 1913 – 28 July 1936)
17. Jaume Mir Vime (21 December 1889 – 29 July 1936)
18. Sebastià Balcells Tonijuan (3 December 1885 – 15 August 1936)
19. Antoni Vilamassana Carulla (27 January 1860 – 25 August 1936)
20. Pau Castellá Barberá (3 May 1860 – 26 September 1936)
21. Andreu Felíu Bartomeu (15 September 1870 – 26 September 1936)
22. Felipe González de Heredia Barahona (26 May 1889 – 2 October 1936)
23. Frederíc Vila Bartolì (3 March 1884 – 11 November 1936)

=== Congregation of the Sons of the Holy Family of Jesus, Mary and Joseph (Sons of the Holy Family) ===
1. Jaume Puig Mirosa (3 June 1908 – 30 July 1936)
2. Narcís Sitjà Basté (1 November 1867 – 9 August 1936)
3. Joan Cuscó Oliver (6 May 1872 – 21 August 1936)
4. Pere Sadurní Raventós (22 April 1883 – 21 August 1936)
5. Fermí Martorell Vies (3 November 1879 – 25 August 1936)
6. Francesc Llach Candell (7 December 1889 – 25 August 1936)
7. Eduard Cabanach Majem (31 December 1908 – 25 August 1936)
8. Ramon Cabanach Majem (22 September 1911 – 25 August 1936)
9. Joan Franquesa Costa (19 September 1867 – 2 September 1936)
10. Segimon Sagalés Vilá (1 May 1888 – 8 September 1936)
11. Josep Vila Barri (14 April 1910 – 21 September 1936)
12. Pere Verdaguer Saurina (24 October 1908 – 15 October 1936)
13. Robert Montserrat Beliart (17 June 1911 – 13 November 1936)
14. Antonio Mascaró Colomina (12 March 1913 – 27 January 1937)
15. Pedro Ruiz Ortega (14 January 1912 – 4 March 1937)
16. Pere Roca Toscas (7 October 1916 – 4 March 1937)
17. Ramon Llach Candell (24 May 1875 – 19 April 1937)
18. Jaume Llach Candell (1 October 1878 – 19 April 1937)
19. Ramon Oromí Sullà (16 September 1875 – 3 May 1937)

=== Order of Saint Benedict (Benedictines) ===
1. Jaume (Bernat) Vendrell Olivella (29 June 1878 – 25 July 1936)
2. Francesc Maria de Paula Sánchez Solé (25 August 1880 – 25 July 1936)
3. Aleix (Ildefons) Civil Castellví (11 January 1889 – 25 July 1936)
4. Josep Maria Jordá i Jordá (17 November 1884 – 26 July 1936)
5. Vicente Burrel Enjuanes (28 December 1896 – 26 July 1936)
6. Àngel Maria Rodamilans Canals (1 May 1874 – 27 July 1936)
7. Joan (Odiló Maria) Costa Canal (13 December 1905 – 28 July 1936)
8. Pere (Narcís Maria) Vilar Espona (7 August 1916 – 28 July 1936)
9. Lluis (Hildebrand Maria) Casanovas Vila (23 January 1918 – 28 July 1936)
10. Lorenzo Santolaria Ester (20 April 1872 – 5 August 1936)
11. Mariano Sierra Almázor (25 February 1869 – 9 August 1936)
12. Josep Maria Fontseré Masdeú (30 October 1854 – 19 August 1936)
13. Cipriano (Domingo) González Millán (16 September 1880 – 19 August 1936)
14. Joan Roca Bosch (11 July 1884 – 19 August 1936)
15. Agustí (Ambrosi Maria) Busquets Creixell (7 June 1903 – 19 August 1936)
16. Càndid (Placid Maria) Feliu Soler (1 November 1904 – 19 August 1936)
17. José (Eugenio María) Erausquin Aramburu (21 October 1902 – 19 August 1936)
18. Ignasi (Emilià Maria) Guilà Ximenes (15 April 1914 – 19 August 1936)
19. Abel Ángel (Mauro) Palazuelos Maruri (26 October 1903 – 28 August 1936)
20. Antonio (Honorato) Suárez Riu (5 February 1902 – 28 August 1936)
21. Leandro Cuesta Andrés (30 March 1870 – 28 August 1936)
22. Antoni (Raimundo) Lladós Salud (15 December 1881 – 28 August 1936)
23. Lorenzo Sobrevia Cañardo (16 April 1874 – 28 August 1936)
24. Santiago Pardo López (25 July 1881 – 28 August 1936)
25. Fernando Salinas Romeo (31 May 1883 – 28 August 1936)
26. Jaume (Domingo) Caballé Bru (25 May 1883 – 28 August 1936)
27. Antonio (Ángel) Fuertes Boira (2 August 1889 – 28 August 1936)
28. Julio (Ildefonso) Fernández Muñiz (24 June 1897 – 28 August 1936)
29. Mariano (Anselmo) Palau Sin (9 August 1902 – 28 August 1936)
30. Ramón (Ramiro) Sanz De Galdeano Mañeru (30 August 1910 – 28 August 1936)
31. Martín (Rosendo) Donamaría Valencia (3 November 1909 – 28 August 1936)
32. Leoncio (Lorenzo) Ibáñez Caballero (11 September 1911 – 28 August 1936)
33. Ángel Carmelo (Aurelio) Boix Cosials (2 September 1914 – 28 August 1936)
34. León (Luis Gonzaga) Alesanco Maestro (22 May 1882 – 30 November 1936)
35. Luis Palacios Lozano (25 August 1893 – 30 November 1936)
36. Josep (Fulgenci) Albareda Ramoneda (13 June 1888 – 19 December 1936)
37. Joan (Robert) Grau Bullich (14 April 1895 – 5 January 1937)
38. Pere Vallmitjana Abarca (19 May 1875 – 15 February 1937)

=== Diocesan Laborer Priests of the Sacred Heart of Jesus ===
1. Miguel Amaro Rodríguez (8 May 1883 – 2 August 1936)
2. Joan Vallés Anguera (21 December 1872 – 9 August 1936)
3. Mateo Despóns Tena (5 April 1884 – 13 August 1936)
4. Amadeu Monje Altés (10 April 1906 – 16 August 1936)
5. Cristòfol Baqués Almirall (20 March 1885 – 20 August 1936)
6. Josep Maria Tarín Curto (6 February 1892 – 29 August 1936)
7. José Prats Sanjuán (31 July 1874 – 1 September 1936)
8. Lorenzo Insa Celma (18 June 1875 – 2 September 1936)
9. Tomàs Cubells Miguel (25 October 1867 – 10 September 1936)
10. José Piquer Arnáu (27 October 1881 – 11 September 1936)
11. Josep Pla Arasa (16 November 1888 – 11 September 1936)
12. Sebastià Segarra Barberá (28 March 1894 – 5 October 1936)
13. Joaquín Jovaní Marín (16 October 1874 – 5 December 1936)
14. Vicente Jovaní Ávila (5 December 1902 – 5 December 1936)
15. José Manuel Claramonte Agut (6 November 1892 – 10 June 1938)

=== Brothers Hospitallers of Saint John of God (Hospitallers) ===
1. Benito (Gaudencio) Iñiguez de Heredia Alzola (16 April 1882 – 1 August 1936)
2. Ramon (Leonci) Rosell Laboria (13 December 1897 – 11 August 1936)
3. Armando (Jaime) Óscar Valdés (15 January 1891 – 11 August 1936)
4. Silvestre Perez Laguna (30 December 1873 – 17 August 1936)
5. Pedro (Segundo) Pastor García (29 April 1885 – 17 August 1936)
6. Antonio (Baltasar) del Charco Horques (12 November 1887 – 17 August 1936)
7. Manuel (Gumersindo) Sanz y Sanz (1 January 1878 – 17 August 1936)
8. Eusebio (Honorio) Ballesteros Rodríguez (29 April 1895 – 17 August 1936)
9. Juan Antonio (Raimundo) García Moreno (11 April 1896 – 17 August 1936)
10. Isidro Valentín Peña Ojea (Estanislao de Jesús) (4 April 1907 – 17 August 1936)
11. Florentino (Salustiano) Alonso Antonio (14 March 1876 – 17 August 1936)
12. Alejandro (Mauricio) Iñiguez de Heredia Alzola (8 February 1877 – 28 August 1936)
13. Serviliano (Luis Beltrán) Solá Jiménez (20 April 1899 – 28 August 1936)
14. Tomás (Cristobal) Barrios Pérez (25 December 1864 In Palencia (Spain)
15. José (Leandro) Aloy Doménech (16 November 1872 – 4 October 1936)
16. Dionisio (Cruz) Ibáñez López (3 January 1886 – 4 October 1936)
17. Juan (Leopoldo) de Francisco Pío (3 August 1877 – 4 October 1936)
18. Francisco (Feliciano) Martínez Granero (23 January 1863 – 4 October 1936)
19. Juan José Orayen Aizcorbe (11 March 1899 – 4 October 1936)
20. José Miguel Peñarroya Dolz (3 November 1908 – 4 October 1936)
21. Publio Fernández González (24 May 1908 – 4 October 1936)
22. Avelí Martínez de Arenzana Candela (10 January 1899 – 4 October 1936)
23. Primo (Trinidad) Andrés Lanas (7 February 1877 – 5 February 1937)
24. Juan Ramón (Matías) Morín Ramos (6 March 1913 – September 1937)

=== Order of Friors Minor Capuchin (Capuchin Franciscans) ===
1. Miguel Francisco González-Díez González-Núñez (Andrés from Palazuelo) (8 May 1883 – 31 July 1936)
2. Fernando Olmedo Reguera (Fernando from Santiago) (10 January 1873 – 2 August 1936)
3. Geronimo Limón Márquez (Luis from Valencina) (27 March 1885 – 3 August 1936)
4. José González Ramos Campos (Ángel from Cañete La Real) (24 February 1879 – 6 August 1936)
5. Andrés Soto Carrera (Gil from Puerto De Santa Maria) (29 June 1883 – 6 August 1936)
6. José María Recalde Magúregui (Ignacio from Galdácano) (7 February 1912 – 6 August 1936)
7. Alejandro Casare Menéndez (José from Chauchina) (24 February 1897 – 6 August 1936)
8. Juan Silverio Pérez Ruano (Crispín from Cuevas de San Marcos) (27 December 1875 – 6 August 1936)
9. Rafaél Severiano Rodríguez Navarro (Pacifico from Ronda) (8 November 1882 – 7 August 1936)
10. Joaquín Frade Eiras (Berardo from Visantoña) (5 April 1878 – 14 August 1936)
11. Segundo Pérez Arias (Ildefonso from Armellada) (2 May 1874 – 14 August 1936)
12. Ángel de la Red Pérez (Arcángel from Valdavida) (26 February 1882 – 14 August 1936)
13. Basilio González Herrero (Alejo from Terradillos) (14 June 1874 – 14 August 1936)
14. Ezequiél Prieto Otero (Eusebio from Saludes) (19 February 1885 – 14 August 1936)
15. Juan Francisco Barahona Martín (Alejandro from Sobradillo) (10 January 1902 – 15 August 1936)
16. Facundo Escanciano Tejerina (Aurelio from Ocejo) (4 February 1881 – 17 August 1936)
17. Eugenio Sanz-Orozco Mortera (José María from Manila) (5 September 1880 – 17 August 1936)
18. Lorenzo Ilarregui Goñi (Gabriel from Aróstegui) (10 August 1880 – 23 August 1936)
19. Enric Salvá Ministral (Carmel from Colomés) (21 March 1874 – 25 August 1936)
20. Quirino Díez del Blanco (Gregorio from La Mata) (25 March 1889 – 27 August 1936)
21. Emilio Serrano Lizarralde (Saturnino from Bilbao) (25 May 1910 – 26 August 1936)
22. Bernardo Cembranos Nistal (Eustaquio from Villalquite) (20 August 1903 – 31 August 1936)
23. Felipe Llamas Barrero (Domitilo from Ayoó) (3 September 1907 – 6 September 1936)
24. Norberto Cembranos de la Verdura (6 June 1891 – 23 September 1936)
25. Andrés Francisco Simón Gómez (Eloy from Orihuela) (30 November 1876 – 7 November 1936)
26. José Pérez González (Ramiro from Sobradillo) (5 January 1907 – 27 November 1936)
27. Ramón Juan Costa (Honorio from Orihuela(23 November 1888 – 30 November 1936)
28. Ignacio Caselles García (Juan Crisóstomo from Gata de Gorgos) (18 November 1874 – 24 December 1936)
29. Alejo Pan López (Ambrosio from Santibáñez) (24 October 1888 – 27 December 1936)
30. Aproniano de Felipe González (Miguel from Grajal) (2 February 1898 – 29 December 1936)
31. Jacinto Gutiérrez Terciado (Diego from Guadilla) (3 July 1909 – 29 December 1936)
32. Pablo Merillas Fernández (Carlos from Alcubilla De Nogales) (17 July 1902 – 14 January 1937)
33. Lucinio Fontanil Medina (Primitivo from Villamizar) (12 February 1884 – 19 May 1937)

=== Marist Brothers of the Schools (Marists) ===
1. Argimiro (León Argimiro) García Sandoval (31 July 1913 – 20 July 1936)
2. Eugenio (Victorico María) Artola Sorolla (12 April 1894 – 22 July 1936)
3. Trifón (Jerónimo) Tobar Calzada (3 July 1876 – 22 July 1936)
4. Pedro (Marino) Alonso Ortega (14 January 1901 – 22 July 1936)
5. Pablo (Gaspar) Martínez Esteban (24 March 1898 – 24 July 1936)
6. Braulio (Camerino) Álvarez Palacín (27 March 1900 – 24 July 1936)
7. Severino (Feliciano) Ruiz Báscones (2 November 1884 – 29 July 1936)
8. Fermín Zabaleta Armendáriz (24 September 1899 – 29 July 1936)
9. Saturnino (Herminio Pascual) Jaunsarás Zabaleta (11 February 1912 – 29 July 1936)
10. Severino Ruiz Hidalgo (5 November 1907 – 1 August 1936)
11. José (José Teofilo) Mulet Velilla (28 June 1917 – 1 August 1936)
12. Joseph (Luis Damián) Sobraqués Glory (28 March 1891 – 4 August 1936)
13. Elias (Josep Ceferí) Garet Ventejo (28 January 1905 – 4 August 1936)
14. José (Berardo José) Pampliega Santiago (26 August 1912 – 4 August 1936)
15. Luis (Benedicto José) Galerón Parte (13 December 1912 – 4 August 1936)
16. Pedro (Aureliano) Ortigosa Oraá (5 February 1894 – 7 August 1936)
17. Esteve (Millà) Llover Torrent (27 July 1885 – 10 August 1936)
18. José (Benigno José) Valencia Janices (16 November 1906 – 11 August 1936)
19. Manuel (Adrián) Llop Plana (1 January 1896 – 11 August 1936)
20. Julián (Timoteo José) Lisbona Royo (23 October 1891 – 11 August 1936)
21. Marcos (Emiliano José) Leyún Goñi (7 October 1897 – 11 August 1936)
22. Francisco (Andrés José) Donazar Goñi (10 October 1893 – 11 August 1936)
23. Julián (Cipriano José) Iglesias Bañuelos (26 February 1893 – 23 August 1936)
24. Félix-Célestin (Jean-Marie) Gombert Olympe (5 April 1873 – 23 August 1936)
25. Julio (Julio Fermín) Múzquiz Erdozáin (11 April 1899 – 23 August 1936)
26. Jerónimo (Javier Benito) Alonso Fernández (1 October 1912 – 23 August 1936)
27. Ángel (Bruno José) Ayape Remón (1 October 1915 – 23 August 1936)
28. Emiliano (Anacleto Luis) Busto Pérez (5 January 1913 – 23 August 1936)
29. Florencio (Evencio) Pérez Moral (10 October 1899 – 23 August 1936)
30. Luis (Abdón) Iglesias Bañuelos (19 August 1895 – 23 August 1936)
31. Francisco (Eduardo María) Alonso Fontaneda (10 October 1915 – 23 August 1936)
32. Amancio (Felix Amancio) Noriega Nuñez (10 February 1912 – 23 August 1936)
33. Lorenzo (Jorge Luis) Lizasoáin Lizaso (4 September 1886 – 24 August 1936)
34. Luis (Luis Alfonso) Moreno Aliende (24 June 1911 – 26 August 1936)
35. Casimiro (Crisanto) González García (4 March 1897 – 27 August 1936)
36. Pere (Teògenes) Valls Piernau (22 November 1885 – 27 August 1936)
37. Mauro (Luciano) Álvarez Renedo (15 January 1892 – 27 August 1936)
38. José Félix (Pedro Jerónimo) Serret Anglés (20 November 1904 – 27 August 1936)
39. Baldomer (Aquilli) Baró Riera (29 September 1903 – 3 September 1936)
40. Joan (Fabià) Pastor Marco (14 January 1876 – 3 September 1936)
41. Lorenzo (Félix Lorenzo) Gutiérrez Rojo (10 April 1906 – 3 September 1936)
42. Hilario (Ligorio Pedro) de Santiago Paredes (13 May 1912 – 3 September 1936)
43. Restituto (José De Arimatea) Santiago Allende (10 June 1902 – 4 September 1936)
44. Máximo (Justo Pastor) Aranda Modrego (3 August 1907 – 8 September 1936)
45. Maximiano (Alipio José) Dronda Leoz (8 June 1916 – 8 September 1936)
46. Perfecto (Guzmán) Becerril Merino (19 April 1885 – 24 September 1936)
47. Celedonio (Fernando María) Martínez Infante (30 August 1895 – 24 September 1936)
48. Luis (Luis Fermín) Huerta Lara (21 June 1905 – 25 September 1936)
49. Jesús (Valente José) Delgado De La Fuente (17 April 1894 – 5 October 1936)
50. Eloy (Eloy José) Rodríguez Gutiérrez (9 September 1899 – 5 October 1936)
51. Joan (Lluís Daniel) Viñuela Flecha (2 June 1910 – 16 October 1936)
52. Abilio (Roque) Villareal Abaza (22 February 1885 – 18 October 1936)
53. Leonardo (Egberto) Arce Ruiz (6 November 1907 – 23 October 1936)
54. Martín (Teófilo Martín) Erro Ripa (3 March 1914 – 23 October 1936)
55. Aniceto (Ángel Hipólito) Pablos Carvajal (13 May 1903 – 3 November 1936)
56. Marcelino (Julián Marcelino) Rebollar Campo (29 November 1914 – 3 December 1936)
57. Enrique (Benedicto Andrés) Andrés Monfort (25 April 1899 – 7 December 1936)
58. Jaume (Pere) Cortasa Monclús (15 July 1883 – 2 January 1937)
59. Baldomero (Narciso) Arribas Arnaiz (27 February 1877 – 2 January 1937)
60. Henri (Colombanus-Paul) Oza Motinot (1 August 1877 – 2 January 1937)
61. Tesifone (Néstor Eugenio) Ortega Villamudrio (10 April 1912 – 2 January 1937)
62. Euquerio Llanillo García (20 February 1914 – 4 January 1937)
63. Dionís (Domènec Ciríac) Domínguez Martínez (24 January 1911 – 20 April 1937)
64. Vidal (Jorge Camilo) García Y García (7 February 1916 – 21 August 1937)
65. Nemesio (Julián José) Cabria Andrés (5 August 1908 – 28 July 1938)
66. Daniel (Pablo Daniel) Altabella Gracia (19 October 1911 – 29 January 1939)

== See also ==
- Martyrs of Daimiel
- Martyrs of Turon
- 233 Spanish Martyrs
- 498 Spanish Martyrs
