= Salvi Huix Miralpéix =

Catalan Roman Catholic cleric

Blessed Salvi Huix Miralpéix C.O.
- Bishop of Lleida
- Church: Roman Catholic Church
- Diocese: Lleida
- See: Lleida
- Appointed: 28 January 1935
- Installed: 5 May 1935
- Term ended: 5 August 1936
- Predecessor: Manuel Irurita y Almándoz
- Successor: Juan Villar y Sanz
- Previous posts: Titular Bishop of Selymbria (1928-35); Apostolic Administrator of Ibiza (1928-35)

Orders
- Ordination: 19 September 1903 by Josep Torras i Bages
- Consecration: 15 April 1928 by Federico Tedeschini

Personal details
- Born: Salvi Huix Miralpéix; 22 December 1877 Santa Margarida de Vallors, Girona, Spanish Kingdom
- Died: 5 August 1936 (aged 58) Lleida, Second Spanish Republic
- Motto: In Tuo verbo laxabo rete ("At Thy word I will let down the net")

Sainthood
- Feast day: 5 August
- Venerated in: Roman Catholic Church
- Beatified: 13 October 2013; Complex Educatiu, Tarragona, Spain by Cardinal Angelo Amato
- Attributes: Episcopal attire Pastoral staff
- Patronage: Diocese of Lleida

Salvi Huix Miralpéix (in Spanish: Salvio Huix Miralpéix; 22 December 1877 – 5 August 1936) was a Catalan Roman Catholic cleric who served as Bishop of Lleida from 1935 to 1936. As one of the thirteen bishops killed in the Republican zone during the Spanish Civil War, he has been recognized as a martyr of the Catholic Church and was beatified on 13 October 2013 as part of the 522 Spanish Martyrs.

== Life ==
Salvi Huix Miralpéix was born to a pious and wealthy family in Santa Margarida de Vallors in the municipio of Sant Hilari Sacalm.

He studied at the seminary in Vic, where he was noted for the zeal with which he pursued his studies. He was ordained a priest on 19 September 1903 by Bishop Josep Torras i Bages. After his ordination, he served as an assistant priest in rural parishes in Cóll and Sant Vicenç de Castellet.

In 1907 he enteredCongregation of the Oratory of Saint Philip Neri in Vic. As an Oratorian, he founded a confraternity under the patronage of Saint Joseph, an organization intended to revitalize the spiritual and parish life of working married men. He also taught theology at the seminary of Vic.

On 16 February 1928 he was appointed apostolic administrator of Ibiza and was consecrated as the titular bishop of Selymbria on 15 April the same year by Archbishop Federico Tedeschini. On 28 January 1935 he became bishop of Lleida and on 5 May he took possession of the diocese, succeeding Bishop Manuel Irurita.

During the Civil War, the Republicans attacked the bishop's palace in Lleida in July 1936. Bishop Huix Miralpéix fled and found refuge in the home of some relatives of his domestics. To avoid exposing them to the possibility of reprisal, he handed himself over at a Republican roadblock. He was imprisoned in the prison of Lleida with other Catholics, both ecclesiastics and lay people, where he distinguished himself by continuing to minister to his fellow prisoners.

On 5 August 1936 he was taken from prison with twenty lay people and brought to the municipal cemetery of Lleida. There, he was forced to dig his own grave. The militants offered him freedom, but only if he would renounce his faith, which he refused. Instead, he requested that he be the last of the group to be executed so he could bless the other victims as they died. One of the men objected and shot the bishop in the right arm to stop him from administering his blessings. Undeterred, he continued with his left. Finally, he was killed by a shot to the head.

== Veneration ==
His process of canonization is underway. Theologians approved Miralpéix's spiritual writings on 27 June 1952. Later in 1952 he was granted the title of Servant of God, and on 26 June 2011 he was recognized as a martyr, having been killed in odium fidei.

He was beatified on 13 October 2013 in Tarragona along with another 521 martyrs.

His liturgical feast is kept on 5 August.
