= Georgy Roshko =

French Catholic priest (1915–2003)

George Leonidovich Roshko (Rochcau; 31 December 1915, Cannes, France – 10 August 2003, Paris, France) was a priest of the Catholic Church, Plenipotentiary Visitator for Congregation for the Oriental Churches in leading Russian Catholic ministry in the world, a member of the Pontifical Council Cor Unum, member of the International Catholic Migration Commission, a member of the Pontifical Commission for the codification of Eastern Canon Law, rector of the parish of the Holy Trinity in Paris and a member of Russian apostolate.

== Biography ==
Born into a noble family descended from the leading one of the boyars Dimitrie Cantemir, Roshko was baptized in the Eastern Orthodox Church. His father, Leonid Roshko, served as naval officer and his mother was Maria Alexandrova. His brother Vsevolod Leonidovich Roshko also became a Catholic priest. His uncle, father's brother Vladimir Roshko served as an officer of the Crimean Tatar army and participated in the White movement in 1919, being tortured by the Bolsheviks in Nikolaev. After 1917 the Roshko family went to exile in Japan, from 1918 in the US, and in 1920 moved to Europe, establishing from 1923 in Paris.

== Conversion to Catholicism and ecclesiastical career ==
In 1933 George Roshko joined the Catholic Church. Roshko studied at the University of Sorbonne, in 1934 he studied philosophy at the Catholic University of Lille, in 1935 entered the Russicum. In 1942 Roshko was ordained deacon by the Bishop Pius Eugene Neveu. In 1943 Roshko was ordained Catholic priest. In occupied Paris Roshko assisted Soviet citizens who had escaped from German camps, and the Jews who was in the French Resistance, demobilized from the army with the rank of Major in 1946. After the war, went to Italy to be spiritual father in the camps for Displaced persons. In 1947 he became a teacher at Saint George's boarding school in Meudon. In 1949 at the request of Cardinal Eugene Tisserand he was sent to Brazil to assist in obtaining visas for Russian displaced persons. Then he went to a mission in Paraguay. From 1951 he served in New York City, but because of health problems was forced to return to France. In 1954 he worked in Vietnam through the organization "The Catholic aid." In 1955 Roshko was to Moscow, where he met with the Patriarch of the Russian Orthodox Church, Alexy I of Moscow and Chairman of the Department for External Church Relations Metropolitan Nicholas (Yarushevich) and visited the Trinity Lavra of St. Sergius and Yasnaya Polyana. From 1956 he studied the situation of Russian Catholic movement abroad. In 1957 he helped the Dean (religion) of Saint Trinity Parish in Paris Pavel Grechishkin and his successor Alexander Kulik (1911-1966). In 1966 was appointed rector of the parish, and was assisted by priests, Henri Petitjean, SJ and Bernard Dupire (1926-2005), and some time in the parish served John Soles. In 1962 Roshko participated in the mission of Russian Doukhobors in Nelson, Canada. From 1963 to 1965 participated in all plenary sessions of Second Vatican Council. In 1978 Roshko was appointed Plenipotentiary Visitator for Congregation for the Oriental Churches in leading Russian Catholic ministry in the world. In this capacity, in particular, presented the award to the right to wear the miter Father Romano Scalfi.

== Final Years ==
In 1997 Roshko came to rest lived in Paris, where he died in 2003.

== Works ==
Roshko George. In the service of the world's refugees. M .: Stella Aeterna, 2001. S. 208.

Roshko, On the history of the Russian parish in Goiânia / / Friends and acquaintances . São Paulo . 1973, No. 11. with. 1–2.

Roshko G. Innocent IV and the threat of Mongol invasion : the message of the Pope Daniel of Galicia and Alexander Nevsky / / symbol . Paris. 1988, No. 20. with. 112–113.

== Sources ==
Vladimir Kolupaev. George and Vsevolod Roshko: their life and ministry // Analecta catholica / http://www.catolicmold.md/. VOL. V-VI, 2009–2010. Chişinău . 2012. P. 345 - 368.
