= Daniel Kozelinski Netto =

Ukrainian bishop

- Eparchy of Santa María del Patrocinio en Buenos Aires (administrator)
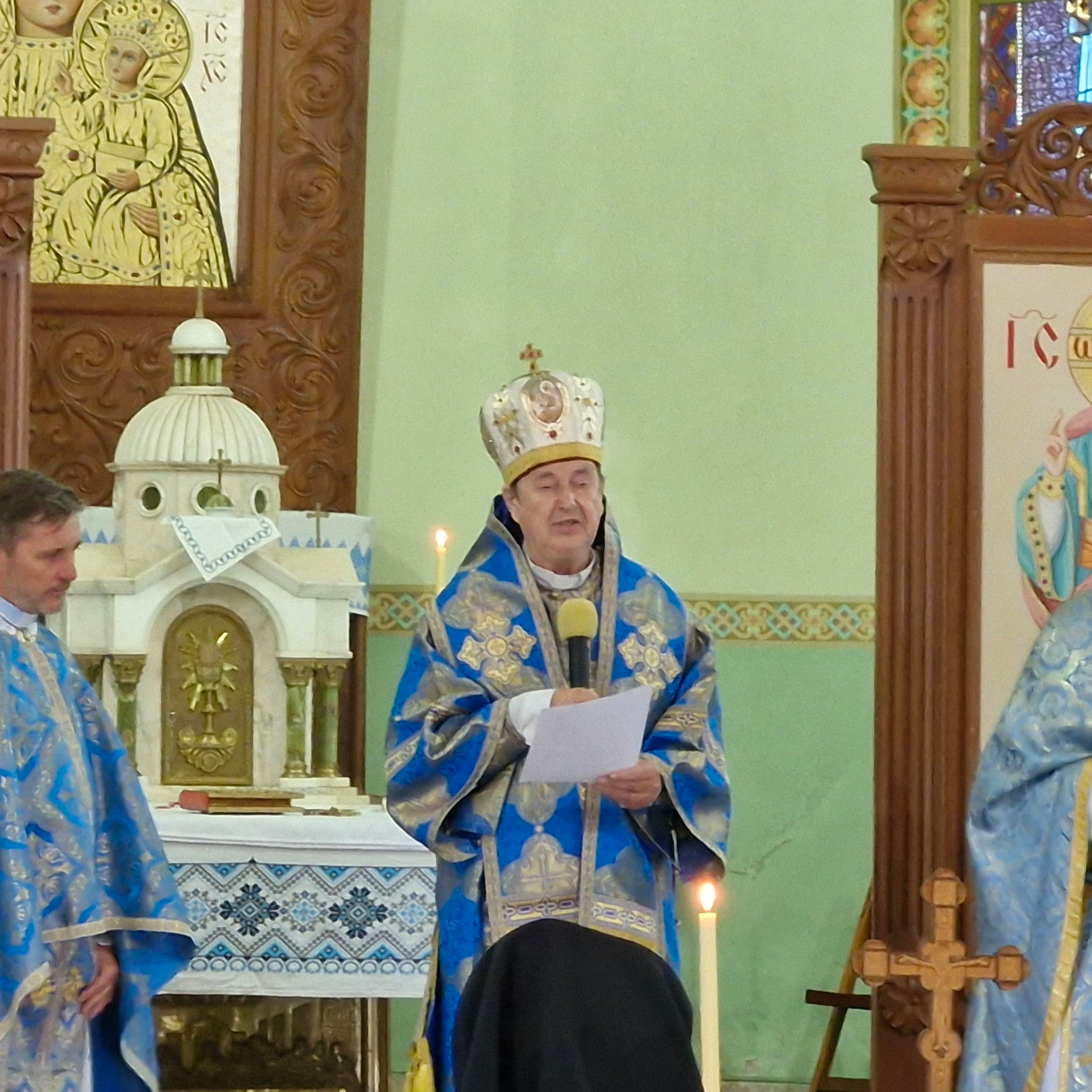
- Church: Ukrainian Greek Catholic Church
- Appointed: 22 June 2011
- Predecessor: Sviatoslav Shevchuk
- Successor: incumbent
- Other post: Eparchy of São João Batista em Curitiba (auxiliary) (2007-2011)

Orders
- Ordination: 10 Feb 1980 (Priest) by Efraím Krevey
- Consecration: 17 Sep 2007 (Bishop) by Lawrence Daniel Huculak

Personal details
- Born: Daniel Kozelinski Netto; 18 February 1952 (age 74) Colônia do Paraíso, Bom Sucesso, Paraná, Brazil

Daniel Kozelinski Netto (born 18 February 1952) is the Apostolic Administrator sede vacante of the Ukrainian Greek Catholic Eparchy of Santa Maria del Patrocinio in Buenos Aires since his appointment by Pope Benedict XVI on 22 June 2011. He had previously served as Auxiliary Bishop of São João Batista in Ukraine in Curitiba.

Kozelinski Netto was born in Colônia do Paraíso, a district of the city of Bom Sucesso, in Paraná state, Brazil in 1952. He attended philosophy studies at the Studium OSBM Curitiba and theology at the Studium Theologicum Claretianum the same city. He holds a bachelor's degree in Youth Ministry and Catechetics at the Pontifical Salesian University in Rome. He was ordained priest 10 February 1980.

He carried out his pastoral ministry in various activities and tasks: coadjutor in the parish of the eparchial cathedral, and pastor of the parish, "St. Joseph" in the seminary and Trainer Dorizon eparchial less, and pastor of the parish "Sacred Heart of Jesus" and Rector of the Minor Seminary; Rector of the Seminary "St. Josaphat," and pastor of the cathedral eparchial, and pastor of the parish, "St. Joseph" in Cantagalo, a student in Rome at the Pontifical Salesian University, in pastoral service in the city of Mallet, PR.

On 20 June 2007 he was appointed Titular Bishop of Eminenziana by Pope Benedict XVI and Auxiliary of the Eparchy of São João Batista of the Ukrainians in Curitiba (Brazil). He received his episcopal consecration on 16 September of same year. At present, plays the role of the Eparchy Syncellus and deals with the region's pastoral União da Vitoria, a city where she lives.

He was appointed Apostolic Administrator sede vacante of the Ukrainian Greek Catholic Eparchy of Santa Maria del Patrocinio in Buenos Aires on 22 June 2011 replacing Sviatoslav Shevchuk who was elected Major Archbishop following the retirement of Cardinal Husar.

On January 12, 2013 he also was appointed by the Holy See as Apostolic Visitor in Uruguay, Paraguay, Chile and Venezuela for Ukrainian Catholics.
