= Gaetano Piccinini =

Father Gaetano Piccinini (1904–1972) was a priest of the Don Orione Congregation, whose life encompassed religious activity in Rome and Latium. The best known and, since June 2011, officially recognized aspect of his activity has been exalted by the inscription of his name, posthumously, in the list of the "Righteous among the Nations" at the Yad Vashem in Jerusalem.

The recognition ceremony took place in Rome; Jew Bruno Camerini described how this priest was able to save him, his sisters and mother when he was a boy by hosting and hiding them in several religious locations during the Nazi roundup in the ghetto of Rome. "Father Gaetano acted in this way because he was fulfilling the precept of loving one's neighbour, already written in the Bible." As a boy in hiding, he mentally witnessed the departure of the train to Auschwitz concentration camp on October 18, 1943. He also added that Father Piccinini always respected his Jewish faith.

Also attending was Mordechay Lewy, Ambassador of Israel to the Holy See, who said, "It would be a mistake to think that the help to the Jews during the war in Rome came from convents and religious institutions as if it were their own initiative without support from the Vatican."
