= Ryszkowa Wola =

- Village
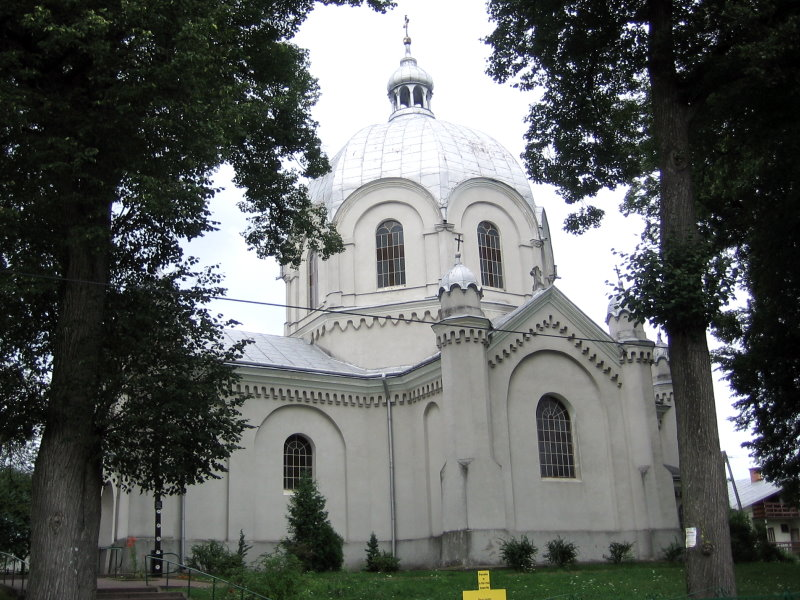
- Church in Ryszkowa Wola (formerly cerkiew)

- Location within Poland
- Coordinates: 50°4′N 22°52′E
- Country: Poland
- Voivodeship: Subcarpathian
- County: Jarosław
- Gmina: Wiązownica
- Population: 789

Ryszkowa Wola [rɨʂˈkɔva ˈvɔla] is a village in the administrative district of Gmina Wiązownica, within Jarosław County, Subcarpathian Voivodeship, in south-eastern Poland.
