= Mikhail Gavrilov =

Religious Writer and Professor

Mikhail Gavrilov (9 April 1893 in Saint Petersburg, Russian Empire - 4 April 1954), professor, religious writer, historian, teacher, Russian Catholic apostolate in exile, member of the a parishioner of the Greek Catholic Church of the Annunciation in Brussels after of Parish of Holy Trinity in Paris, author and fellow publishers of the newspapers "Life with God" and "East Christian Center" and member of Russian apostolate in the Diaspora. Gavrilov's works broadcast transmissions to the world and the light of life looked out on the waves of the Monte Carlo.

== Biography ==
Gavrilov entered the Odessa University in Odessa, where he studied at the Faculty of History and Philology, and later transferred to the School of Law in St. Petersburg. After that he emigrated to Romania, and then moved to France, graduated from the Sorbonne in [Paris. Gavrilov taught at the Russian school in Paris and Saint George boarding in Meudon, led the research and education activities at the Institut Catholique de Paris.

== Gavrilov's beliefs ==
Gavrilov converted to Catholicism from Orthodoxy and quite deliberately came to the belief that the truth and fullness of perfect Orthodoxy is in Catholicism. Being a Catholic, he remained staunch defender of the values of the Eastern church tradition, defining Russian Catholicism as follows: "The meaning of Russian Catholicism and Russian Catholics only to actually show the possibility of Orthodoxy to Catholicism."

In 1950, Gavrilov was one of the initiators of the pilgrimage of Russian Catholics in Rome, which resulted in the apostolic letter of Pope Pius XII to the peoples of Russia Sacro Vergente Anno to consecration of Russia and the Heart of Our Lady in 1952.

Cardinal Eugene Tisserand repeatedly said Gavrilov's works were a great benefit to Christian unity. Gavrilov was a member of the Congress of Russian Catholics in the Russian Diaspora.

== Works ==
Published numerous articles in the journal "Russia and the Universal Church," the Paris Catholic bulletene "Our Parish", and published in various German, English and French periodicals. Major works:

http://krotov.info/history/05/lebedev/gavrilov.html

Gavrilov MN Vatican. War and Peace. 1953. 27.

Gavrilov MN Spiritual Foundations of Russian Culture: The main ideas of creativity Dostoevsky. 1954. 24 s.

Gavrilov MN New phenomena world Blessed Virgin: The Story of Fatima ... 1949. 29.

Gavrilov MN Orthodoxy and Ferrara-Florence Cathedral. 1954. 16.

Gavrilov MN St. Nicholas the Wonderworker of Myra. 1950. 32.

Gavrilov MN St. Nicholas the Wonderworker of Myra. 1987. 32.

Gavrilov MN Mystery of the Nativity and the Assumption of the Blessed Virgin. 1950. 17.

Gavrilov MN The Shroud of Turin: Description and scientific explanation. 1964. 24 s.

Gavrilov MN Ferrara-Florence Cathedral and Russia. 1955. 28.

Gavrilov, MN, Tyszkiewicz Stanislav cvyasch. Saint Pius X

Gavrilov MN A letter to the person who wants to "go" to Catholicism
