= Alexander Kulik =

Alexander Kulik (September 11, 1911 – October 17, 1966) was a Mitred Archpriest, advisor of the Congregation for the Oriental Churches, journalist, member of Russian apostolate and a leader of the Russian Diaspora.

== Biography ==
Kulik was born in Białystok in an Orthodox family. He studied at St. George's boarding school in Meudon, Belgium. Kulik converted to Catholicism in 1930. From 1931 he studied at the Pontifical Oriental Institute in Russicum. Kulik was ordained Catholic priest on June 12, 1936, led the pastoral work among Russian immigrants in Lille and serving in French parishes. In 1948 Kulik was sent to Buenos Aires, Argentina, where he edited the newspaper " For the truth! ", worked in Iternat Saint Andrew. In 1953 Kulik, along with Philippe de Régis was the founder of the Institute of Russian Culture. Summoned to Rome and appointed advisor to the Congregation for the Oriental Churches. Kulik was also a member of the Second Vatican Council, which was accredited translator for Russian Orthodox Church official delegations. In 1963 was awarded the right to wear a miter and in 1965 was appointed rector of the parish of the Holy Trinity in Paris, where before for many years was a priest. Father Alexander Kulik died in 1966 in Rome.

== Notes ==
- Chronicle / / Our parish . Paris. 1948, № 4. with. 29.
- Régis Philippe de. Russia and the Universal Church. 1953, № 2. with. 15
- Russia and the Universal Church. 1953, № 6.
- Mikhail Gavrilov. A letter to the person who wants to "go" to Catholicism, Boulogne, 19/03/1950.
