= Sons of Divine Providence =

- Figli della Divina Provvidenza (Italian)
- Abbreviation: F.D.P. (post-nominal letters)
- Nickname: Orionine Fathers
- Formation: 1903; 123 years ago
- Founder: Saint Fr. Luigi Orione, FDP
- Founded at: Turin, Italy
- Type: Clerical Religious Congregation of Pontifical Right (for Men)
- Headquarters: Via Etruria 6, Rome, Italy
- Members: 945 members (628 priests) as of 2018
- Superior General: Rev. Fr. Tarcísio Gregório Vieira, FDP
- Parent organization: Roman Catholic Church
- Website: http://www.donorione.org/

The Sons of Divine Providence (Italian: Figli della Divina Provvidenza), commonly called the Orionine Fathers, is a Roman Catholic clerical religious congregation of Pontifical Right for men founded in 1903 by Luigi Orione (1872–1940) in Turin, Italy. Its members add the nominal letters F.D.P. after their names to indicate membership in the congregation. It is dedicated to helping the poor and is currently active in 23 nations.

== History ==
The Sons of Divine Providence is a Catholic religious institute founded in Italy in 1893 by Luigi Orione. Orione began his work with orphans and street children in the city of Tortona in north-west Italy while he was still a student. On October 15, 1895, Orione opened his first boarding school, titled the Little House of Divine Providence. A man of enormous energy, by the time of his death in 1940 Don Orione and his followers had established services for the care of elderly, disabled and disadvantaged people all over Italy, as well as in Poland, Brazil, Argentina and Palestine.

In 1913 began the activities of the missions outside Italy with the departure of a priest and two brothers to Brazil, immediately followed by other expeditions to Argentina and the Holy Land. Orione himself served as a missionary in Latin America (Brazil, Argentina, Uruguay and Chile) in the years 1921-22 and 1934–37. In the 1920s and 1930s, while continuing assistance to youth with orphanages, agricultural schools and education institutions, the institute deepened the commitment to pastoral care to other categories of the needy; developed health care activity for people with severe mental and physical disabilities, and nursing homes for the elderly and lonely people.

== Description ==
The English Delegation "Mother of the Church", run presently by Father Malcolm George Dyer, is present in the Philippines, India, Jordan, Kenya, United Kingdom, Ireland, and in USA.

- The first foundation of the Little Work of Divine Providence in the United States was a home for elderly Italian immigrants in Boston.
- The Sons of Divine Providence came to England in 1949 when Fr. Paul Bidone arrived from Italy. He spoke no English and carried only a ten shilling note (now 50p) and the name of one British contact. However, three years later he had opened the first home, Fatima House in south London, for homeless elderly men.
- Don Orione missionaries have been present in Kenya since the arrival in 1996 of the first Italian priest Fr Giuseppe Vallauri, who had been resident in England for many years. Fr Vallauri settled in Langata South Road in the outskirts of Nairobi, purchasing a house which later became the first seminary.

Saint Luigi Orione's motto, and that of the FDP, is: "Fare del bene a tutti, fare del bene sempre, del male mai a nessuno." ("Do good to all, do good always, never do harm to anyone.")

As of 2016, the Sons of Divine Providence number 1023: three bishops, 728 priests, 82 brothers, and eight hermits. In formation there are 201 clerics and 19 brothers of temporary vows, and 45 novices. The FDP have centers in 296 localities in 32 nations.

In the United States, the headquarters of the congregation is at the National Shrine of the Madonna, located on a historic hill in East Boston, Massachusetts, known as Orient Heights.

== Saints, Blesseds, and other holy people ==
Saints

- Luigi Giovanni Orione (23 June 1872 - 12 March 1940), founder of the order, canonized on 16 May 2004

Blesseds

- Ricardo Gil Barcelón (27 October 1873 – 3 August 1936), priest and Martyr of the Spanish Civil War, beatified on 13 October 2013
- Antonio Isidoro Arrué Peiró (4 April 1908 – 3 August 1936), postulant and Martyr of the Spanish Civil War, beatified on 13 October 2013
- Franciszek Drzewiecki (26 February 1908 - 10 August 1942), priest and Martyr of the Second World War, beatified on 13 June 1999

Venerables

- Carlo Sterpi (11 October 1874 - 22 November 1951), priest, declared Venerable on 7 September 1989
- Cesare (Ave Maria) Pisano (24 February 1900 - 21 January 1964), professed religious, declared Venerable on 18 December 1997

Servants of God

- Gaspare Goggi (6 January 1877 - 4 August 1908), priest
