= Vsevolod Roshko =

Russian historian, priest and missionary (1917–1984)

Vsevolod Leonidovich Roshko (in French Vsevolod Rochcau, 23 May 1917, Moscow, Russian Empire - 13 December 1984, Jerusalem, Israel) was a priest of the Russian Catholic Church of the Byzantine rite, the church historian, missionary, a member of Russian apostolate and leader of Russian diaspora.

== Biography ==
Born into a noble family, the leading origin from one of the boyars Dimitrie Cantemir, Roshko was baptized in the Russian Orthodox Church. His brother Georgy Roshko also became a Catholic priest and his uncle, father's brother Vladimir Roshko served as an officer of the Crimean Tatar army, participated in the White movement in 1919 and was tortured by the Bolsheviks in Mykolaiv. After 1917 the family was in exile in Japan, in 1918 to United States, in 1920 moved to Europe, from 1923 lived in Paris, where Vsevolod in 1936 graduated from high school and enrolled at the university. As well as the older brother, Vsevolod converted to Catholicism, entered the Dominican Order, but his monastic vows there has not accepted, and later he became a member of the Charles de Foucauld´s community Little Brothers of Jesus. In 1946 Vsevolod Roshko was ordained priest in Rome, serving the Russian refugees in Italy, then was transferred to Buenos Aires, Argentina, where he worked in the parish of Peter and Paul Parish, Guemes, Transfiguration Church, Los Kardales and Iternat Saint Andrew, Argentina. In 1949 he was sent to the Russian Catholic community in Santiago de Chile, Chile. The next posting was Russian Catholic Mission in Dillingham, Alaska, United States, where Roshko take a serious study of life and work of Russian missionary Herman of Alaska. In 1964 Roshko moved to Israel, where he became vice-director of the houses for the poor pilgrims "House of Abraham" in the jurisdiction of the Melkite Greek Catholic Church. Vsevolod Roshko visited the Soviet Union as a tourist in the late 1970s and early 1980s. Father Vsevolod was in correspondence with Archpriest Alexander Men. Range of scientific and theological interests Roshko was very diverse, in addition to the epistolary heritage he has other work - this books and articles, including those on the history of the Russian presence and Orthodoxy in Alaska, the history of the Russian Old Believers in the face Avvakum, a number of Eastern saints, including Palestinian holy fool Simeon Sallosu. Serious work of Vsevolod Roshko - a book " Seraphim: Sarov and Diveevo", which was written in exile in French at affordable sources in the western world, the author wrote it in Paris and Jerusalem. Living on Holy Land Roshko was close to Orthodox priests Ilya Shmain and Michael Aksenov-Meerson. In 1982 Roshko retired, living in the home of Italian nuns in which he died on December 13, 1984, in Jerusalem, buried in Mater Misericordia.

== Sources ==
- Bychkov SA Entry / / Roshko B. Seraphim: Sarov and Diveevo. M. 1994. with. 3 - 4.
- Shmain Roshko Vsevolod I. Obituary / / Bulletin RCD. 1984, № 143. with. 234.
- Vsevolod Roshko: Obituary / / Russian thought. 1984, N 3549. with. 15.
- Roshko George, chaplain. In the service of the world's refugees: Indicates Russian Catholic priest / A. Rat, comments. and trans. M.: Stella Aeterna, 2001. with. 43.
- Vladimir Kolupaev. George and Vsevolod Roshko: their life and ministry / / Analecta catholica / Episcopia Romano-Catolică de Chişinău . VOL. V-VI, 2009-2010. Chişinău . 2012. P. 345-368.
- Michael Aksenov-Meerson, Fr. Visiting on. Ilya Shmaina in Jerusalem / / New Journal. M. 2009, № 254. with. 17.
