= Verona (disambiguation) =

Verona is a city in Italy.

Verona may also refer to:

== Places ==
=== Europe ===
- March of Verona, a march of the Holy Roman Empire
- Province of Verona, Italy
- Varniai, a city in Lithuania

=== United States ===
- Verona, California, an unincorporated community
- Verona, Kentucky, an unincorporated community and census-designated place
- Verona, Illinois, a village
- Verona, Calhoun County, Michigan, a former unincorporated community
- Verona, Huron County, Michigan, an unincorporated community
- Verona Township, Michigan
- Verona Township, Faribault County, Minnesota
- Verona, Mississippi, a city
- Verona, Missouri, a city
- Verona, Nebraska, an unincorporated community
- Verona, New Jersey, a township
  - Verona station (Erie Railroad)
- Verona, New York, a town
  - Verona (CDP), New York, a census-designated place
- Verona, North Carolina, a town
- Verona (Jackson, North Carolina), listed on the NRHP in North Carolina
- Verona, North Dakota, a city
- Verona, Ohio, a village
- Verona, Pennsylvania, a borough
- Verona, Tennessee, an unincorporated community
- Verona, Texas, an unincorporated community
- Verona, Virginia, a census-designated place
- Verona, Wisconsin, a city
  - Verona (town), Wisconsin
- Verona Island, Maine, a town and the island on which it sits
- Lake Verona, Florida

=== Canada ===
- Verona, Ontario

== Music ==
- Verona (band), Venezuelan rock band
- Verona (Czech group), dance music group
- "Verona" (song), the Estonian song for the Eurovision Song Contest 2017, by Koit Toome & Laura Põldvere
- "Verona", a song by the New Zealand band Elemeno P
- "Verona", a song by Heather Nova from Oyster
- "Verona", a song by Muse from the 2022 album Will of the People
- Verona, a 1990 concert film by the Scottish rock band Simple Minds

== People ==
- Verona (name), a list of people with the given name or surname
- Family of Verona, an Italian noble family originally from Verona

== Schools ==
- University of Verona, Verona, Italy
- Verona High School (disambiguation), various schools or school buildings in the United States
- Verona School, a public school building in Verona, Virginia, on the National Register of Historic Places

== Transportation ==
- Verona (1865), 19th-century British ship
- Verona (steamship), a small steamship of the Puget Sound Mosquito Fleet
- Ford Verona, a small family car based on the Escort
- Suzuki Verona, a mid-sized car, a rebadging of the Daewoo Magnus in the United States

== Other uses ==
- Verona Pictures, an Indonesian film production
- Hellas Verona F.C., an association football club from Verona, Italy
- Battle of Verona (disambiguation)
- 85th Volunteer Training Regiment "Verona", a unit of the Italian Army
- Project Verona, an experimental research programming language developed by Microsoft

== See also ==
- Venona project, a code-breaking project sometimes misspelled as Verona
- Veronese
- Veronica (name)
