= Verona Township =

Verona Township may refer to the following places in the United States:

- Verona Township, Huron County, Michigan
- Verona Township, Faribault County, Minnesota
- Verona Township, Adams County, Nebraska
- Verona Township, Essex County, New Jersey

See also

- Verona (disambiguation)
