= Leonte Moldovan =

Romanian politician (1865–1943)

Leonte Moldovan (February 18, 1865 – September 18, 1943) was an Austrian Empire-born Romanian lawyer, journalist and politician.

Moldovan was born in Șinca Veche, a village near Făgăraș in Transylvania. He moved with his family to the Romanian Old Kingdom in 1866, receiving citizenship in 1895. He returned to his native region for gymnasium, attending school at Brașov from 1876 to 1885. Moldovan then went to the University of Bucharest, where he studied literature and law. He taught history in Brăila from 1887 to 1903 and, from 1903, practiced as a lawyer.

A member of the National Liberal Party (PNL), Moldovan was elected senator in 1912 and became a deputy in 1914. After World War I, he headed the Brăila PNL chapter, and was the city's elected mayor from 1922 to 1926. In 1933, he became a senator by right, and served as Senate President from February 1934 to November 1935. He encouraged journalism, and in Brăila was director, owner and editor of Lupta națională, Orientarea and Voința magazines. He died in Făgăraș.
