= Leonte =

Leonte is both a given name and a surname. Notable people with the name include:

- Leonte Filipescu, Romanian communist
- Leonte Moldovan
- Leonte Răutu
- Leonte Tismăneanu, Romanian communist activist and propagandist
- Gheorghe Leonte, Romanian rugby union footballer

It is also the name of a military operation (Leonte Operation) that began in 2006 under UNIFIL.
