= St. Nicholas Church, Brăila =

Romanian Orthodox church in Brăila, Romania

St. Nicholas Church
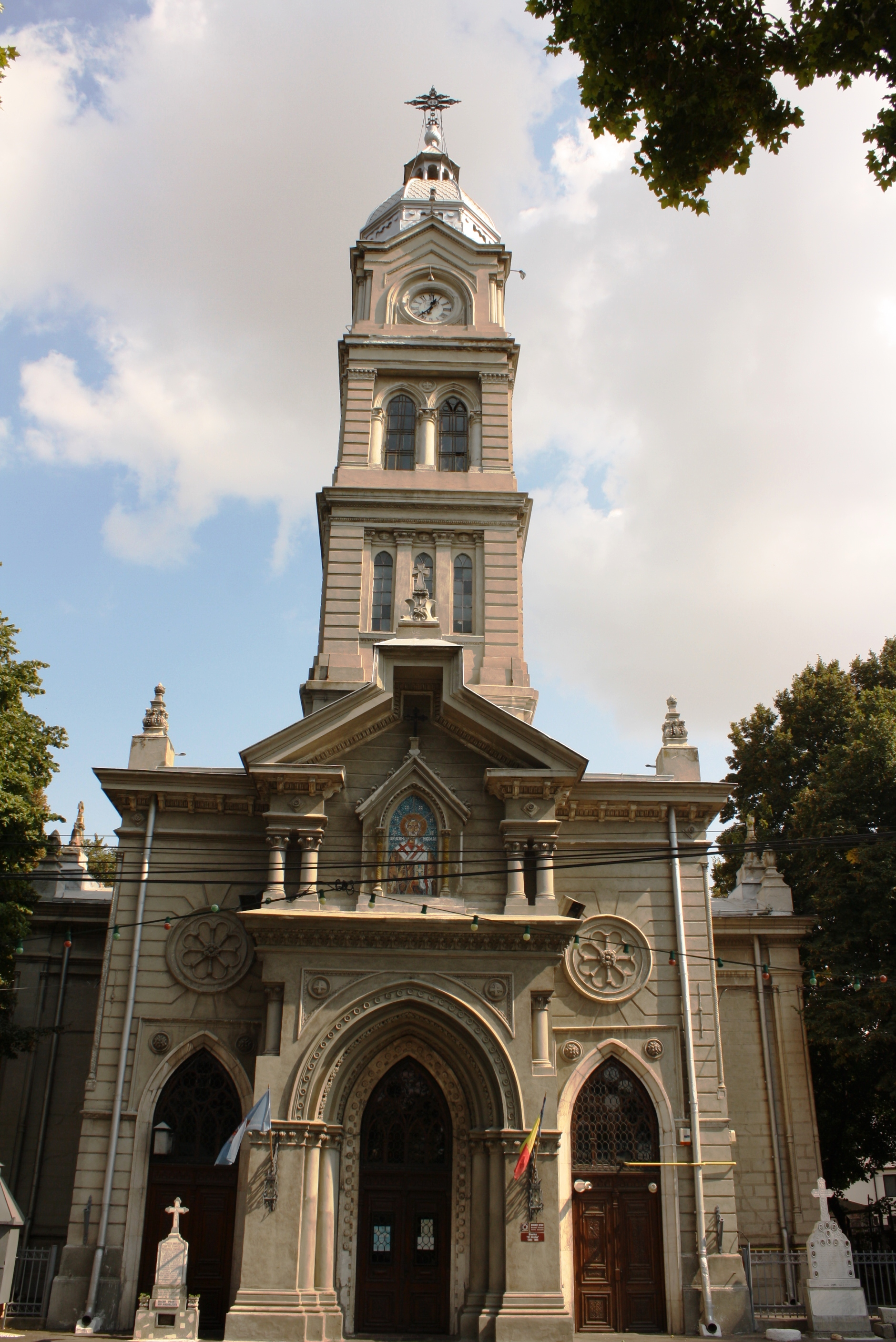
- St. Nicholas Church
- St. Nicholas Church
- 45°16′6″N 27°58′19″E
- Location: Brăila, Romania
- Denomination: Romanian Orthodox

The St. Nicholas Church (Romanian: Biserica Sfântul Nicolae) is a Romanian Orthodox church at 12 Ana Aslan Street in Brăila, Romania. It is the second oldest such building in the city, the first being the Church of the Holy Archangels Michael and Gabriel, and was built on the site of an older church that was burnt down by a fire. For a time it was the tallest building in the city, and thus, its bell tower served as an observation point for firefighters of Brăila to prevent fires.

The old St. Nicholas Church was built between 1835 and 1837, but a firefighter smoked in the bell tower of the church and provoked a fire. As a result, it was rebuilt between 1860 and 1865 with larger and more durable materials with the funding of several wealthy inhabitants of the city in the Gothic Revival style and according to the plans of architect Dimitrie Poenaru. The paintings of the new church were made by Petre Alexandrescu in 1865.
