= George Baronzi =

Romanian poet and translator (1828–1896)

George Baronzi (Romanian pronunciation: [ˈdʒe̯ordʒe baronzi]; 1828 in Brăila – May 28, 1896) was a Romanian poet and translator. He was of Greek origin.

== Works ==
=== Poetry ===
- Nopturne (1853)
- Orele dalbe (1864)
- Satire (1867)
- Legende şi balade
- Poezii alese, postum (1909)

=== Other ===
- Misterele Bucureştului, 3 volume, (1862–1864)
- Matei Basarab sau Dorobanţi şi semeni
