= Greek Church, Brăila =

Heritage site in Brăila County, Romania

Coordinates: 45°16′13″N 27°58′33″E

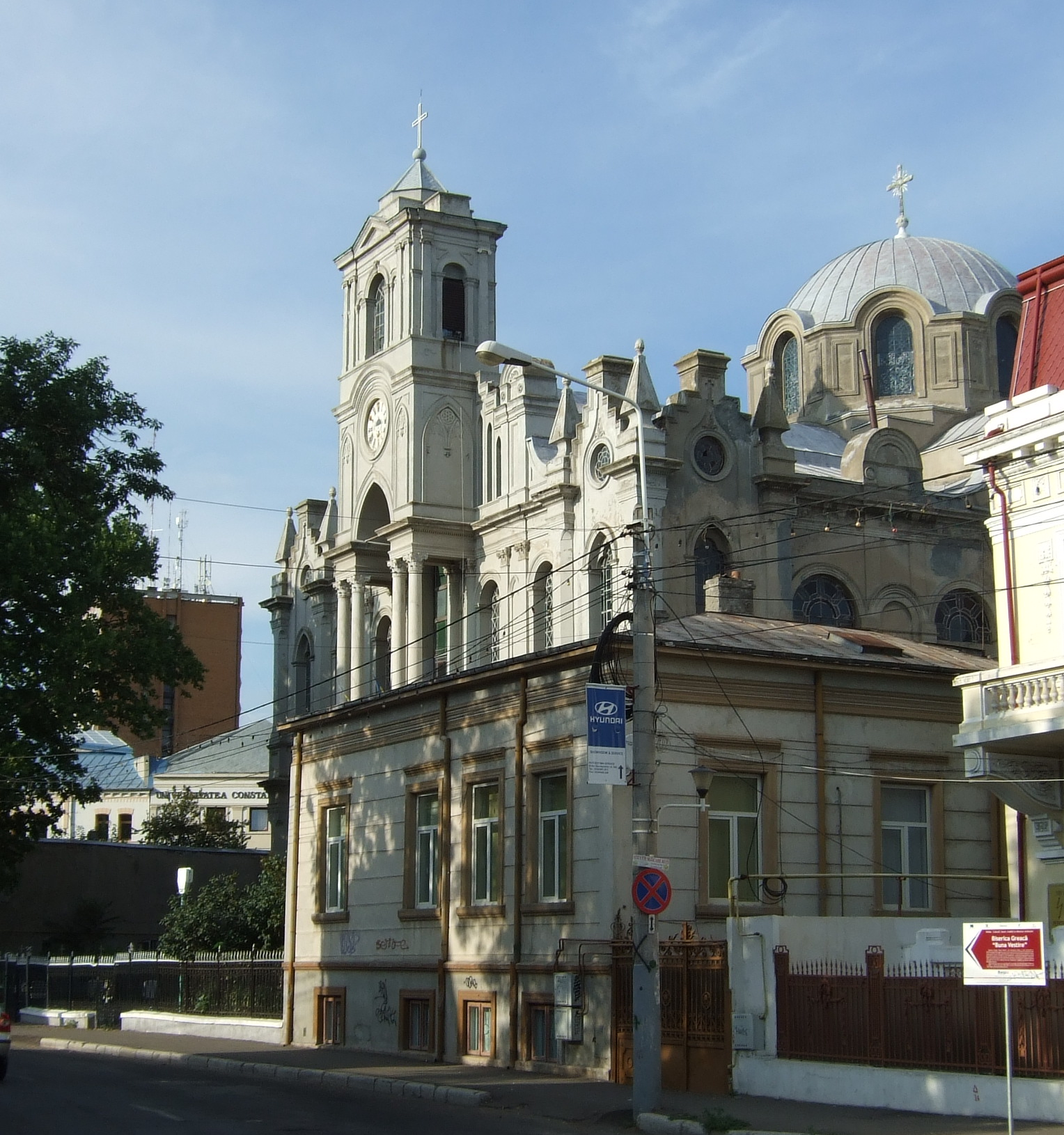
Greek Church

The Greek Church (Romanian: Biserica Greacă) is a Romanian Orthodox church located at 3 Calea Călărașilor, Brăila, Romania. It is dedicated to the Feast of the Annunciation.

In 1863, the local Greek community decided to build a church, with services in Greek. It would serve both the Greek inhabitants of the city and the Greeks who arrived from abroad in the Port of Brăila. The architect was Avraam Ioanidis of Bursa. He also supervised construction, largely executed by Italian workers. The church is cruciform, with two spires. The dominant architectural style is Byzantine Revival, with Greek, Gothic and Renaissance Revival touches. It was completed in 1872. Bishop Melchisedec Ștefănescu consecrated it the same year.

Gheorghe Tattarescu painted part of the church in 1872. Constantinos Livadas Liochis continued the work in 1901. Dimitrie Belizarie finished in 1945-1946. There are three altars. During construction, a stream was discovered underground. This flows into a well, and the water is annually blessed for holy water.

The church is administered by the Lower Danube Archdiocese of the Romanian Orthodox Church. It is listed as a historic monument by Romania's Ministry of Culture and Religious Affairs.
