= Siege of Brăila =

- Part of the Russo-Turkish War
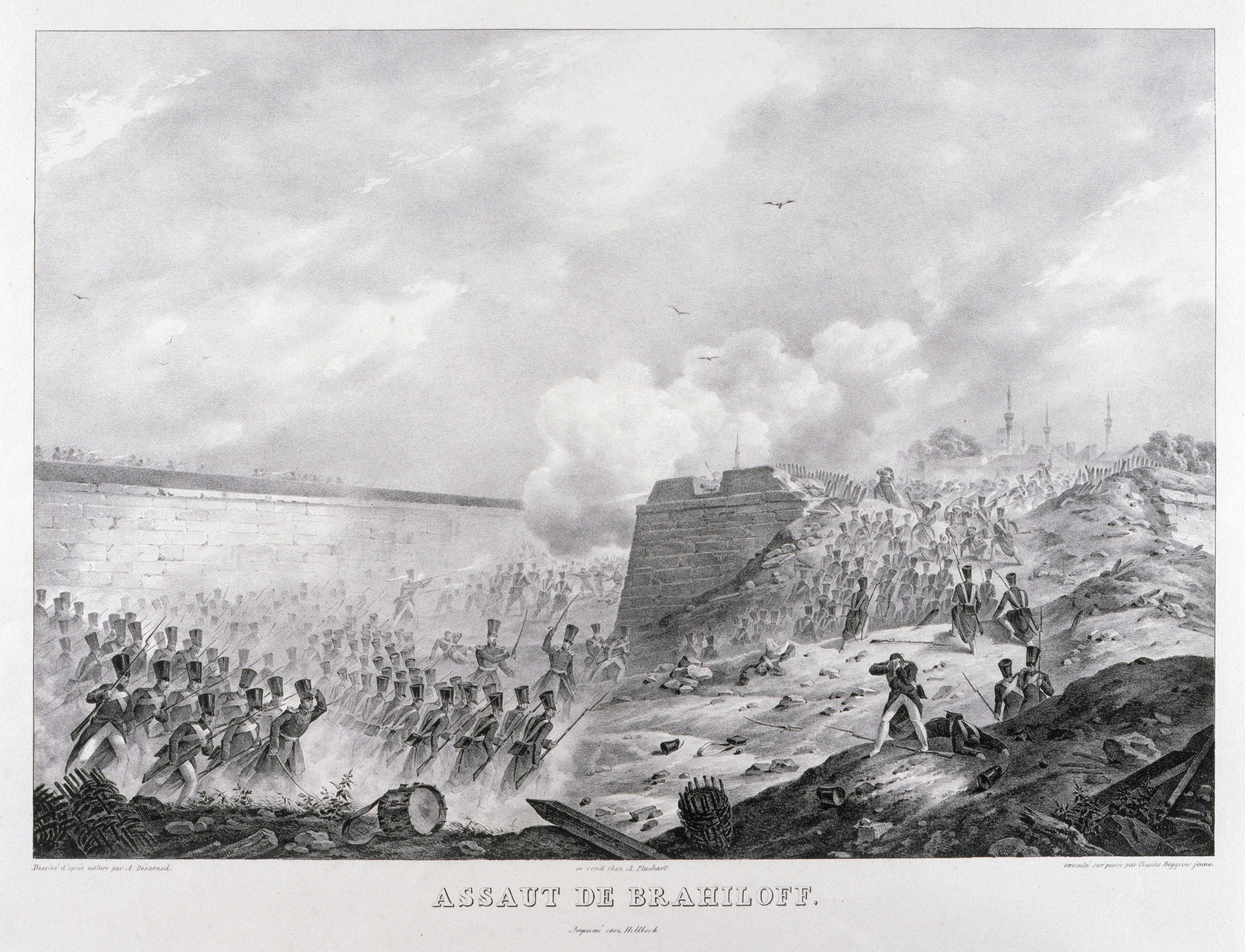
- The unsuccessful attack of the Russian army on 15 June 1828
Date	11 May – 23 June 1828
Location	Brăila, Ottoman Empire (now Romania)
Result	Russian victory

Belligerents
Russian Empire	Ottoman Empire

Commanders and leaders
Michael Pavlovich	Mehmed Selim Pasha

Strength
20,000 soldiers	8,000 soldiers

Casualties and losses
Unknown	Unknown

The siege of Brăila (Russian: Осада Браи́лов) was fought during the Russo-Turkish War on 11 May to 23 June 1829 between Russian Empire and the Ottoman Empire.

== Siege ==
The vanguard units of the Russian army arrived in front of the Ibrail Castle on May 11 and started the blockade from May 12, and on May 21, the siege began with the arrival of the Russian 7th Army under the command of General Grand Duke Mikhail Pavlovich and General Vovanov to the region with cannons. The Russian army allocated a force of approximately 20,000 soldiers for the siege (there were also 47,000 workers for fortification activities). After the reconnaissance activities, the Russian army decided to attack the castle from the west.

The Ottoman garrison began to inflict casualties against the Russians, who completed the digging of the trenches on June 3–6. On June 8, the Russian Danube fleet of 18 ships under the command of Admiral Zautski also arrived before them. Opposite it, the 32-piece Ottoman Danube fleet was deployed. When the Ottoman fleet was defeated in the battle, the Maçin (now Măcin) castle, which was left without reinforcements, fell.

Although the Russian army launched an attack on June 15, the Russian troops, who attacked in a narrow area because the sewer in the south could not create enough damage, suffered significant losses. When Russian Commander Grand Duke Michael ordered the troops to stop the attack and retreat, the loss of the Russian army exceeded 2,000 including at least 650 dead and 1,400 wounded.

However, since the castle, which had been under siege for more than a month, had no strength left to resist, Mehmed Selim Pasha offered to negotiate within the framework of the surrender offer made by the Russian army before on 17 June. The Ottoman garrison evacuated the Ibrail castle on 23 June, after the Russian side accepted the offer that the castle could be surrendered on the condition that 8,000 castle guards unfurl their banners and their weapons and pass freely to Silistra.

== Aftermath ==
Ibrail Castle resisted the Russian army for about a month from 21 May to 18 June, the Ottoman army came to the front and the main targets of the Russian army were Shumen, Ruschuk and Varna. It gave him a critical time to reinforce.

In addition, the Ottoman garrison eliminated approximately 4,000 soldiers from the Russian army (5,000 according to Turkish sources) with almost no losses., the garrison itself joined the main Ottoman army with its weapons.

On the other hand, the Russian army, in addition to the loss of 4,000 soldiers, had to carry out its forward operations in the summer months, wasting time in front of the Ibrail Castle until the end of June, especially in the swampy and damp terrain of Dobruja, suffering from malaria and dysentery. They started to suffer serious losses.

Mehmed Selim Pasha, commander of the garrison in Ibrail Castle; Although he was initially sentenced to death for surrendering the castle, he was pardoned when the benefits of his defense were realized, however, his title of grand vizier was later taken back and he was exiled to Zagora.

== Sources ==
- N. A. Epanchin. Sketch of the 1829 campaign in European Turkey. Part I. St. Petersburg. 1906-07
- A. A. Kersnovsky. War with Turkey 1828-1829 // History of the Russian Army. - M.: Golos, 1992. - T. 2.
- N. A. Lukyanovich. Description of the Turkish War of 1828 and 1829. SPb.: Type. Eduard Pratsa, 1844 - 1847.
