= Marius Zirra =

Romanian-American ballet master (1926-2004)

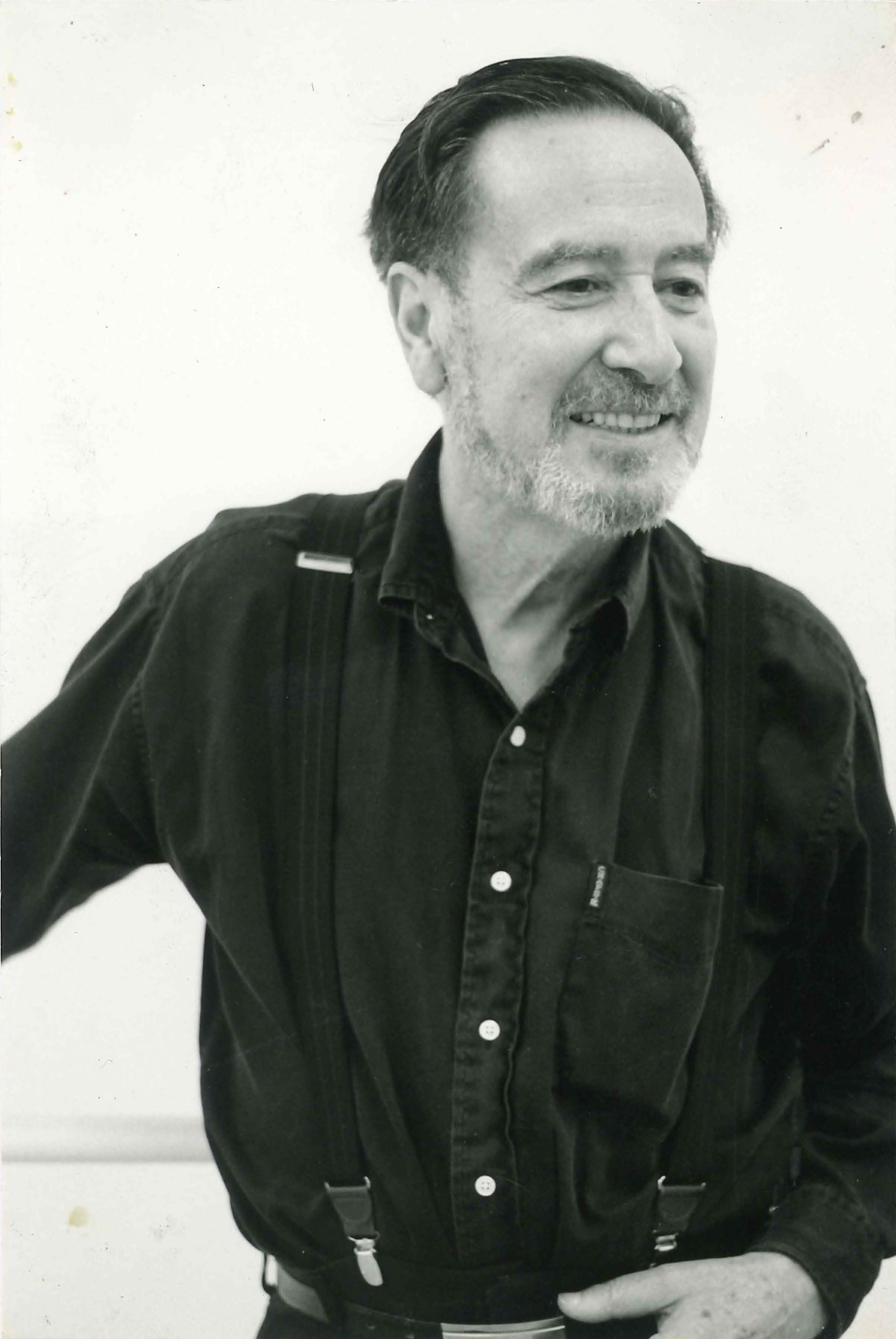
- Born: Marius Ion Zirra; October 30, 1926; Brăila, Romania
- Died: October 5, 2004 (aged 77); Pocatello, Idaho, United States
- Occupations: Dancer, choreographer and artistic director
- Years active: 1953-2004

Marius Ion Zirra (October 30, 1926 – October 5, 2004) was a Romanian-American ballet dancer, choreographer, and artistic director. He was also a young fighter pilot in WWII fighting for Romania when it was one of the Axis Powers allied with Germany.

== Early life and military career (1926–1953) ==
Born in Brăila, Romania, Zirra relocated to Bucharest at the age of 11. During World War II, he served as one of the youngest pilots in the Romanian air force, flying combat fighters under German occupation in WWII. At the age of twenty-six after serving two years in prison under Russian occupation after the war, he was cast as a ballet dancer at the Bucharest Opera Company, although he auditioned as an extra as an actor.

== Professional career ==
=== Romania and Europe (1953–1976) ===
In 1952, Zirra transitioned to ballet, joining the Bucharest Ballet, where he worked as a dancer, ballet master, and choreographer. He danced with the Bucharest Ballet from 1953-1969. He also collaborated with various opera and ballet companies across Romania, including the Operas of Brașov, Timișoara, and Iași, as well as the Operetta Theater.

In 1970, Zirra traveled to St. Petersburg, Russia, to study at the Kirov Ballet School (now the Mariinksy Ballet), where he earned his Ballet Master Certificate. For the next six years, he was Ballet Master and then Artistic Director for the Bucharest, the Galați, and the Iași Ballet Companies in Romania, and for the Klagenfurt Ballet·Company in Austria.

=== United States (1976–2004) ===
Zirra's American journey began in 1976 when he participated in a cultural exchange program. He defected in 1977 and became Ballet Master for the San Diego Ballet Company from 1977-1978. He later served as Artistic Director of California Ballet Company (San Diego) from 1978-1980, and Stage 7 Dance Theatre in San Diego in 1983.

Mr. Zirra moved to Idaho to become the Artistic Director and Ballet Master of the American Festival Ballet Company in Boise from 1983-1988. Mr. Zirra taught and coached widely in New York, Denver, San Diego, Dallas, and Los Angeles. In 1988, he and his wife relocated to Pocatello, Idaho where he founded the Marius Zirra School of Ballet. He taught from 1991-2002 at summer intensive workshops including Summer DanceFest at Boise State University; the Eugene Ballet workshop in Boise, and the Eugene and the Pacific Coast (Newport) Ballet Schools in Oregon. He died on October 5, 2004, in Pocatello, Idaho, leaving behind a lasting impact on generations of aspiring dancers and a rich legacy in the world of dance.

=== Notable works (1976–1997) ===
Throughout his career, Zirra choreographed countless original individual pieces and full ballets, some still in circulation today. Notable productions include "Othello" (1976), which he transformed into a full-length ballet, a re-staging of Giselle for the California Ballet Company in 1997, "The Miraculous Mandarin," 1979 a dance drama known for its theatricality and emotional depth, and "The Little Match Girl", a ballet based on the story by Hans Christan Anderson.
