= Vidin-Progresul =

Vidin-Progresul is a neighborhood located in the NNE of Brăila, Romania roughly between "Calea Galaţi" (eastern boundary) and Izlaz (southern boundary).

== History ==
Vidin-Progresul is a new area built over the existing neighborhood in the mid-to-late 1970s. Old houses have been demolished and new buildings, block-houses, have been erected instead. The large majority of the new inhabitants used to work on "Progresul" (nowadays called "Promex") industrial plant. Not all the old neighborhood was demolished, part of it still exists today near the main road "Calea Galati".

== Population ==
Many of the people living here are old inhabitants, newcomers are in large majority peasants that were trained in professional schools to cope with industrial working requirements. The newcomers used to commute from their villages to Braila to get to work, but settled here as soon as the new block-houses have been finished.

== Economic life ==
The major factory which resides into this area boundaries was "Progresul" ("The Progress" in English), it used to provide jobs for over 13.000 workers, man and women as well. The neighborhood prospered in the communist regime (new houses were built, new jobs were created, tram lines were introduced), then experienced a major fallback in the 1990s ("Progresul" plant was almost closed, producing thousands of unemployers), currently, after 2004, the economical life improved (a supermarket was opened, a small church was built, banks opened agencies, "Progresul" plant was split into parts and sold out creating few but new jobs).

== Others ==
Schools:

- Day nursery: 1
- Kindergarten: 2
- General school: School no. 11, "George Coşbuc" School (formerly known as no. 20), School no. 33
- Highschool: "Constantin Brâncoveanu" High School (formerly "Progresul" Highschool)

Disambiguation: there are voices that argue that there is no Vidin-Progresul neighborhood, but two distinct neighborhoods, Vidin and Progresul.
