= Verona (name) =

Verona is a feminine given name and a surname which may refer to:

- Verona Burkhard (1910–2004), American muralist
- Verona Elder (born 1953), British former sprinter
- Verona Murphy (born c. 1971), Irish politician
- Verona Pooth (born 1968), German television personality and Miss Germany beauty pageant winner
- Verona Rose, English television presenter and actress
- Verona van de Leur (born 1985), Dutch retired artistic gymnast
- Carlos Verona (born 1992), Spanish cyclist
- Eva Verona (1905–1996), Croatian librarian and information scientist
- Guido Verona (pseudonym Guido da Verona) (1881–1939), Italian poet and novelist
- Ida Verona (1865–1925), French-language writer from the Bay of Kotor
- Joana de Verona (born 1989), Brazilian-Portuguese actress

== See also ==
- Maffeo Verona (1576–1618), Italian Renaissance painter
- Altichiero da Verona (c. 1330–c. 1390), Italian Gothic painter
- Guarino da Verona (1374–1460), Italian Renaissance humanist and translator
- Martino da Verona (died 1412), Italian painter
- Michele da Verona (1470–1536/1544), Italian Renaissance painter
- Niccolò da Verona, 15th century Italian Renaissance painter
- Stefano da Verona (c. 1379–c. 1438), Italian painter
- Euprepius of Verona (fl. 60–72 AD), Catholic saint, first Bishop of Verona
- Milo of Verona (fl. 931–955), Count (later Margrave) of Verona
- Pacificus of Verona (c. 776–844), Archdeacon of Verona
- Peter of Verona (1206–1252), Catholic saint, priest and inquisitor
- Zeno of Verona (c. 300–371 or 380), Christian saint and either Bishop of Verona or a martyr
