= Church of the Holy Archangels Michael and Gabriel, Brăila =

Orthodox church in Brăila, Romania

Church of the Holy Archangels Michael and Gabriel
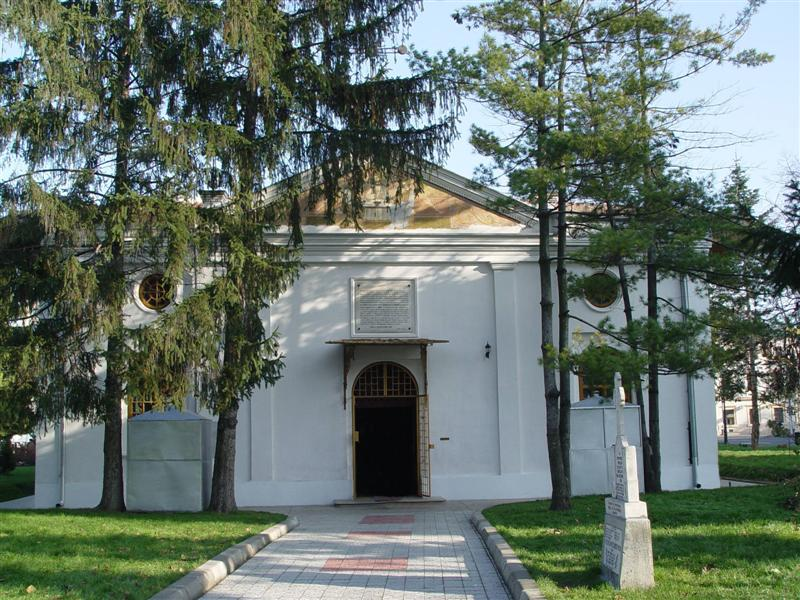
- Entrance
- Church of the Holy Archangels Michael and Gabriel
- 45.2712°N 27.9742°E
- Location: Piața Traian, Brăila, Romania
- Denomination: Romanian Orthodox

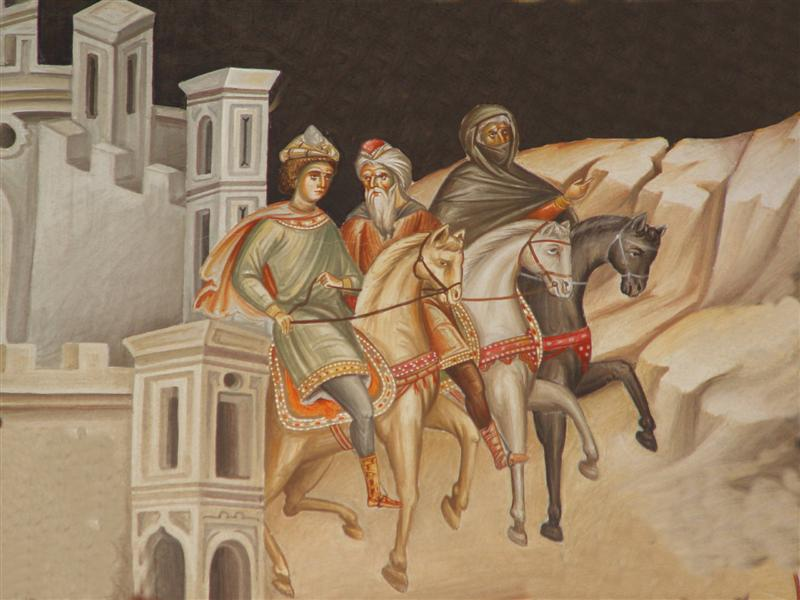
Interior fresco

The Church of the Holy Archangels Michael and Gabriel (Romanian: Biserica Sfinții Arhangheli Mihail și Gavriil), located in Piața Traian in the center of Brăila, Romania, is a Romanian Orthodox church.

== History and description ==
The oldest church in Brăila and originally a mosque, the precise period of its construction is uncertain. The lack of any Baroque ornamentation in the old part of the building suggests a date prior to 1750, when the area was under Ottoman administration as a raya. A Polish traveller mentions that a mosque was begun in 1667, contrary to international agreements, and the one eventually completed was reportedly raised in secret. It first became an Orthodox church temporarily in 1808–1810. Following the Russian victory against the Ottomans in the war of 1828–1829 and the subsequent Peace of Adrianople, which transferred the city to Wallachian control, the building became a church permanently on the initiative of Grand Duke Michael Pavlovich. The intention was to remind residents of their liberation from Turkish control, and in 1831, the Bishop of Buzău, upon the request of the Grand Duke, sent an archimandrite to bless the church. This was done on the Sunday of Orthodoxy, after an altar had been built. Today, it is the country's only former mosque converted into an Orthodox church, as well as the only church in southeastern Romania not to have domes.

The mosque was built of adobe; the church had added to it an apse of well-burned brick. The eastern windows were covered, while the narrow ones of the north and south ends were replaced by large simple ones, rounded at the top and still in place. Traces of the upper mosque windows, now blocked by bricks, can be seen beneath the masonry. In 1862, the church was expanded by 7 m to the west, giving it its current shape and dimensions. This wing includes a window similar to the other ones and side entrances to the north and south. Inside, there is an upper level in the addition. In 1922, the exterior walls were redone, the adobe replaced by pressed brick. In 1935, the persistent mouldiness of the outside walls was addressed by replacing the brick and leaving a ventilation shaft between the layers. The communist authorities wanted to demolish the church in the 1950s, and it was saved through the persistence of a priest who risked imprisonment to make numerous requests to that effect.

The adobe minaret was taken down in 1828-1829 and replaced with a wooden bell tower that burned one night in 1885. Another wooden bell tower was built, itself replaced in 1923 by the current brick one in Romanian style. In Russia, three bells were made from melted-down Turkish cannon captured during the 1829 Siege of Silistra and sent to the church. These cracked when the bell tower caught fire in 1885. They were recast by the church administration but broken and seized by the city's German occupiers in June 1917, during World War I. The two present bells were donated by the couple who also built the current bell tower.

The section that was a mosque is held up by oak pilasters, placed into the walls outside and free-standing inside. The ceiling is decorated with wooden beams in Oriental style. Its central portion was covered in stucco at some point, with the figure of Christ Pantocrator painted in the middle of the ceiling, as is customary. The iconostasis features a silver-gilt icon of the Archangel Michael, in a wooden frame. This was executed in Russia and given as a gift by Grand Duke Michael in 1834, along with a number of leather-bound religious books written in Old Church Slavonic. The icon was stolen at the beginning of the 20th century but recovered by the police. Initially dedicated to Michael alone, the name of the Archangel Gabriel was added to the church later.

The church sits on ground that was used as a cemetery during the 14th century, with nearly fifty old Christian graves discovered on the site.
