= Veronese =

Veronese is the Italian word denoting someone or something from Verona, Italy and may refer to:

- Veronese Riddle, a popular riddle in the Middle Ages
- Veronese (moth), a moth genus in the family Crambidae
- Monte Veronese, an Italian cheese made from cow's milk
- the Veronese embedding of a projective space by a complete linear system
- Veronese (typeface), Monotype typeface series 59, cut in 1911 for publisher J.M. Dent

== Places ==
- Velo Veronese, Italy
- Cavaion Veronese, Italy
- Povegliano Veronese, Italy

== People ==
- Angela Veronese (1778–1847), Italian poet
- Bonifazio Veronese (1487–1553), Italian Renaissance painter
- Paolo Veronese (1528–1588), Italian Renaissance painter in Venice
- Giuseppe Veronese (1854–1917), Italian mathematician
