= Ida Verona =

Montenegrin poet

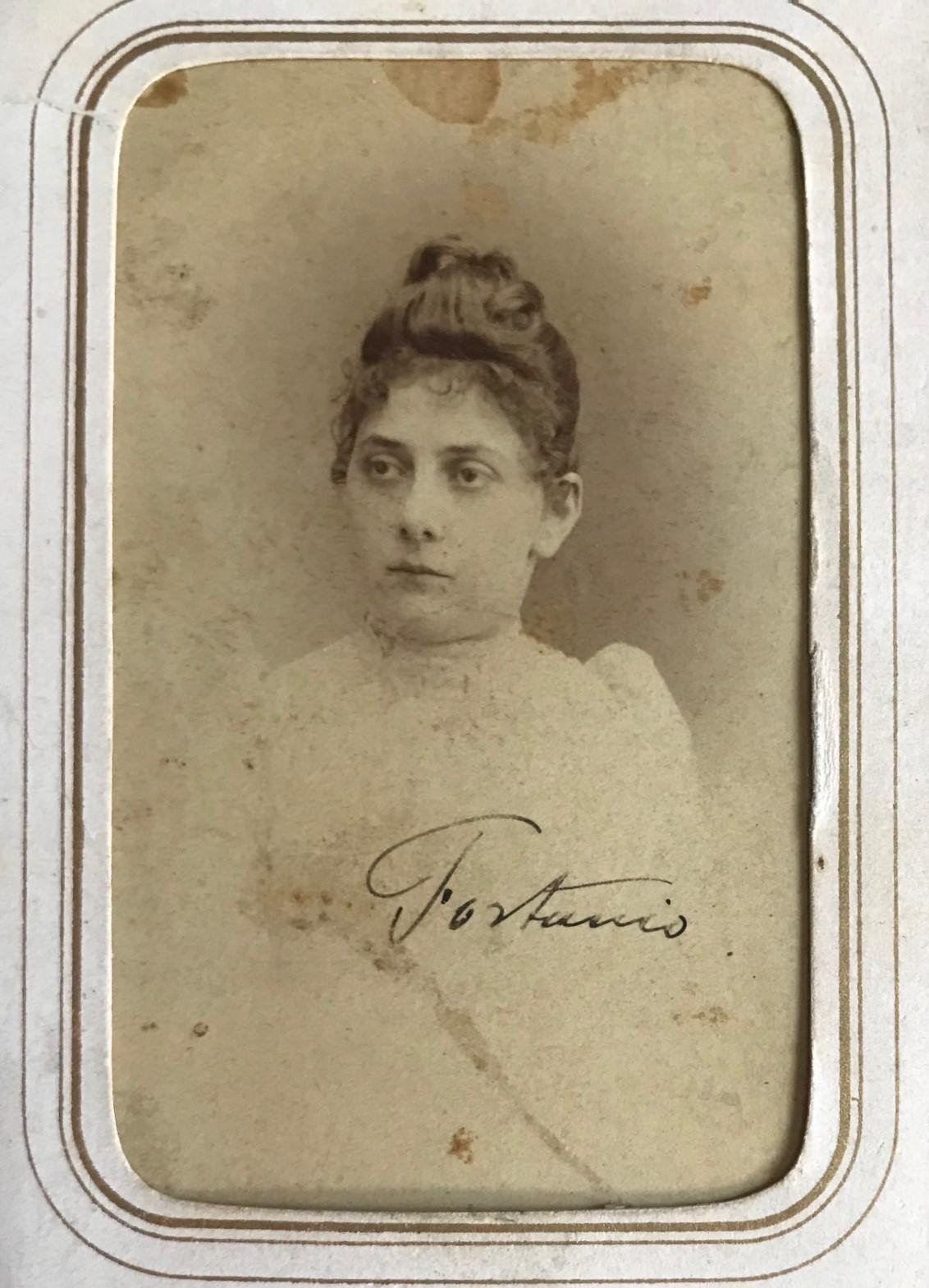
- Born: 1865; Brăila
- Died: 29 August 1925 (aged 59–60); Prčanj
- Occupation: Poet, playwright
- Relatives: Arthur Garguromin-Verona, Nicolae Henri Verona

Ida Verona (1865 – 29 August 1925) was a French-, Italian- and Romanian-language poet, playwright, and painter originating from the Bay of Kotor in today's Montenegro. She published two books of poetry and a number of plays.

== Life ==
Ida Verona was born in Brăila in 1865 (according to other sources, in 1861 or 1863), the daughter of Dalmatian merchant Francesco Spiridon Verona and Amalia Lucovič or Lucovschi. Brăila contained a colony of Dalmatians who fled the Kotor Bay area. She was educated at a Catholic school, the Notre Dame de Sion, in Brăila. Her brothers were the painters Arthur Verona and Nicolae Henri Verona. Verona was also said to be a talented painter of flowers.

Verona published two books of poetry, Quelques fleurs poétiques around 1881 and the more celebrated Mimosas, published in French in Paris in 1885, and containing 84 poems. Many of Verona's poems wrestle with the place of women in society. Verona also wrote a number of plays, including Domnitz, Fleurs de sang, Aecathe (a five-act play about Christian martyr Catherine of Alexandria), Jane d'Arc, Abdul Hamid, Creaturès d'amour, and La Tige Dace, about Decebalus, king of Dacia.

During World War I she worked as a Red Cross nurse. Eventually, she relocated to Prčanj, Montenegro to her grandfather's house and spent the rest of her life there. She died on 29 August 1925, and was buried in Prčanj. When she died, she was relatively unknown in Montenegro. It has been said that her work would have received greater appreciation during her lifetime if she had written in her native language.

== Bibliography ==
- Quelques fleurs poétiques. Brăila, no publishing house, 1882
- Mimosas. Paris: Henri Gautier, 1885.
