= Verona High School =

Verona High School may refer to:

- Verona High School (Kentucky), Verona, Kentucky, listed on the NRHP in Boone County, Kentucky
- Walton-Verona High School — Walton, Kentucky
- Verona High School (Missouri) — Verona, Missouri
- Verona High School (New Jersey) — Verona, New Jersey
- Vernon-Verona-Sherrill High School — Verona, New York
- Verona High School (North Dakota) — Verona, North Dakota
- Verona Area High School — Verona, Wisconsin
