= Brăila =

City and county seat of Brăila County, Romania

- County seat and Municipality
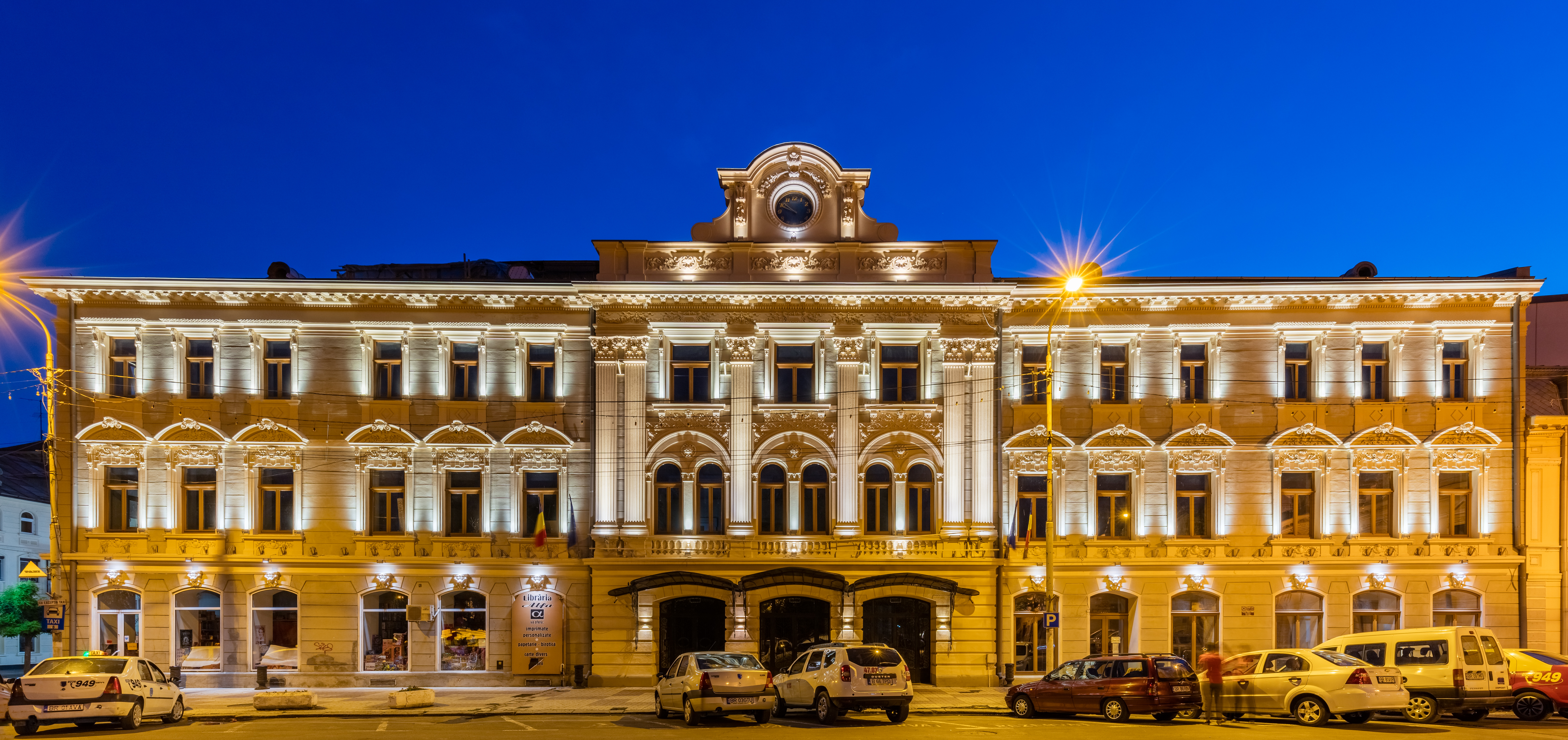
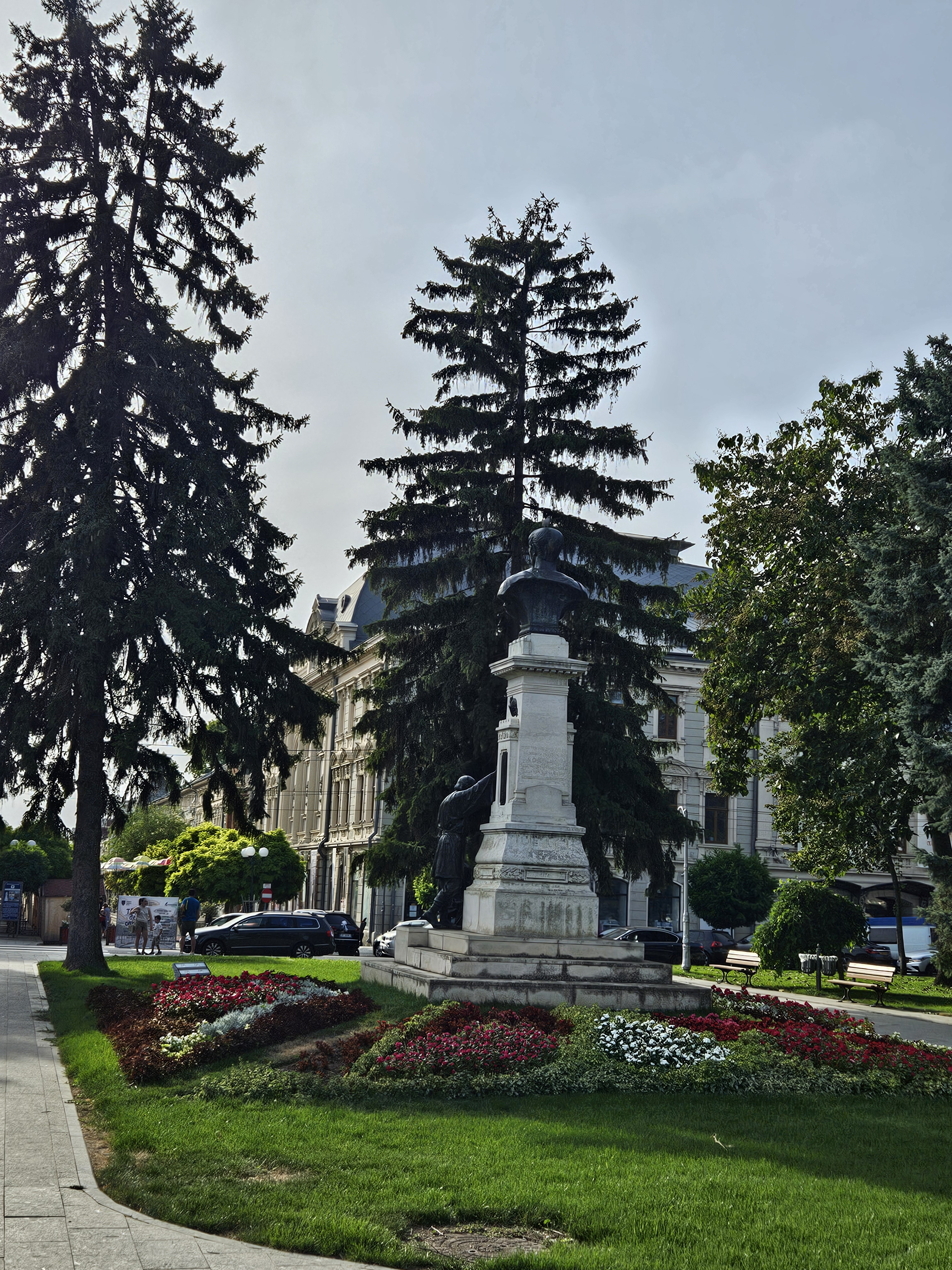
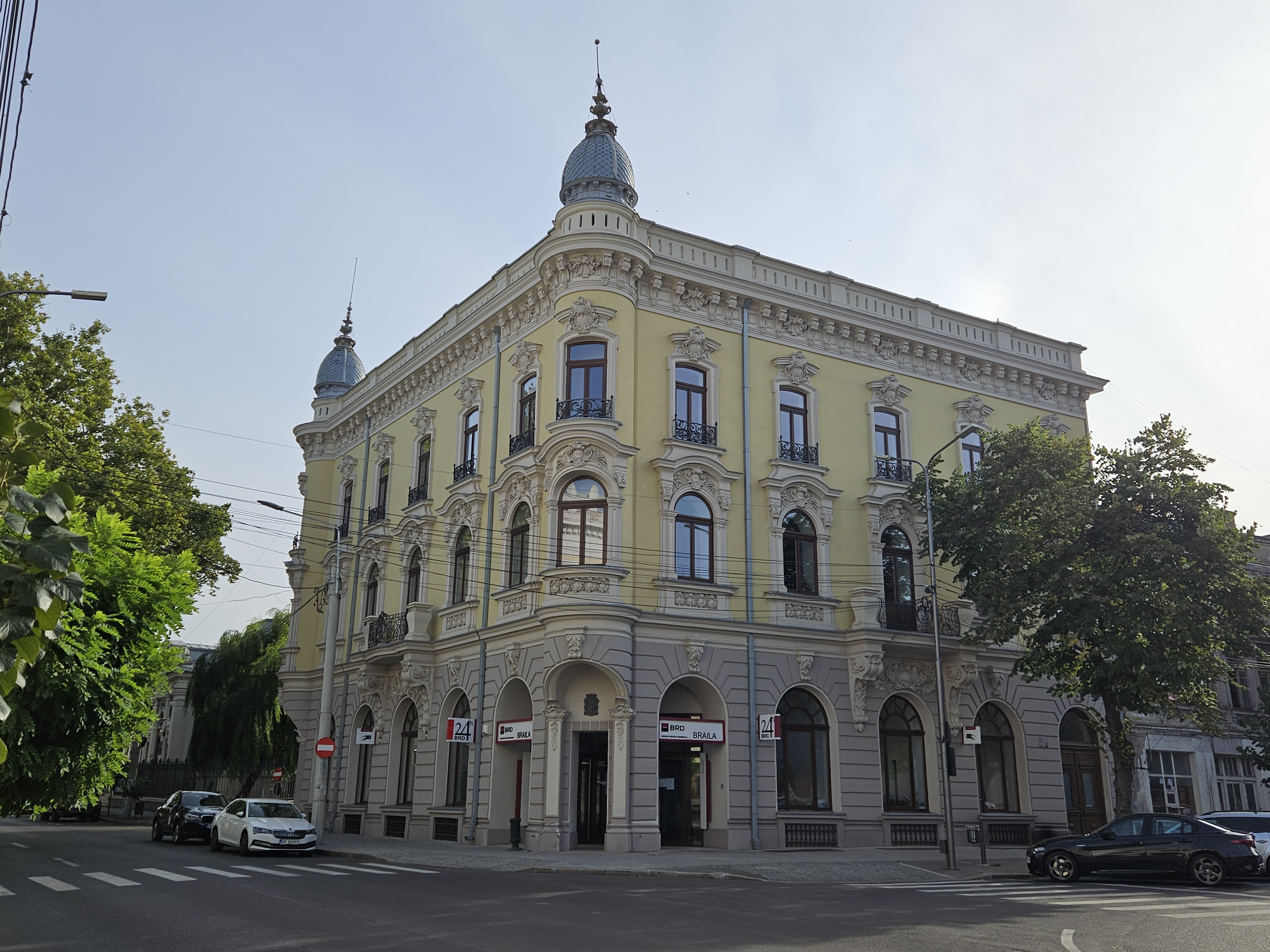
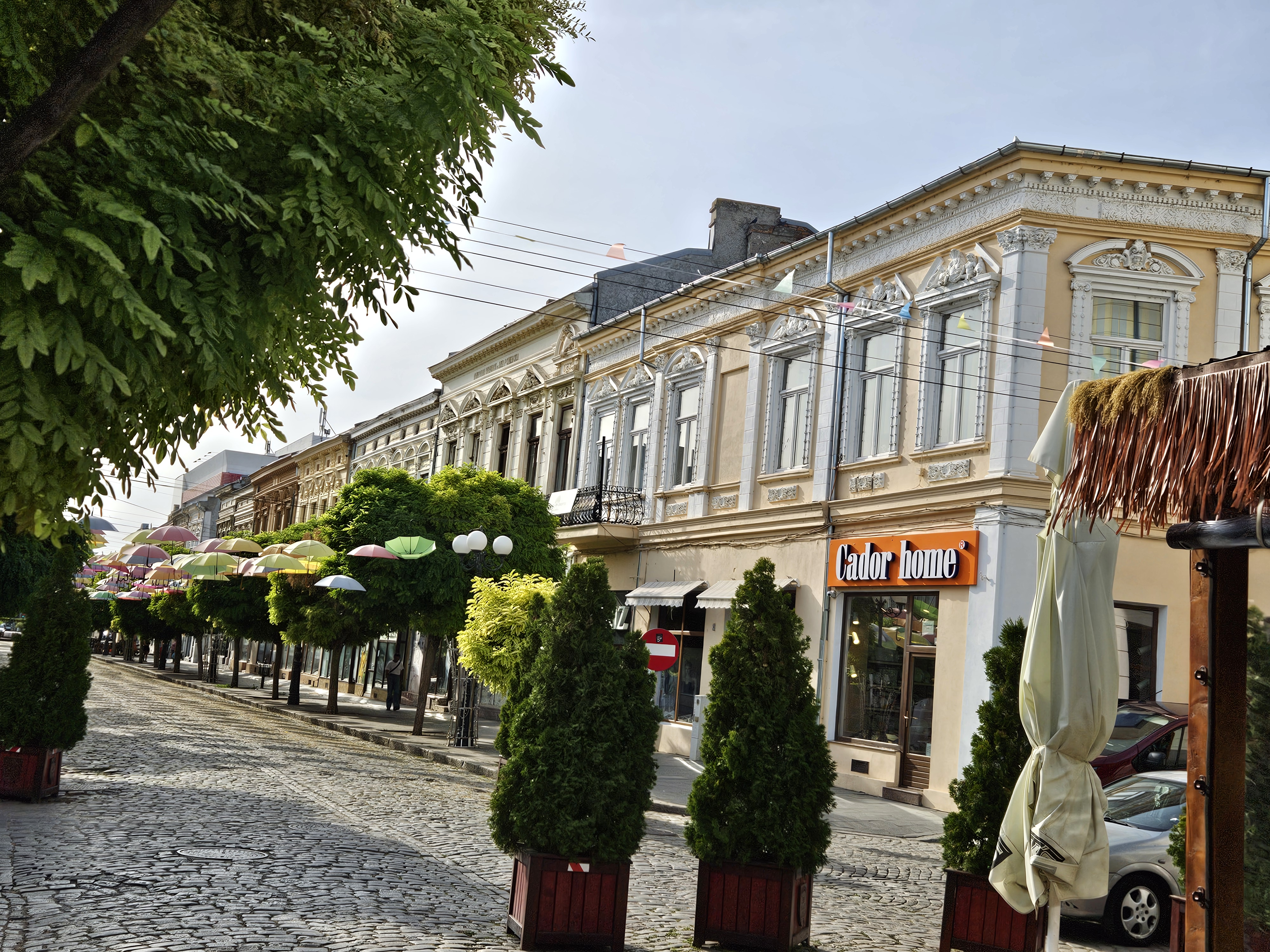
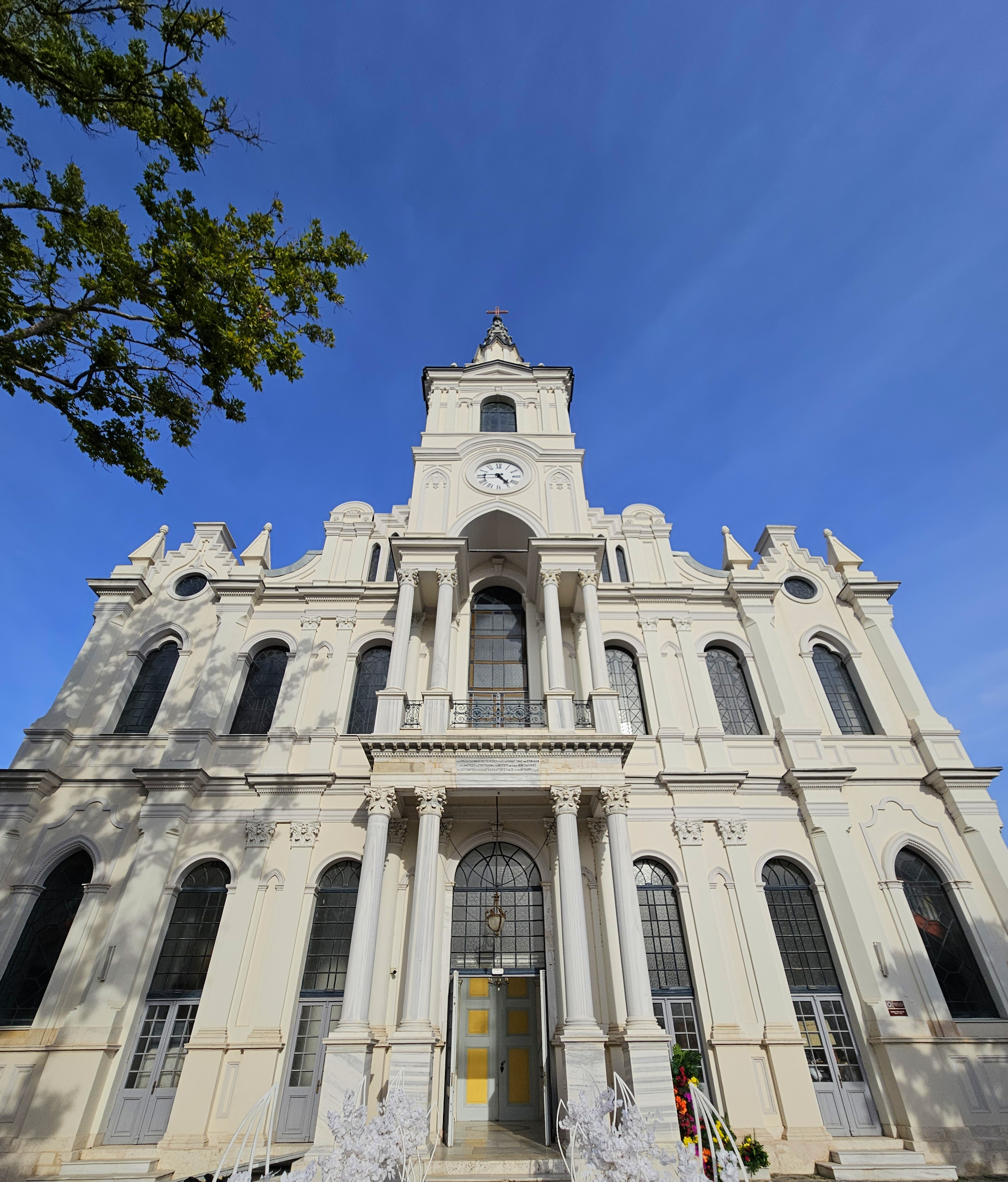
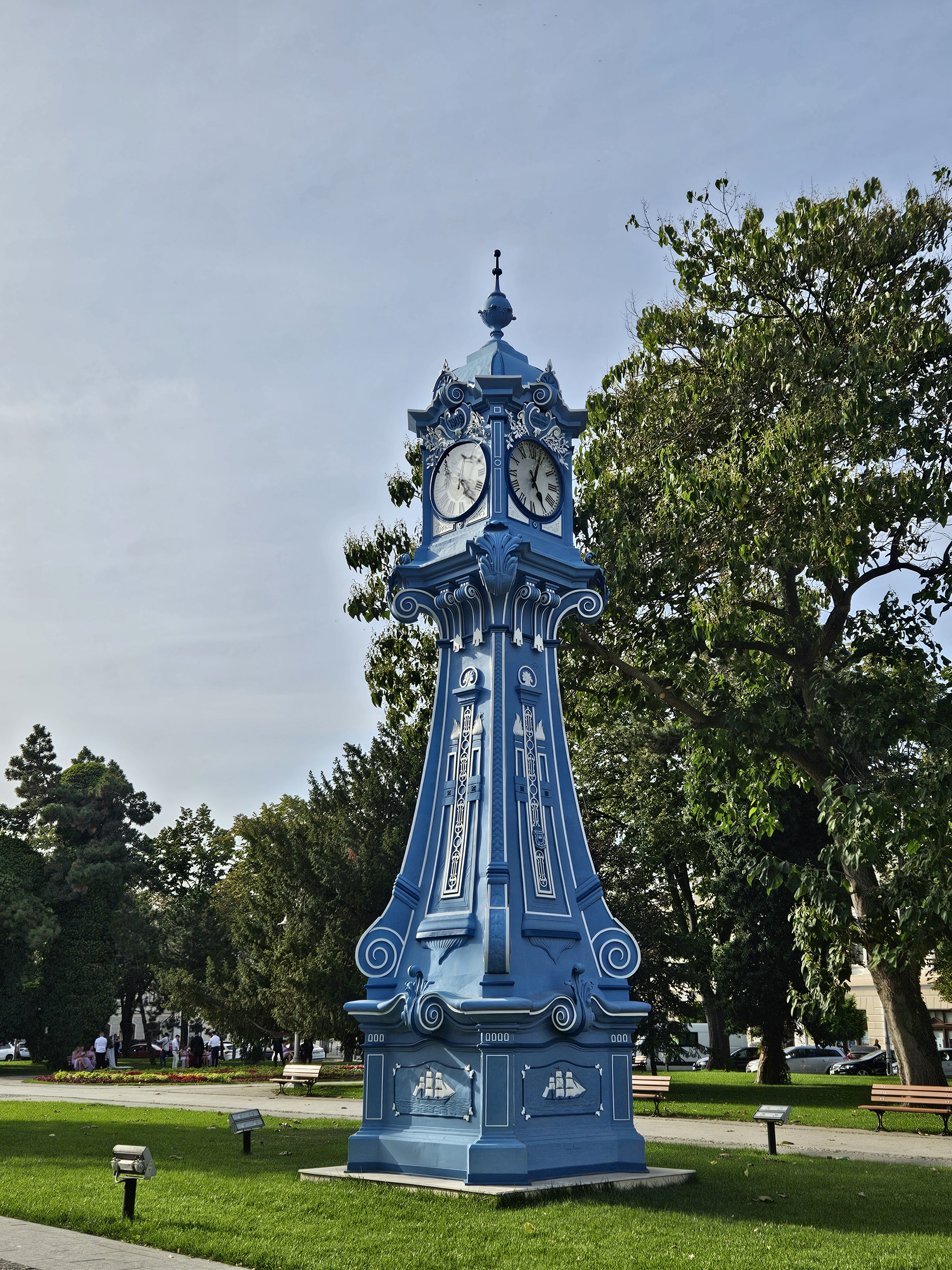
- Maria Filotti Theatre Central Square Hotel Danubiu Old town The Greek Church Public Clock Braila Bridge

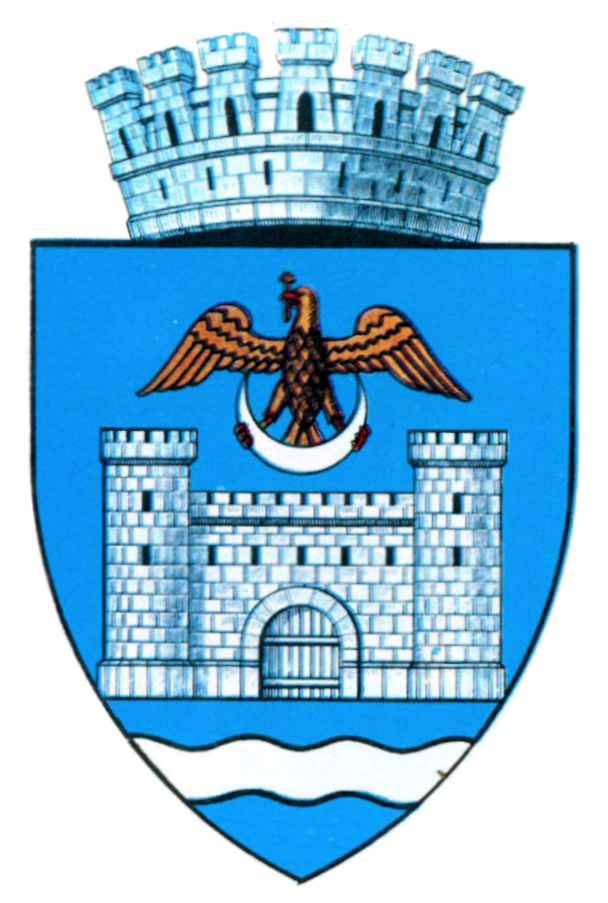
- Coat of Arms
- Nickname: The Port City on the Danube
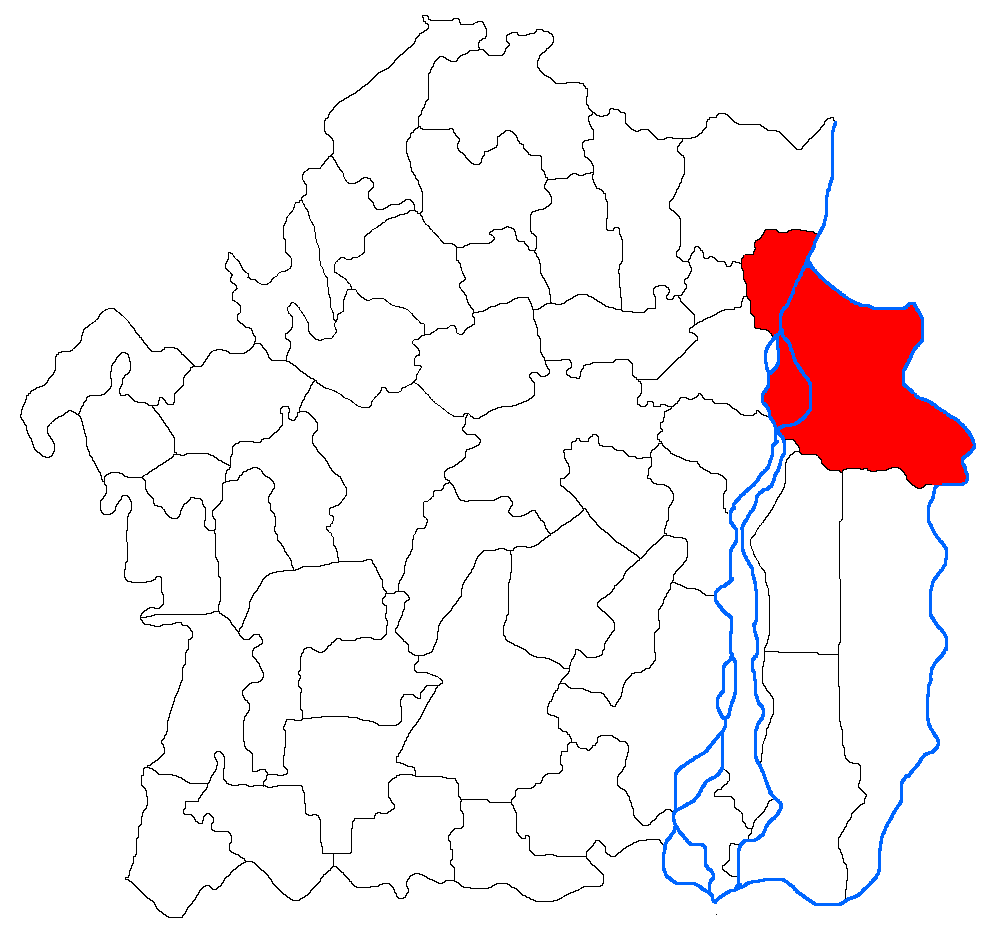
- Location in Brăila County

- Location in Romania
- Coordinates: 45°16′09.1″N 27°57′26.9″E
- Country: Romania
- County: Brăila
- Status: County seat
- First mentioned: 1368

Government
  - Mayor (2024–2028): Viorel Marian Dragomir (PSD)

Area
  - Total: 77.9 km^{2} (30.1 sq mi)
- Elevation: 25 m (82 ft)

Population (2021)
  - Total: 154,686
  - Density: 1,990/km^{2} (5,140/sq mi)
- Time zone: UTC+2 (EET)
  - Summer (DST): UTC+3 (EEST)
- Postal Code: 810xxx
- Area code: (+40) 239
- Car Plates: BR
- Climate: Dfa
- Website: www.primariabraila.ro

Brăila (/brəˈiːlə/, also US: /-lɑː/, Romanian: [brəˈila]) is a city in Muntenia, eastern Romania, a port on the Danube and the capital of Brăila County. The Sud-Est Regional Development Agency is headquartered in the city.

According to the 2021 Romanian census, Brăila had a population of 154,686 inhabitants, making it the 11th most populous city in Romania and the 9th largest on the Danube. The city's current mayor is Viorel Marian Dragomir of the PSD.

== History ==
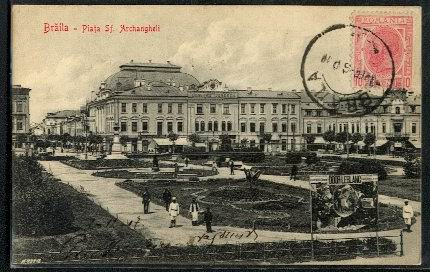
A 1900s postcard of Brăila

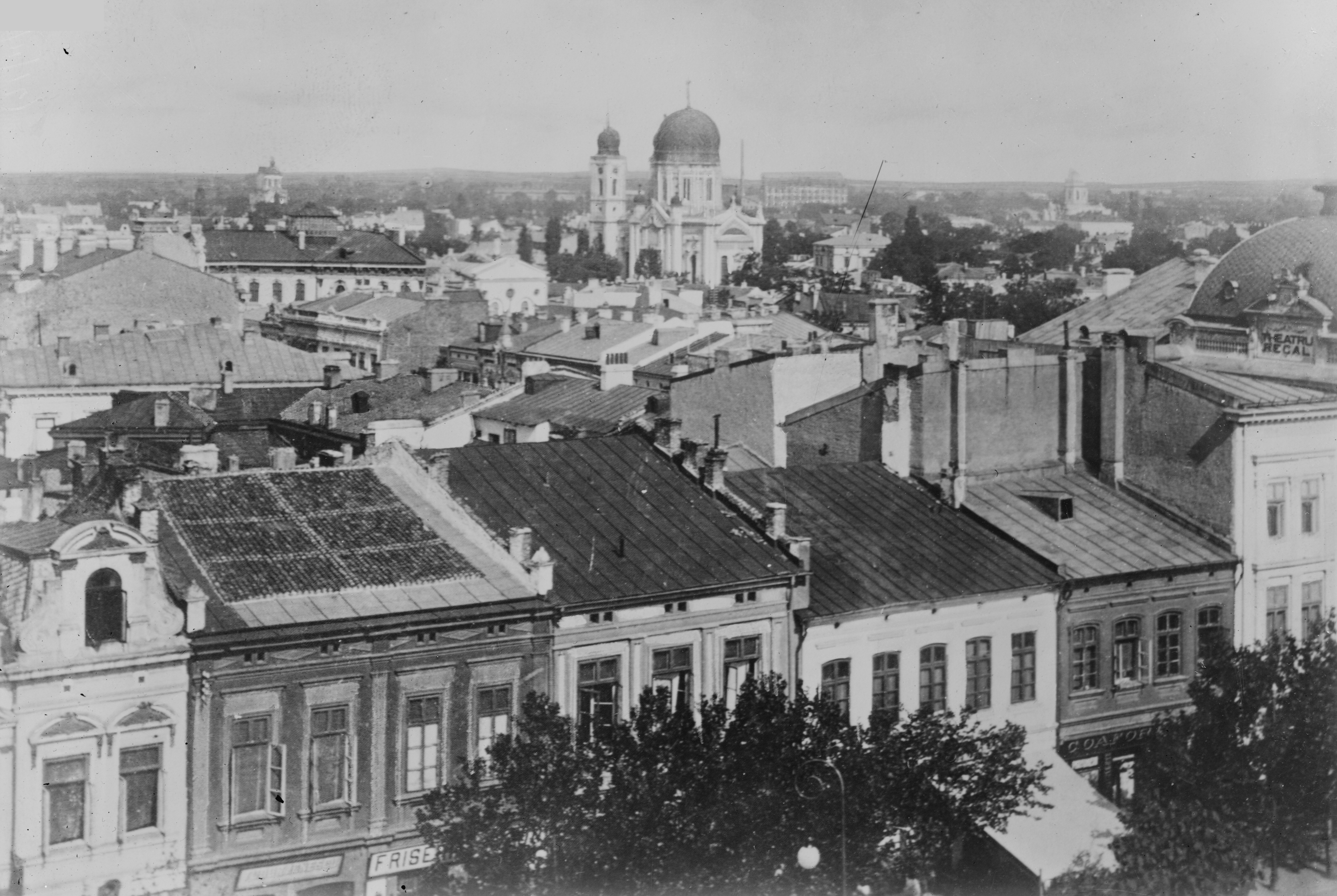
Brăila in the late 19th century or early 20th century

=== Origins ===
Before the 14th century, a small village existed in the place of today's Brăila, probably inhabited by fishermen and small merchants. The village fell to the Mongols during the 1241 Mongol invasion of Europe and it was under direct control of the rulers of Argeș in mid-14th century.

A settlement called Drinago was found in several 14th century Catalan portolan charts (Angelino de Dalorto, 1325/1330 and Angelino Dulcert, 1339), as well as in the Book of Knowledge of All Kingdoms. This may have been an erroneous transcription of Brillago, a name which was later used in 15th century traveller's journals.

In Greek documents of roughly that time, the city is referred to as Proilabum or Proilava, a Greek language adaptation of its Slavic name, Brailov. In German language sources, it is mentioned as Uebereyl. The origin and meaning of the name is unknown, but it is thought to be an anthroponym.

The first certain document mentioning Brăila is a privilege act, given by Vladislav I of Wallachia to German merchants of Brașov, who were exempt of customs duties when they followed the road from Brașov to the Danube via Braylan.

=== Wallachian harbour ===
Following the fall of Vicina, Brăila developed as the main harbour of Wallachia, gaining the town status around 1400.

In 1396, Johann Schiltberger writes that Brăila was the place where ships docked, bringing "goods from heathen lands". Foreign merchants bringing goods were forced to unload their merchandise in Brăila, as it can be understood from a 1445 account of Walerand de Wavrin. A 1520 Ottoman account tells about the arrival of 70-80 ships in Brăila, bringing goods from Asia Minor and Crimea. The town was also an important center of the fish trade: Polish merchants came to purchase it (1408) and this lucrative trade was taxed by the rulers following Vladislav I.

The town did have autonomy, being ruled by pârgari and a județ. We know little about the ethnic structure of the town, but it is expected it was quite diverse, having inhabitants from many backgrounds. One document from 1500 talks about Mihoci Latinețul, a Ragusan who had lived in Brăila for five years and was a member of the community.

In 1462, Mehmed the Conqueror's fleet of 25 triremes and 150 other ships burnt the city to the ground. The city was also caught in the conflict between Wallachia and the Moldavian prince Stephen the Great, as the Moldavians destroyed the city during the retaliation campaign against Wallachian prince Radu the Fair. An account of the Moldavian attack is found in Cronica breviter scripta:

much blood was shed, and the town burned to the ground, not leaving even the children of mothers to live, and sliced open the breasts of mothers and ripped the children from them

The conflict was not just political, as the town of Brăila competed against Moldavian town of Chilia. Nevertheless, Brăila recovered, soon becoming the gateway for Levantine goods into Wallachia. The town was burnt again by Bogdan III of Moldavia in 1512.

=== Ottoman harbour ===
Around 1538–1540, perhaps during the Suleiman the Magnificent's military expedition against Petru Rareș, the city became a part of the Ottoman Empire, being organized as a kaza and forming part of the Silistra Eyalet. The town was part of the Empire's northern defensive network and the Ottomans built a stone stronghold in the town.

The Ottoman Empire ruled it from 1538–1540 until 1829; the Ottomans called it Ibrail or Ibraila. It was briefly ruled by Michael the Brave, prince of Wallachia (1595–1596) before it was recaptured by the Ottomans.

=== Modern history ===
In 1711, the city was besieged and conquered by a Wallachian-Russian army during the Pruth River Campaign. In 1828, the siege of Brăila took place. The following year, it was officially granted to Wallachia by the Treaty of Adrianople.

During the 19th century, the port became one of the three most important ports on the Danube in Wallachia, the other two being Turnu and Giurgiu. The city's greatest period of prosperity was at the end of the 19th century and in the early 20th century, when it was an important port for most of the merchandise coming in and going out of Romania. In 1912, Brăila had 65,711 residents and during the Interwar period when the population was around 68,000, the city had a Jewish population of about 11,000 (16.1%) and a Greek population of about 5,000 (7.35%).

During World War II, Brăila was captured on 28 August 1944 by Soviet troops of the 3rd Ukrainian Front in the course of the Jassy–Kishinev Offensive.

After the 1989 Revolution, Brăila entered a period of economic decline.

== Demographics ==
Historical population
Year	Pop.	±%
1859	15,767	—
1900	58,392	+270.3%
1912	65,053	+11.4%
1930	68,347	+5.1%
1941	99,531	+45.6%
1948	95,514	−4.0%
1956	102,500	+7.3%
1966	138,802	+35.4%
1977	194,633	+40.2%
1992	234,110	+20.3%
2002	216,292	−7.6%
2011	180,302	−16.6%
2021	154,686	−14.2%
Censuses data, 1930–1948.

At the 2021 census, Brăila had a population of 154,686, a decrease from the figure recorded at the 2011 census. The ethnic makeup was as follows (as of 2011):

- Romanians: 97.21%
- Lipovans: 1.14%
- Roma: 0.97%
- Greeks: 0.1%
- Other: 0.3%

== Geography ==
Brăila is part of the strategically important Focșani Gate.

== Economy ==
Accessible to small and medium-sized oceangoing ships, Brăila has large grain-handling and warehousing facilities. It is also an important industrial center, with metalworking, textile, food-processing, and other factories. The naval industry is one of the focus of Brăila's revenue bringers.

== Cityscape ==
Brăila has the following districts: Centru (Center), Viziru (1, 2, 3), Călărași 4, Ansamblul Buzăului, Radu Negru, Obor, Hipodrom, Lacu Dulce, Dorobanți, 1 Mai, Comorofca, Calea Galați, Gării, Apollo, Siret, Pisc, Brăilița, Vidin-Progresul, Islaz, and Chercea.

== Landmarks ==
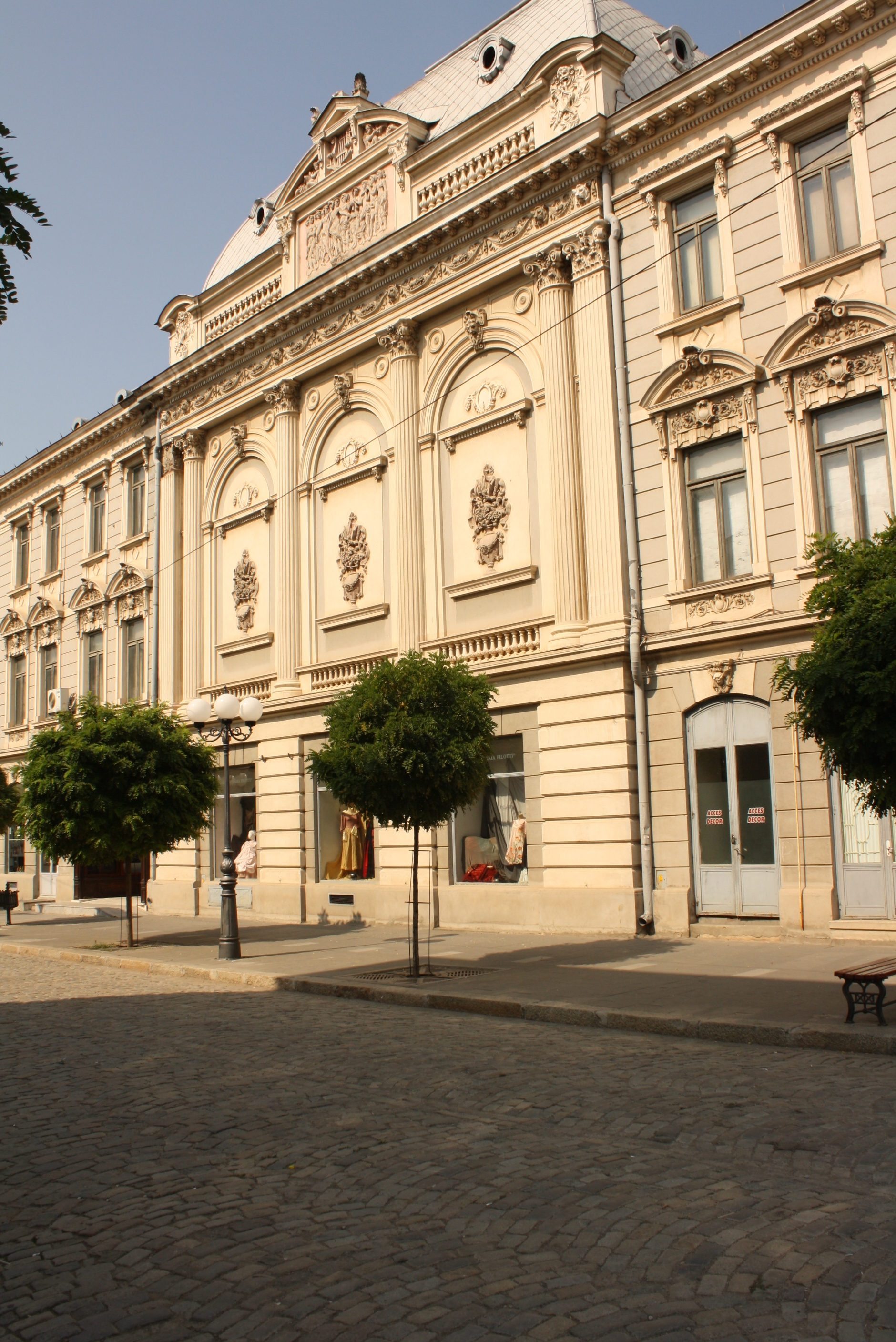
Maria Filotti Theatre

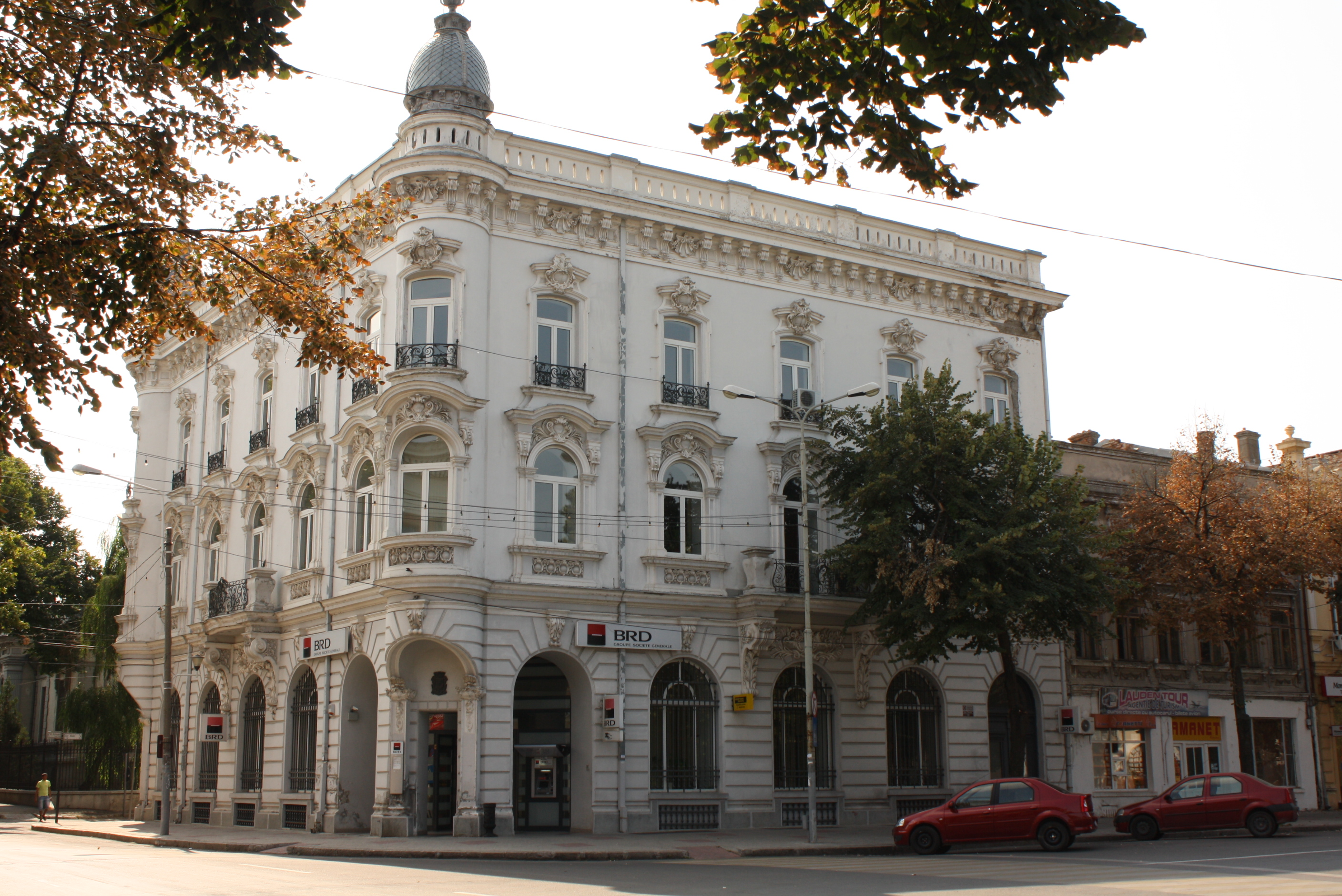
Hotel Danubiu in Traian Square

Streets radiating from near the port towards Brăila's center are crossed at symmetrical intervals by concentric streets following the geometric design of the old Ottoman fortifications.

The old center of the city has many 19th-century buildings, some of them fully restored. The most important monuments are the Greek Church, erected in 1863–1872 by the Greek community; the Church of the Holy Archangels Michael and Gabriel, former jāmi during the Ottoman rule (until 1831) and oldest church in the city; the 19th-century St. Nicholas Church; the Maria Filotti Theatre; the Palace of Culture and its Art Museum; the History Museum; and the old Water Tower. The latter houses a restaurant and a rotation system (360° in one hour). Still, the city has some landmarks from the 20th century, such as the Palace of Agriculture.

Another important site is the Public Garden, a park situated above the bank of the Danube with a view over the river and the Măcin Mountains. Early in 2006 the municipality received European Union funds to renovate the old center of the city, aiming to transform Brăila into a major tourist attraction of Muntenia.

The other important park of the city is the Monument Park, one of the largest urban parks in Romania, covering an area of up to 90 hectares (220 acres). The park is home to the Natural Science permanent exhibition of Brăila Museum, hosting several dioramas that depict the flora and fauna of the region.

The city also hosts an Armenian Apostolic church from the 19th century, the St. Mary Armenian Church.

== Transportation ==
Brăila features one of the oldest electrical tram lines in Romania, inaugurated at the end of the 19th century and still in use. Brăila's bus system is operated by the town hall in cooperation with Braicar Company, with four primary bus configurations available servicing most of the city. Brăila also has a railway station.

== Culture ==
=== Local media ===
The city has several local newspapers, including Obiectiv-Vocea Brăilei, Monitorul de Brăila, Ziarul de Brăila and Arcașu'.

=== Rivalry with Galați ===
Brăila has a deep rivalry with neighbouring Galați. This conflict has a long history and has reached the point of being studied by academics. In fact, a group of Romanian researchers have already published the book Galați – Brăila. Trecut. Actualitate. Perspective ("Galați – Brăila. Past. Present. Perspectives").

== Notable people ==
- Petre Andrei
- Ana Aslan
- Anton Bacalbașa
- George Baronzi
- Daniela Buruiană
- Beatrice Câșlaru
- Alexandru Chipciu
- Georgia Crăciun
- Anișoara Cușmir-Stanciu
- Hariclea Darclée
- Catrinel Dumitrescu
- Constantin von Economo
- Andreas Embirikos
- Gabriela Enache
- Maria Filotti
- Liviu Floda
- Pnina Granirer
- Paulică Ion
- Nae Ionescu
- Panait Istrati
- Joseph M. Juran
- Antigone Kefala
- Valentin Mavrodin
- Manea Mănescu
- Ștefan Mihăilescu-Brăila
- Gheorghe Mihoc
- Mina Minovici
- Diana Mocanu
- Petru Mocanu
- Jean Moscopol
- Serge Moscovici
- Valeriu Niculescu
- Perpessicius
- Alina Popa
- Camelia Potec
- Nicolae Rainea
- Johnny Răducanu
- Eugen Schileru
- Mihail Sebastian
- Tudorel Stoica
- Costică Toma
- Christos Tsaganeas
- Andrei Tudor
- Mihai Tudose
- Ida Verona
- Ilarie Voronca
- Eléna Wexler-Kreindler
- Iannis Xenakis
- Marius Zirra

== International relations ==
=== Twin towns – sister cities ===
Brăila is twinned with:

- Pleven in Bulgaria.
- Shumen in Bulgaria.
- Calais in France.
- Argostoli in Greece.
- Katerini in Greece.
- Bitola in North Macedonia.
- Kavadarci in North Macedonia.
- Denizli in Turkey.
- Nilüfer in Turkey.
- Beşiktaş in Turkey.

== Image gallery ==
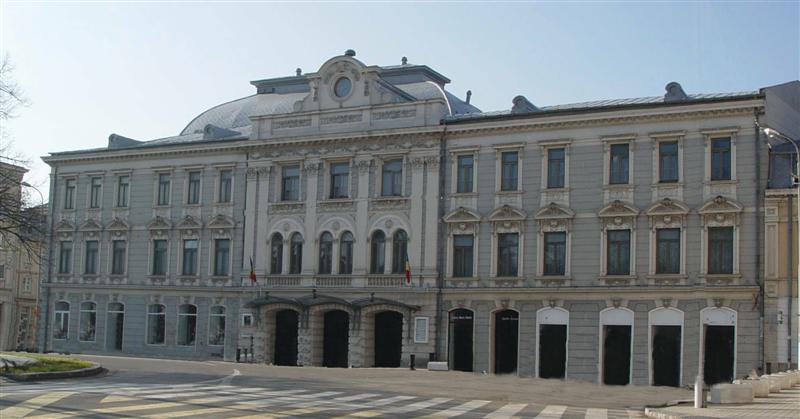

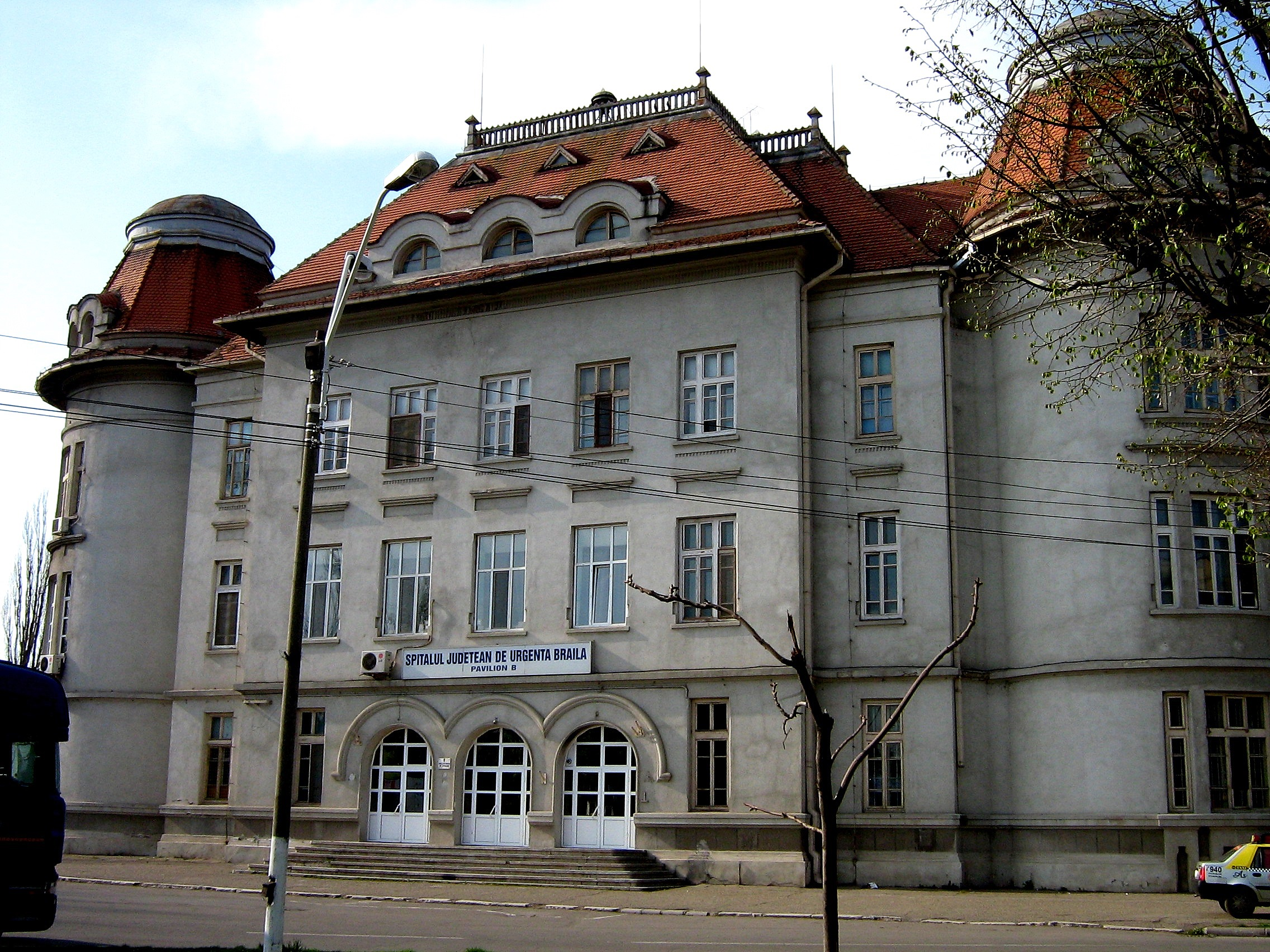

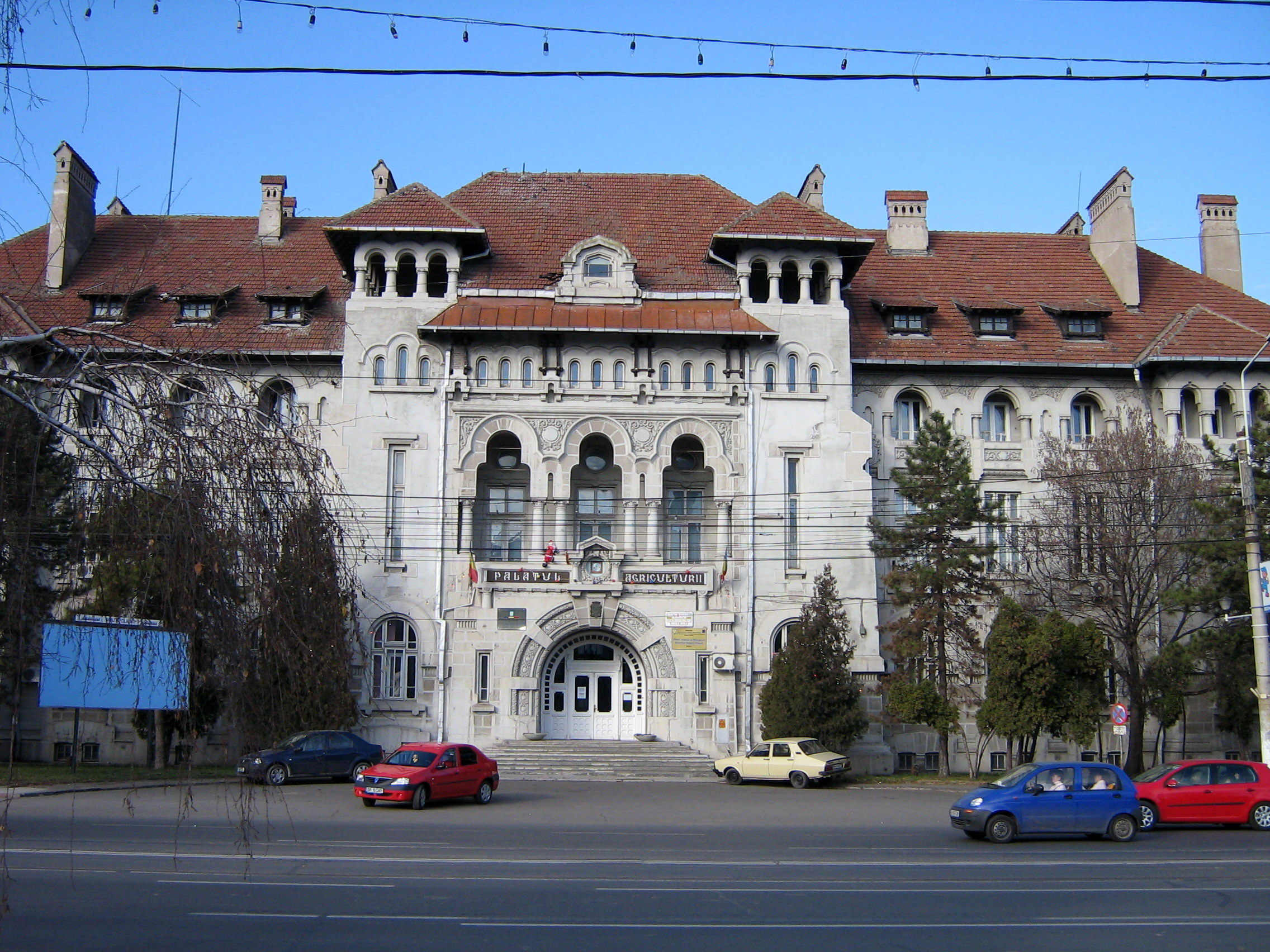

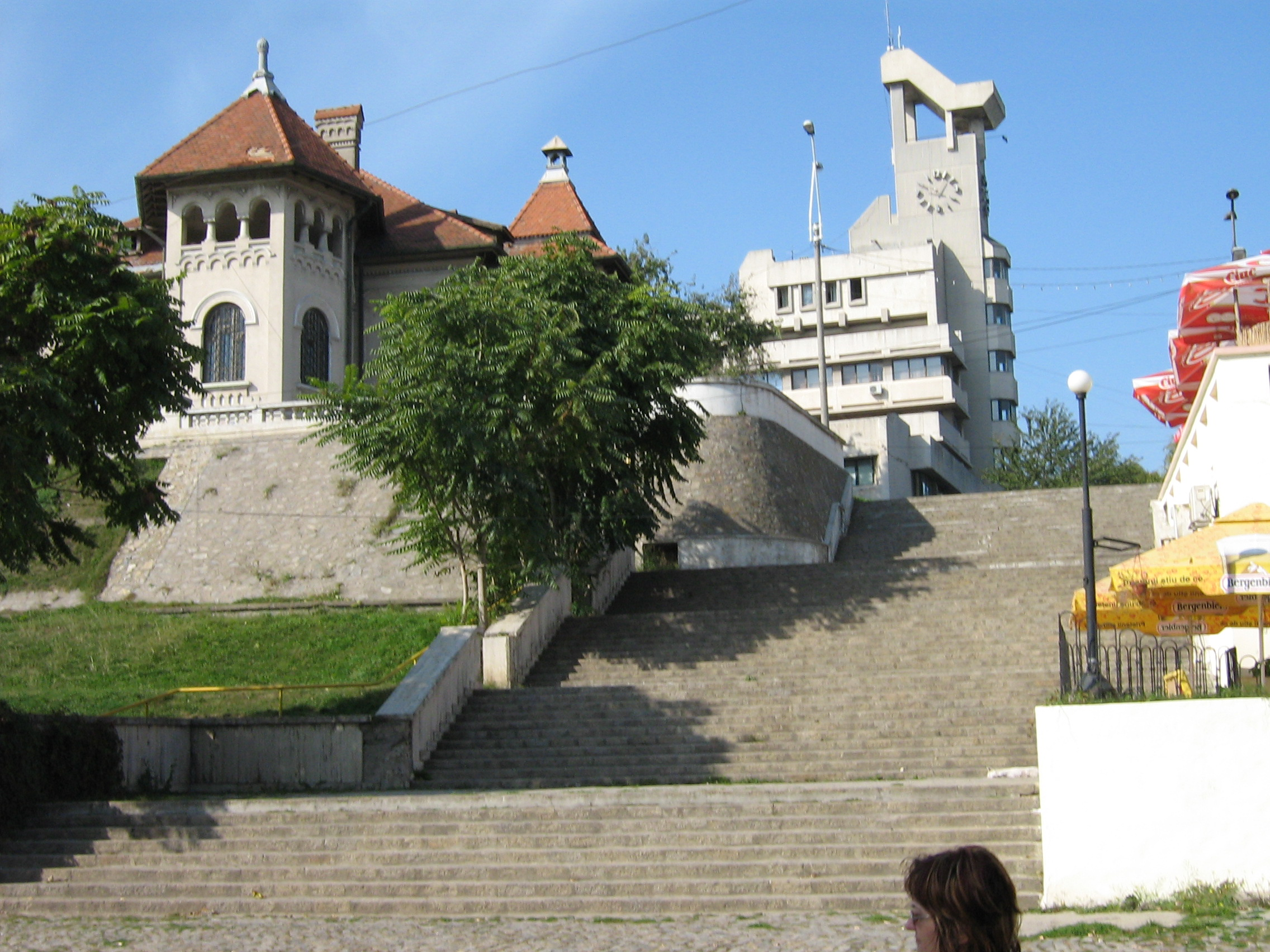

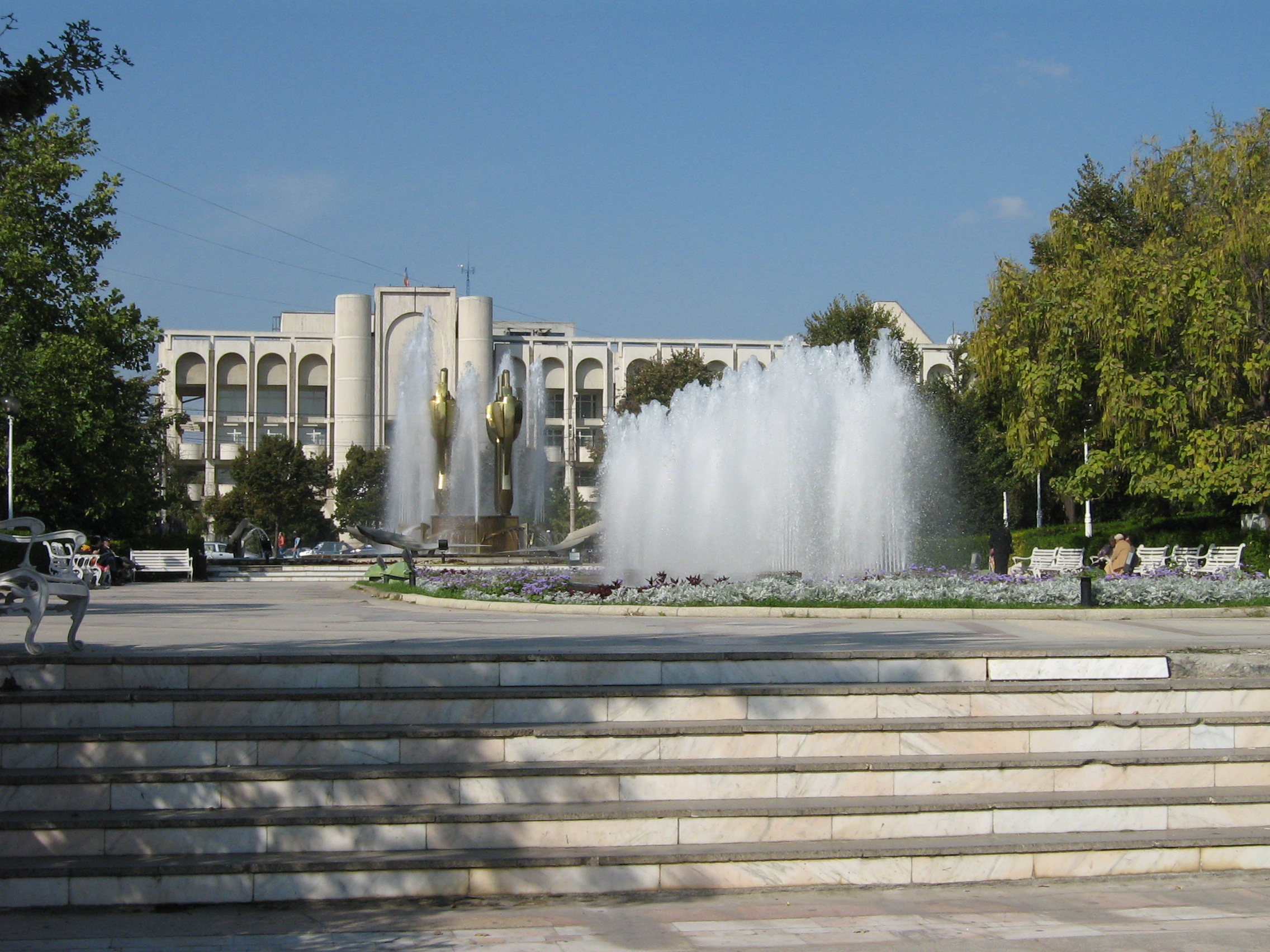

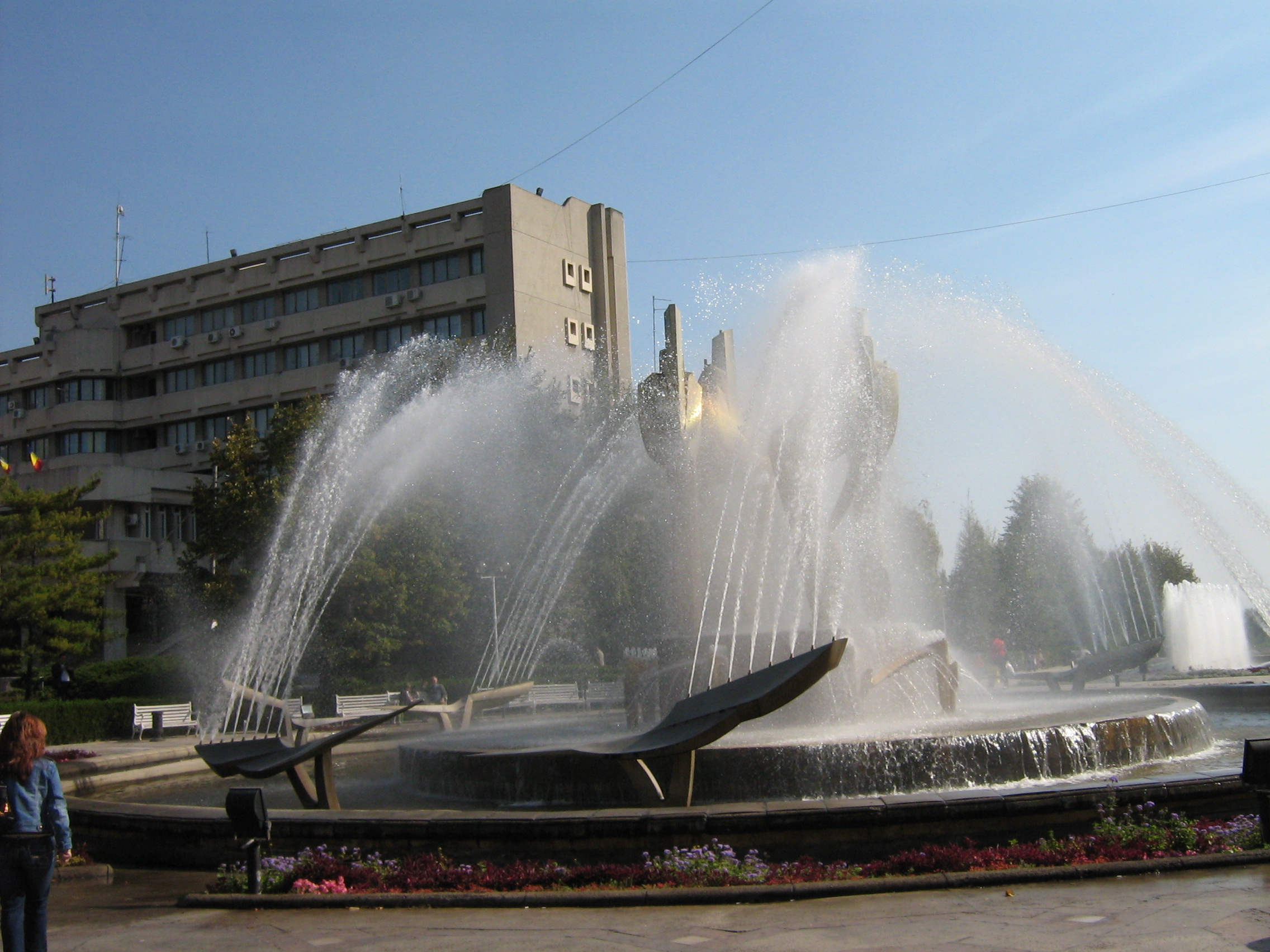

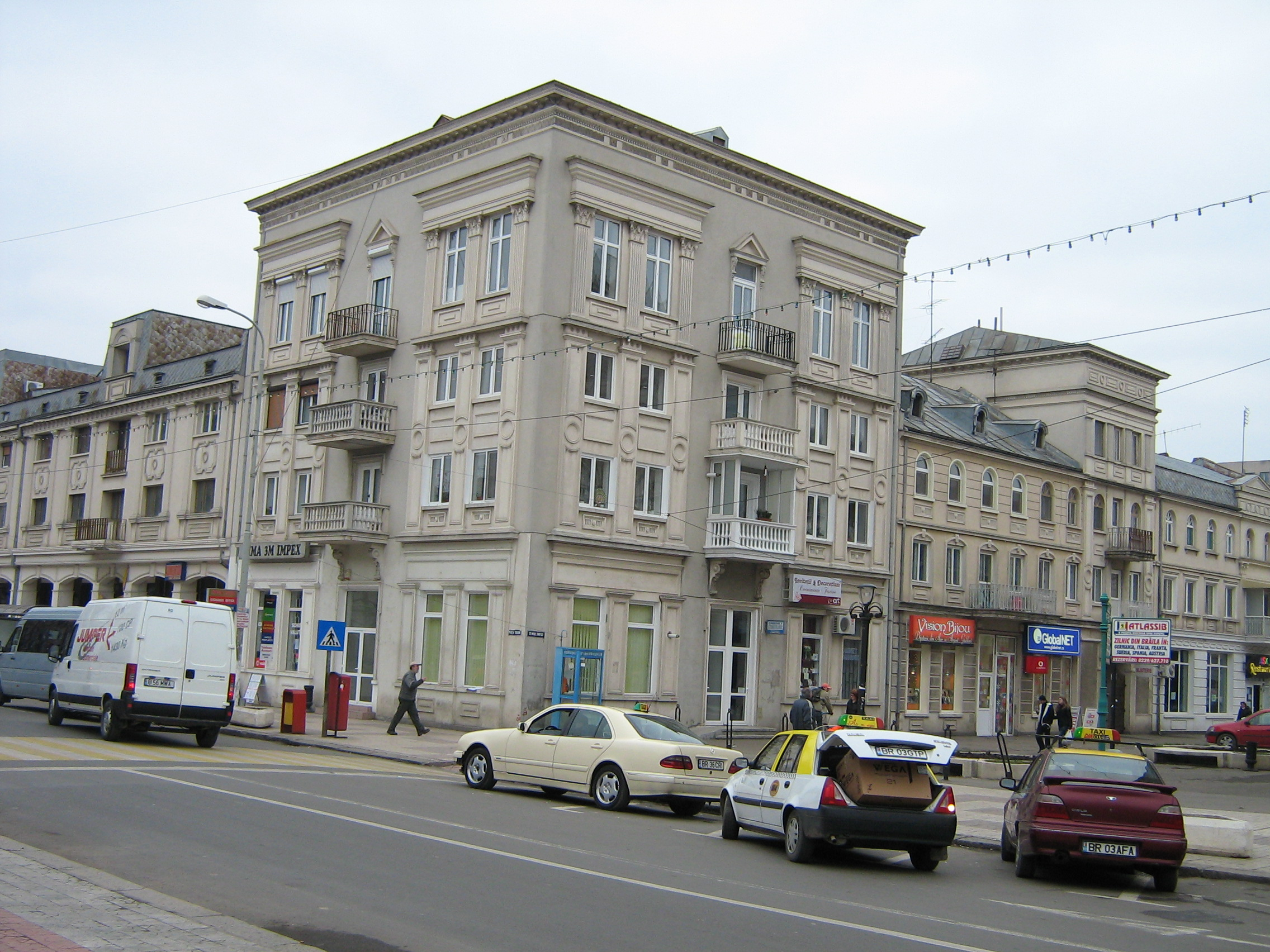

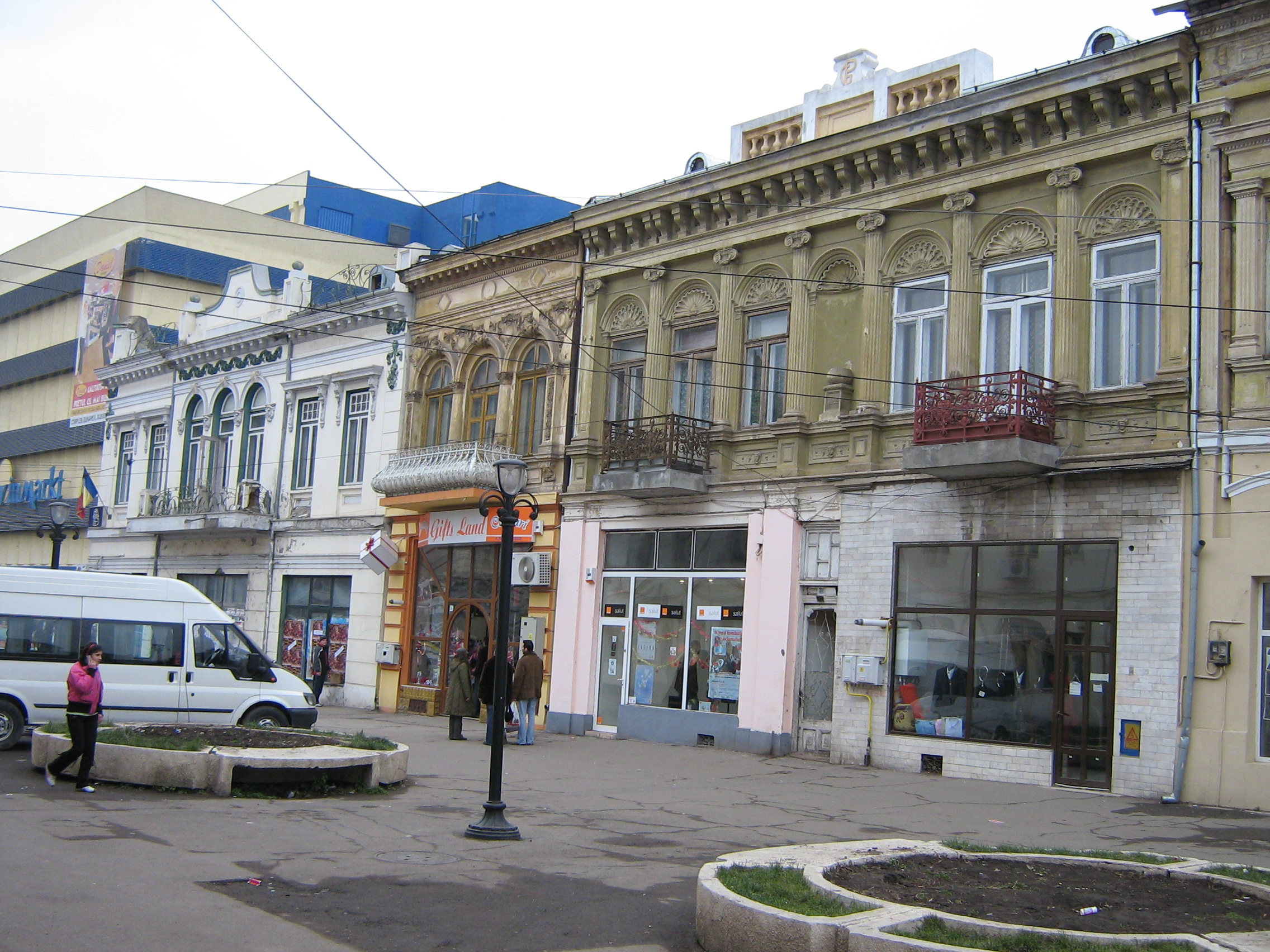

== See also ==
- Brailiv, rural settlement in Vinnytsia Oblast, Ukraine
- Brailovsky (spelled variously), surname derived from Brailov, the Russian name of the Ukrainian village of Brailiv
