= Mayor of Brăila =

Head of the Brăila City Hall

Mayor of the Municipality of Brăila
- Romanian: Primarul Municipiului Brăila
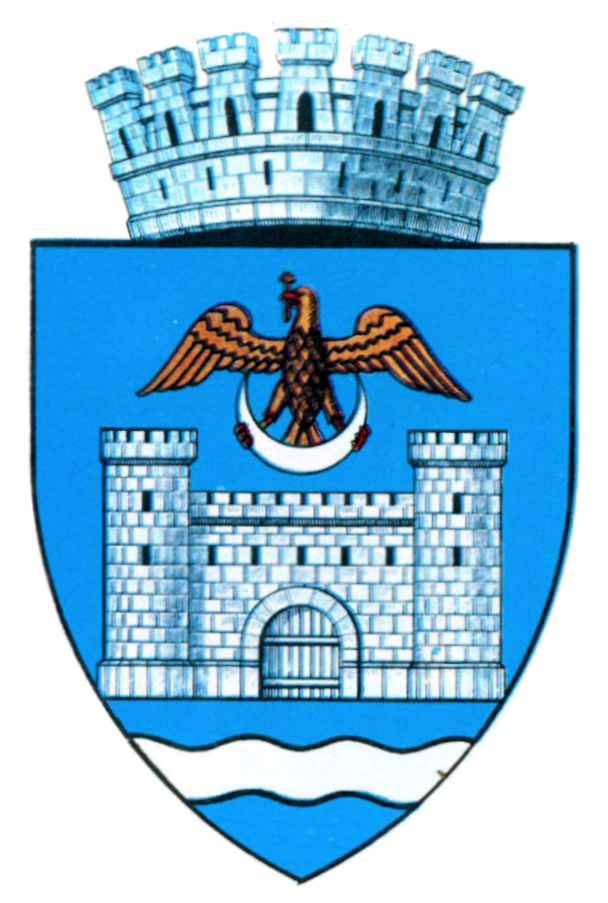
- Coat of arms of Brăila
- Incumbent; Viorel Marian Dragomir since 27 September 2020
- Term length: Four years
- Website: Official website

The mayor of Brăila, officially the Mayor of the Municipality of Brăila (Romanian: Primarul Municipiului Brăila), is the head of the Brăila City Hall in Brăila, Romania. The current mayor of Brăila is PSD member Viorel Marian Dragomir, who was elected in the 2020 Romanian local elections with over 50% of the votes. This is his second term, as he already was the mayor of the city from 2016 to 2020.
