= Battle of Verona =

Battle of Verona may refer to:

- Battle of Verona (249) where Decius led the Danubian legions to defeat and kill Emperor Philip
- Battle of Verona (312) that pitted Constantine I against one of Maxentius's commanders
- Battle of Verona (402) that pitted Stilicho against Alaric I and his Visigoths
- Battle of Verona (489) between Odovacar and the Ostrogoths led by Theodoric the Great
- Battle of Verona (1799) between the French and Pál Kray's Austrians
- Battle of Verona (1805) between André Masséna's French and Archduke Charles, Duke of Teschen's Austrians
