= Verona Township, Faribault County, Minnesota =

Township in Minnesota, United States

Verona Township
- Township
- Location within the state of Minnesota Verona Township (the United States)
- Coordinates: 43°43′14″N 94°11′57″W
- Country: United States
- State: Minnesota
- County: Faribault

Area
  - Total: 35.5 sq mi (91.9 km^{2})
  - Land: 35.4 sq mi (91.8 km^{2})
  - Water: 0 sq mi (0.0 km^{2})
- Elevation: 1,099 ft (335 m)

Population (2000)
  - Total: 391
  - Density: 11/sq mi (4.3/km^{2})
- Time zone: UTC-6 (Central (CST))
  - Summer (DST): UTC-5 (CDT)
- FIPS code: 27-66946
- GNIS feature ID: 0665865

Verona Township is a township in Faribault County, Minnesota, United States. The population was 391 at the 2000 census.

Verona Township was organized in 1858, and named after Verona, in Italy.

== Geography ==
According to the United States Census Bureau, the township has a total area of 35.5 square miles (91.9 km^{2}), of which 35.5 square miles (91.8 km^{2}) is land and 0.03% is water.

== Demographics ==
As of the census of 2000, there were 391 people, 158 households, and 118 families residing in the township. The population density was 11.0 people per square mile (4.3/km^{2}). There were 168 housing units at an average density of 4.7/sq mi (1.8/km^{2}). The racial makeup of the township was 99.74% White, and 0.26% from two or more races. Hispanic or Latino of any race were 0.26% of the population.

There were 158 households, out of which 25.9% had children under the age of 18 living with them, 69.6% were married couples living together, 3.2% had a female householder with no husband present, and 24.7% were non-families. 22.8% of all households comprised individuals, and 11.4% had someone living alone who was 65 years of age or older. The average household size was 2.47 and the average family size was 2.86.

In the township the population was spread out, with 23.0% under the age of 18, 8.2% from 18 to 24, 20.5% from 25 to 44, 30.2% from 45 to 64, and 18.2% who were 65 years of age or older. The median age was 44 years. For every 100 females, there were 97.5 males. For every 100 females age 18 and over, there were 102.0 males.

The median income for a household in the township was $42,750, and the median income for a family was $53,333. Males had a median income of $27,188 versus $17,000 for females. The per capita income for the township was $19,690. About 6.7% of families and 12.6% of the population were below the poverty line, including 24.0% of those under age 18 and 8.3% of those age 65 or over.
