= Brailovsky =

Brailovsky, Brailovski, Brailowski or Brailowsky (Russian: Брайловский or Браи́ловский, Ukrainian: Браїло́вський) is a Slavic masculine surname, often of Jewish origin, its feminine counterpart being Brailovskaya (-owscaya, -ovscaya, -ovscaia). It is derived from Brailov, the Russian name of the Ukrainian village of Brailiv. Brailovsky etc. may refer to

- Alexander Brailowsky (1896–1976), Ukrainian-born French pianist
- Daniel Brailovsky (born 1958), Argentine-born Israeli footballer and manager
- Harry Brailovsky Alperowits (born 1946), Mexican biologist
- Leonid Brailovsky, Ukrainian: Леонід Михайлович Браїло́вський (1867–1937), Russian architect, artist, designer, decorator and teacher
- Raquel Brailowsky, Puerto Rican anthropologists
- Rimma Brailovskaya (1877–1959), Russian painter
- Victor Brailovsky (born 1935), Israeli computer scientist, aliyah activist and politician
- Yevgeny Brailovsky (born 1984), Russian skier

== See also ==
- Brailiv, rural settlement in Vinnytsia Oblast, Ukraine
- Brăila, city in Muntenia, Romania
