= Elena Poliakova =

Ballet dancer and teacher (1884–1972)

- Елена Дмитриевна Полякова
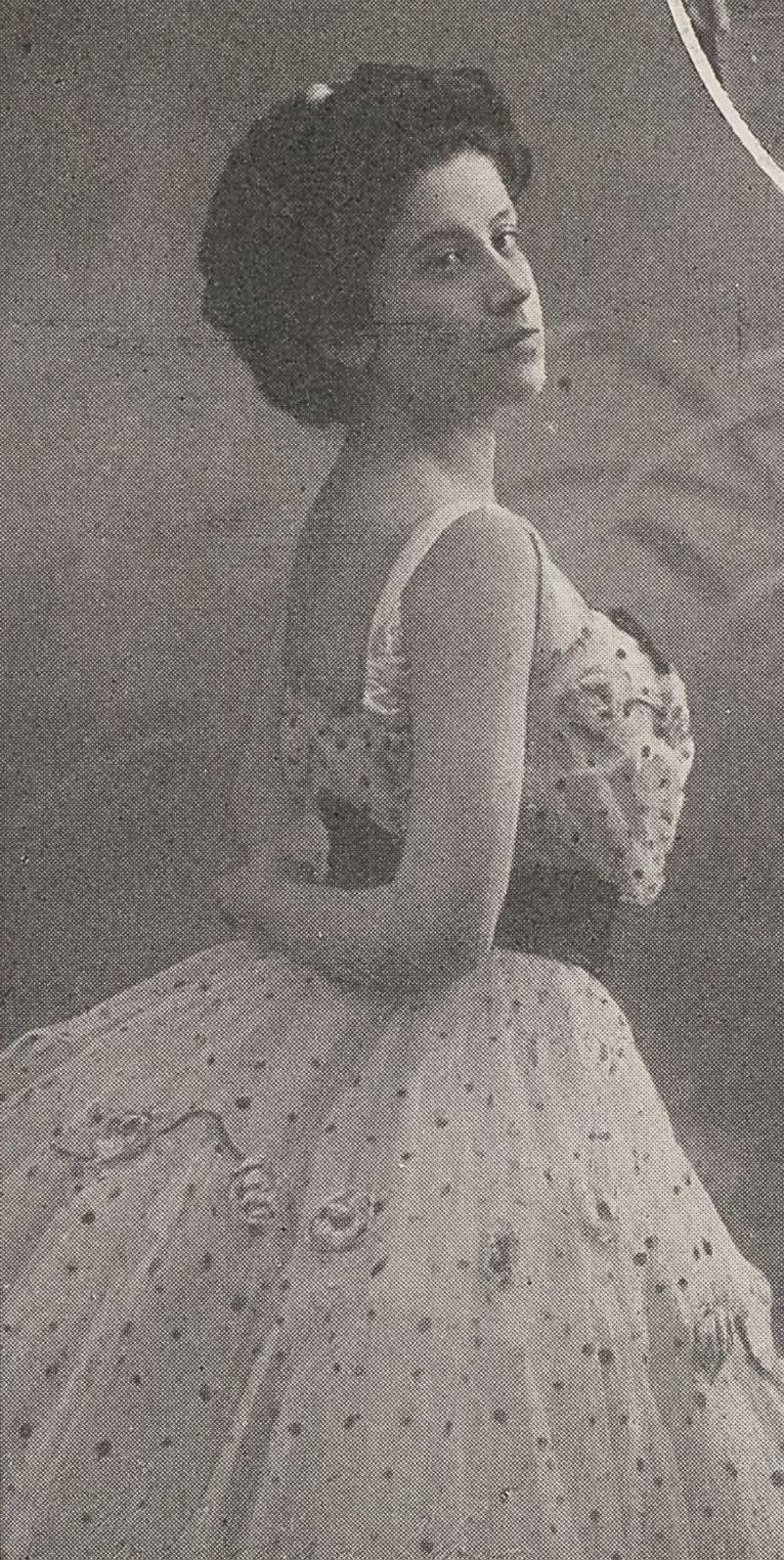
- Elena Poliakova during the Ballets Russes season at the Paris Opera, 1910
- Born: May 7, 1884; Rybinsk, Russian Empire
- Died: July 25, 1972 (aged 88); Santiago, Chile
- Occupations: Ballet dancer; choreographer; pedagogue

Elena Dmitriyevna Poliakova (Russian: Еле́на Дми́триевна Поляко́ва; 7 May 1884 – 25 July 1972) was a Russian and Yugoslav prima ballerina, choreographer, and influential ballet pedagogue.

She was a soloist at the Mariinsky Theatre and a member of Diaghilev's Ballets Russes. After emigrating, she worked in Yugoslavia, where she contributed to the establishment of professional ballet and the development of ballet education. In the later period of her life, she taught in Chile.

== Biography ==
=== Early life and education ===
She was born in Rybinsk on 7 May 1884 into the family of Dmitry Poliakov, a member of the burgher class. In 1902, she graduated from the Saint Petersburg Imperial Theatrical School, where she studied under the pedagogue Klavdia Kulichevskaya. She was a classmate and close friend of Tamara Karsavina. Poliakova began performing while still a student, making her debut on the stage of the Mikhailovsky Theatre on 29 March 1898. Toward the end of her studies, Poliakova performed in the ballet The Little Humpbacked Horse in Tsarskoye Selo before Emperor Nicholas II and Empress Alexandra.

=== Career in Russia ===
Upon completing her studies on 1 June 1902, Elena joined the troupe of the Imperial Mariinsky Theatre, where she rose from a corps de ballet dancer to a soloist. She participated in original productions by such masters as Marius Petipa, Lev Ivanov, and Alexander Gorsky. She performed on the same stage as prominent figures of Russian ballet, including Olga Preobrajenska, Mathilde Kschessinska, Nikolai Legat, Lyubov Egorova, Agrippina Vaganova, Anna Pavlova, Tamara Karsavina, and Lydia Kyasht.

In 1908–1909, Elena Poliakova participated in international tours of Adolf Bolm's troupe under the leadership of Anna Pavlova, performing in Helsinki, Stockholm, Copenhagen, Prague, and Berlin.

In 1909, she married Vladimir Nikolaevich Sadikov, secretary to the Chairman of the State Duma, and soon gave birth to a daughter, Lyudmila.

In 1910, Elena Poliakova became a leading soloist of Sergei Diaghilev's Ballets Russes in Paris, where she performed with great success in such productions as Scheherazade, Giselle, and Cléopâtre. Her mastery was highly acclaimed by the French press and recognized authorities of the ballet world, including Alexandre Benois. After returning to Saint Petersburg, she continued her career as a leading soloist at the Mariinsky Theatre.

=== Emigration and work in Europe (1918–1922) ===
Poliakova performed on the stage of the Mariinsky Theatre until the autumn of 1918. At the end of the year, she left Petrograd along with her husband, daughter, and her old nanny, also taking her student Alice Nikitina with her.

Traveling to the south of Russia, they stayed for several months in Kislovodsk, where many figures from the arts were residing at the time. There, Elena organized several performances and gave private ballet lessons. In Kislovodsk, Poliakova met the young composer Sergei Prokofiev, who was temporarily working there as a concertmaster, and met Mathilde Kschessinska for the last time. Elena and her family then traveled to Odessa, from where they took a ship to Constantinople, and onward to Yugoslavia. They arrived in Skopje by train and stayed there for some time. In Skopje, Poliakova managed to organize an improvised ballet performance together with Nikitina, but in search of permanent employment, they relocated to Ljubljana.

At the Ljubljana Opera, Poliakova was appointed prima ballerina, choreographer, and head of the ballet troupe. The Ljubljana Ballet was in its formative stages at that time. There, Poliakova staged three ballets: Les Sylphides (29 May 1920), Scheherazade (9 June 1921), and Risto Savin's Dancing Legend (11 February 1922), as well as two ballet scenes in the operas Thaïs (17 February 1921) and Lakmé (6 May 1922). In these performances, Poliakova performed the lead roles and principal solo parts. Additionally, in Ljubljana, Poliakova worked in the ballet school, which she managed herself.

=== Work in Belgrade (1922–1943) ===
==== Early work ====
On 14 February 1922, Poliakova arrived in Belgrade on tour with her students. After a successful performance at the National Theatre in Belgrade, Elena was invited to relocate from Ljubljana to Belgrade. Poliakova became the prima ballerina, director, and choreographer at the National Theatre, as well as a teacher of classical ballet at the acting and ballet school.

By the time of her arrival, the theater's ballet troupe was in the early stages of formation: it had no male dancers, and full-scale ballet performances were non-existent. Poliakova's work played a vital role in the transition of Belgrade ballet to academic standards. She was involved in forming the troupe, developing the repertoire, and training the artists.

==== Choreographic and stage activity ====
Poliakova's debut in Belgrade was the staging of choreographic scenes in the opera The Bartered Bride (1922), where she also performed the leading solo role. As early as 1923, with her participation, the first independent ballet performances in the country were realized — fragments of Tchaikovsky's The Nutcracker, as well as Michel Fokine's ballets Scheherazade and Les Sylphides. These productions, designed by artists Leonid and Rimma Brailovsky, were highly acclaimed by critics.

In the following years, the ballet troupe expanded significantly with the arrival of Alexander Fortunato, Nina Kirsanova, and Maximilian Froman, as well as other artists. A significant milestone was the staging of the ballets Coppélia (1924) and Swan Lake (1925), in which Poliakova performed alongside Kirsanova.

A key role in the development of Belgrade ballet was played by Poliakova's collaboration with Fyodor Vasilyev, a former soloist of the Mariinsky Theatre who was invited to the theater upon her recommendation. In 1927, a production of The Sleeping Beauty was staged with choreography by Marius Petipa, in which Poliakova performed the role of Aurora; among the artists she trained, Natasha Bošković and Anatol Joukowsky were particularly prominent.

A testament to Elena Poliakova's high level of professionalism was the visit of Anna Pavlova to Belgrade in March 1927. Pavlova attended a rehearsal of the Belgrade troupe and noted the high quality of the dancers' training.

==== Later career ====
After the conclusion of her regular contract in 1927, Elena Poliakova continued to perform at the National Theatre as a guest prima ballerina. In March 1928, Belgrade was visited by her classmate from the St. Petersburg Imperial Theatre School, Tamara Karsavina. The meeting of the two ballerinas, who had not seen each other for ten years since their emigration, and Karsavina's high appraisal of Poliakova's work in the theater and the school, finally solidified the latter's authority in the Yugoslav cultural environment.

On 21 May 1929, Polyikova celebrated the 25th anniversary of her artistic career by performing the role of the Tsar-Maiden in Cesare Pugni's ballet The Little Humpbacked Horse (staged by Margarita Froman). With this benefit performance, she officially concluded her stage career as a prima ballerina.

In the middle of the 1929/30 season, due to the sudden departure of Margarita Froman, Elena Poliakova temporarily headed the ballet troupe at the request of the National Theatre management (from January to July 1930). During this period, she staged choreographic scenes in the operas Samson and Delilah and Der Freischütz.

==== Teaching Career ====
In parallel with her stage work, Poliakova maintained an active teaching career. From 1922, she taught at the state acting and ballet school, and in 1923, she opened her own private studio. Following the closure of the state school in 1927, Poliakova's school became the primary center for professional ballet education in Serbia.

Poliakova trained a number of dancers who later joined the theater's troupe, including Natascha Bošković and Anatol Joukowsky. Her pedagogical system was oriented towards both primary education and the professional development of established artists.

In 1939, at the initiative of Joukowsky, Poliakova was invited to the theater to serve as chief instructor. Her work in this position was interrupted by the outbreak of World War II.

Poliakova's pedagogical activity in Belgrade continued until her departure in 1943.

=== Emigration and work in Chile (1943–1972) ===
In March 1943, due to personal circumstances, Poliakova made the decision to leave Yugoslavia. According to the memoirs of her students, her departure was linked to the position of her son-in-law (a Russian emigrant in German service), who was to be sent to the Eastern Front. On 15 March 1943, she held her last lesson and departed for Vienna the following day with her husband, daughter, and son-in-law. While still en route to Vienna, Elena's husband fell seriously ill, and she herself suffered a minor stroke, which resulted in speech impediments. In Vienna, she managed with difficulty to find work at the Volksoper.

Before Soviet troops entered Vienna, Poliakova fled toward Munich, into the zone controlled by the Western Allies. Her husband died on the train to Munich and was buried in Salzburg. Afterwards, she worked briefly in Innsbruck, staging dances for operas and operettas.

In 1949, Elena, along with her daughter and son-in-law, arrived in Chile and settled in Santiago. In Chile, Poliakova worked for a full twenty years as a teacher at the National Ballet of Chile and the Municipal Theatre (Santiago Opera). In 1965, the Ballet Archive in Santiago was named after her: Archivo Internacional de Ballet "Elena Poliakova". In recognition of this honor, the National Ballet and the Archive organized a gala performance in her tribute, and the Mayor of Santiago awarded Poliakova the Gold Medal of the City

Elena Poliakova died in Santiago on 25 July 1972, shortly after a brief hospitalization. She was buried at the Russian Cemetery in Santiago.

== Awards ==
- 1913 — Silver Medal "For Diligence" on the Ribbon of St. Vladimir (for her achievements at the Mariinsky Theatre).
- 1929 — Order of Saint Sava, 5th Class (for her contributions to the development of Belgrade ballet).
- 1965 — Gold Medal of the City of Santiago (in honor of her many years of pedagogical activity).
