= George Kovalenko =

Russian Jesuit (1900–1975)

George Kovalenko, SJ (1900 – 5 November 1975) was a Russian Jesuit, a priest of the Catholic Church and a member of the Russian apostolate.

== Biography ==
Born into an Orthodox family of a general of the Imperial Russian Army in the Russian Empire, he studied at the Kyiv Polytechnic Institute. In 1918, he became a cadet, joining the White Army, and fought in Southern Russia under the command of Generals Anatoly Lieven and Boris Permikin; he was awarded the Cross of St. George.

In exile, he was in the camps near Warsaw. In 1922 he worked in Danzig, then moved to Berlin, and studied theology and philosophy in Italy.

He lived at the Collegium Russicum and entered the Society of Jesus. In 1944 Kovalenko was ordained a priest. In Rome he organized a small publishing house, which published pamphlets and books for Russian displaced persons, visited camps for Russian refugees and displaced persons, helped the children of Saint Helena Boarding School for Russian girls in Rome, and also worked in a shelter for Russian refugees in Rome. He protested against the extradition of Russians held in the camp on Lipari by the Italian government.

Through the Catholic Church, since 1947 he led the work of the Russian Center in Rome, and engaged in the distribution of material assistance provided by the International Refugee Organization under the United Nations and the Committee for Aid to Russian refugees in Italy. Kovalenko was actively assisted by the Congregation of Marian Fathers monks George Bryanchaninov and Andrei Katkov and they joined the French Jesuit Philippe de Regis. At this time, Kovalenko met Russian writer Boris Shiryaev.

In 1951 Kovalenko went to Argentina to help Archimandrite Nikolai Alekseev, where at the church of Saints Peter and Paul he created a library. Kovalenko published articles in the Paris newspaper Russian Thought, in the Catholic Russian-language press abroad, and published under the pseudonym Ochekov in the Argentine newspaper За правду! ('For the Truth').

In 1958 due to ill health, he returned to Rome, where he underwent a serious operation. Kovalenko later worked as a librarian and taught Russian at the Collegium Russicum. He died in Rome.

== Sources ==
- Kolupaev, Vladimir (2012). Брюссельское издательство «Жизнь с Богом»: Книжный мир Русского Зарубежья XX века (in Russian) (Scientific ed.). Saarbrücken: LAP LAMBERT Academic Publishing. ISBN 978-3-8484-0980-8.
- Kolupaev, Vladimir (2011). Миссия иезуитов среди русских эмигрантов в Аргентине в XX веке // Латинская Америка [Jesuit mission of Russian emigrants in Argentina in XX century / / Latin America] (in Russian). Vol. 8. pp. 81–94.
- Kolupaev, Vladimir (2012). Русские издательские проекты в Аргентине в XX веке (in Russian). Vol. 1.
