= Camino Podolico (Ukraine) =

Saint James Way of Podillya (Spanish: Camino Podolico) is a cultural, educational and pilgrimage route from Vinnytsia to Kamianets-Podilskyi via Bar. The route was created following the model of the Way of St. James (Camino de Santiago), a network of pilgrimage routes across Europe leading to the city of Santiago de Compostela in Spain.

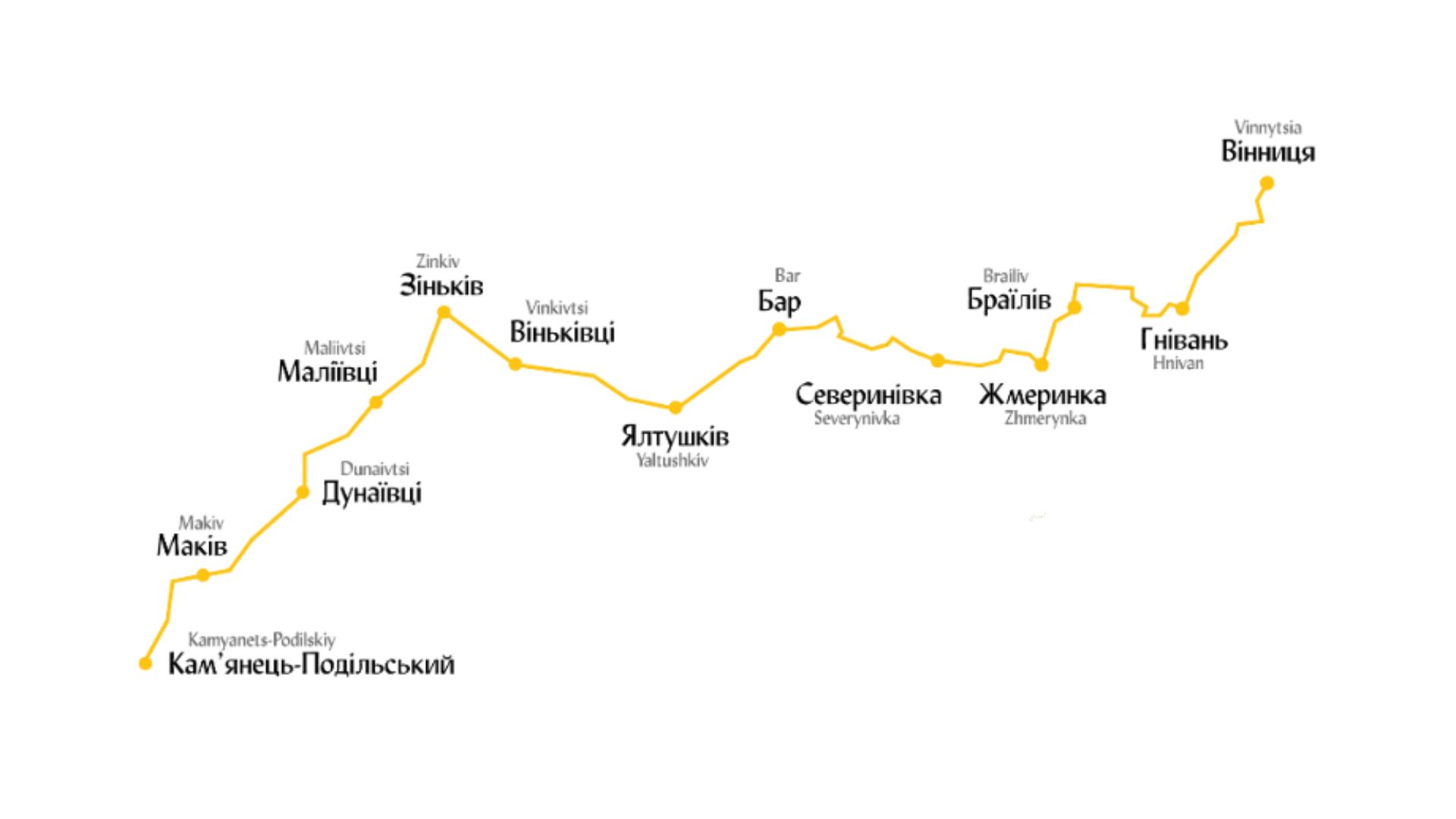
Map of the Camino Podolico route

The route currently connects 14 locations in Vinnytsia and Khmelnytskyi regions. It is more than 250 km long and can be completed in 14–16 days on foot or by bicycle. Tourist infrastructure for meals and overnight accommodation is available along the route, with an average distance of 20–30 km between stops. The route is open from April 1 to October 31.

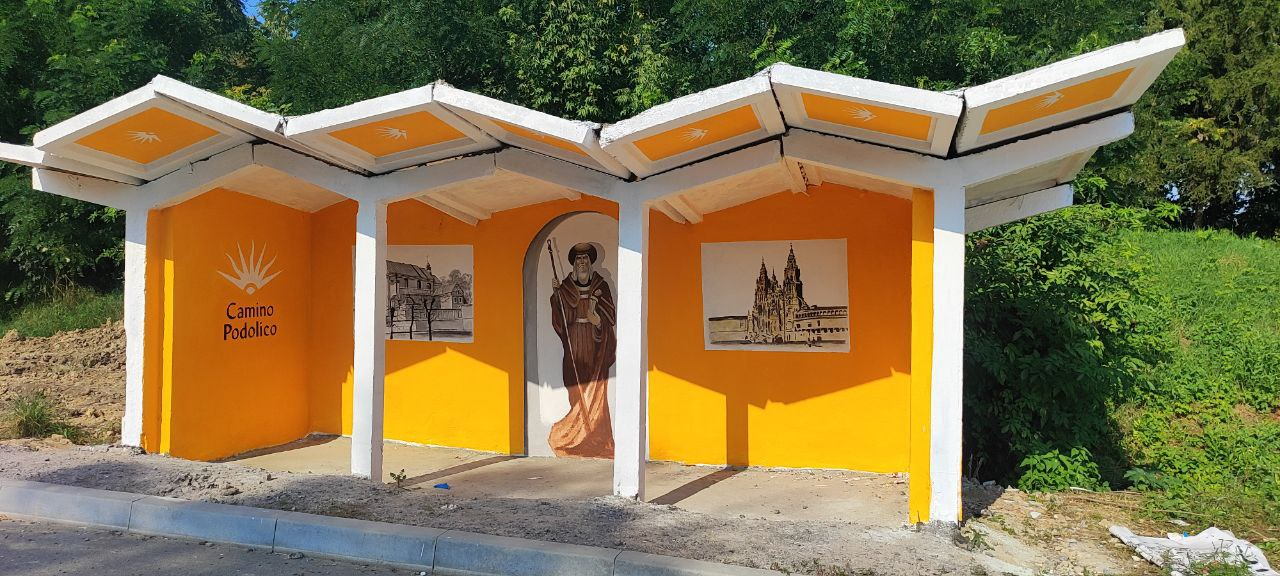
Artistically decorated bus stop along the route

Following the successful completion of the Council of Europe certification cycle in May 2024, the status of the Camino Podolico route as part of the European cultural route Camino de Santiago was confirmed. The route is coordinated by the Department of City Marketing and Tourism of the Vinnytsia City Council.

== History of the route ==
The Camino Podolico route was developed in 2021 by the Vinnytsia City Council on the initiative of Vinnytsia Mayor Serhii Morhunov, with the support of the Ukrainian Cultural Foundation. As part of the project, the official route website was created, a detailed GPS track was developed, a pilgrim passport and a certificate of completion were introduced, and the route was marked with signs, information boards, and directional arrows.

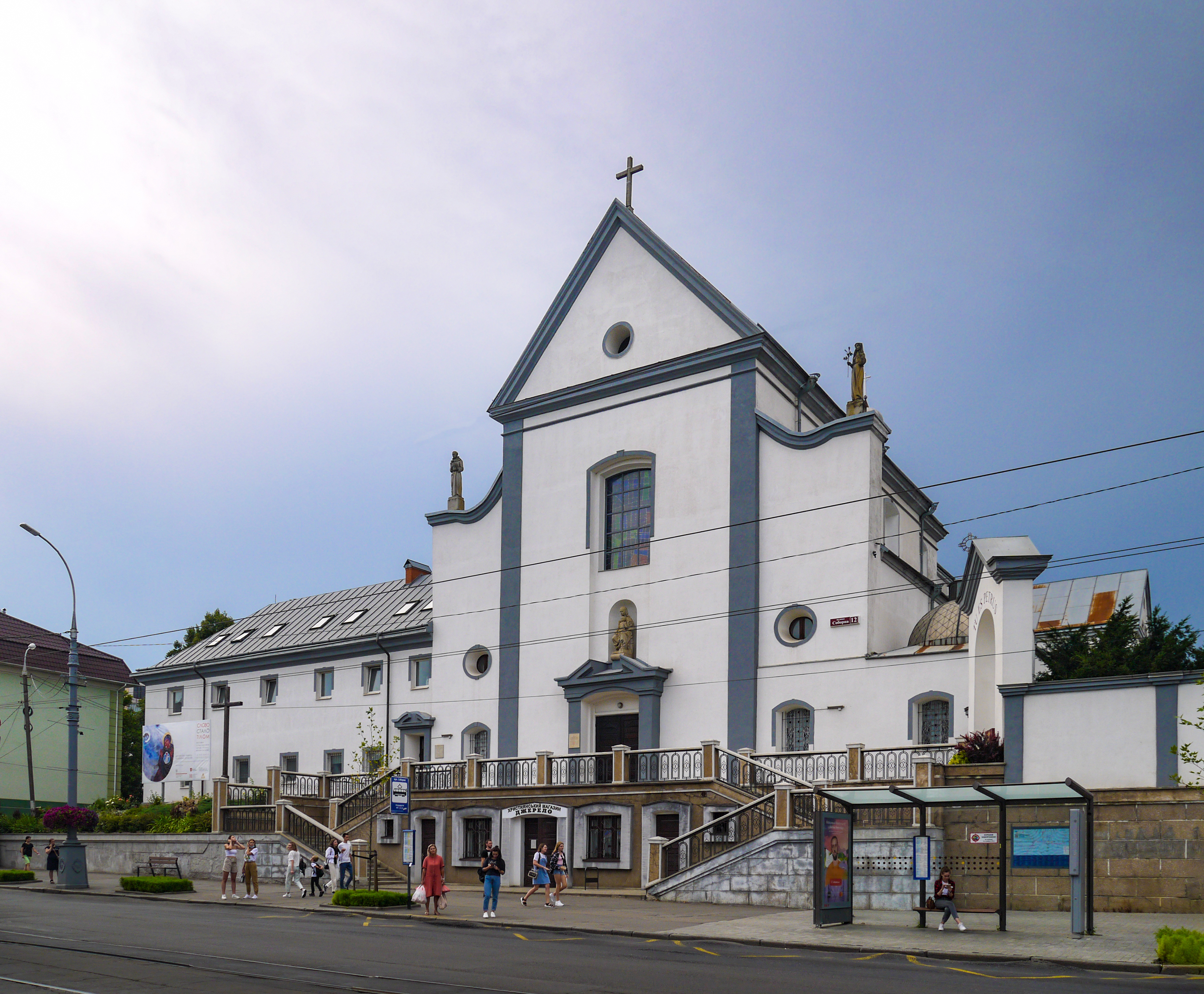
Vinnytsia — Capuchin Church of the Blessed Virgin Mary of the Angels

During the first pilot season, around 150 people completed the route. Due to the full-scale invasion of Ukraine by the Russian Federation, the route’s operation was suspended in 2022-2023 and resumed in 2024 at the request of pilgrims. In 2023, the official starting point of the Camino Podolico route was established in Vinnytsia with the installation of a sculpture of St. James near the Franciscan Church of the Blessed Virgin Mary of the Angels. This is where pilgrims beginning the route in Vinnytsia can obtain their pilgrim passport. In 2024, a bonus section was added to the route, extending from Kamianets-Podilskyi to the villages of Zavallya and Panivtsi, where the only Church of St. James in Podillya is located.

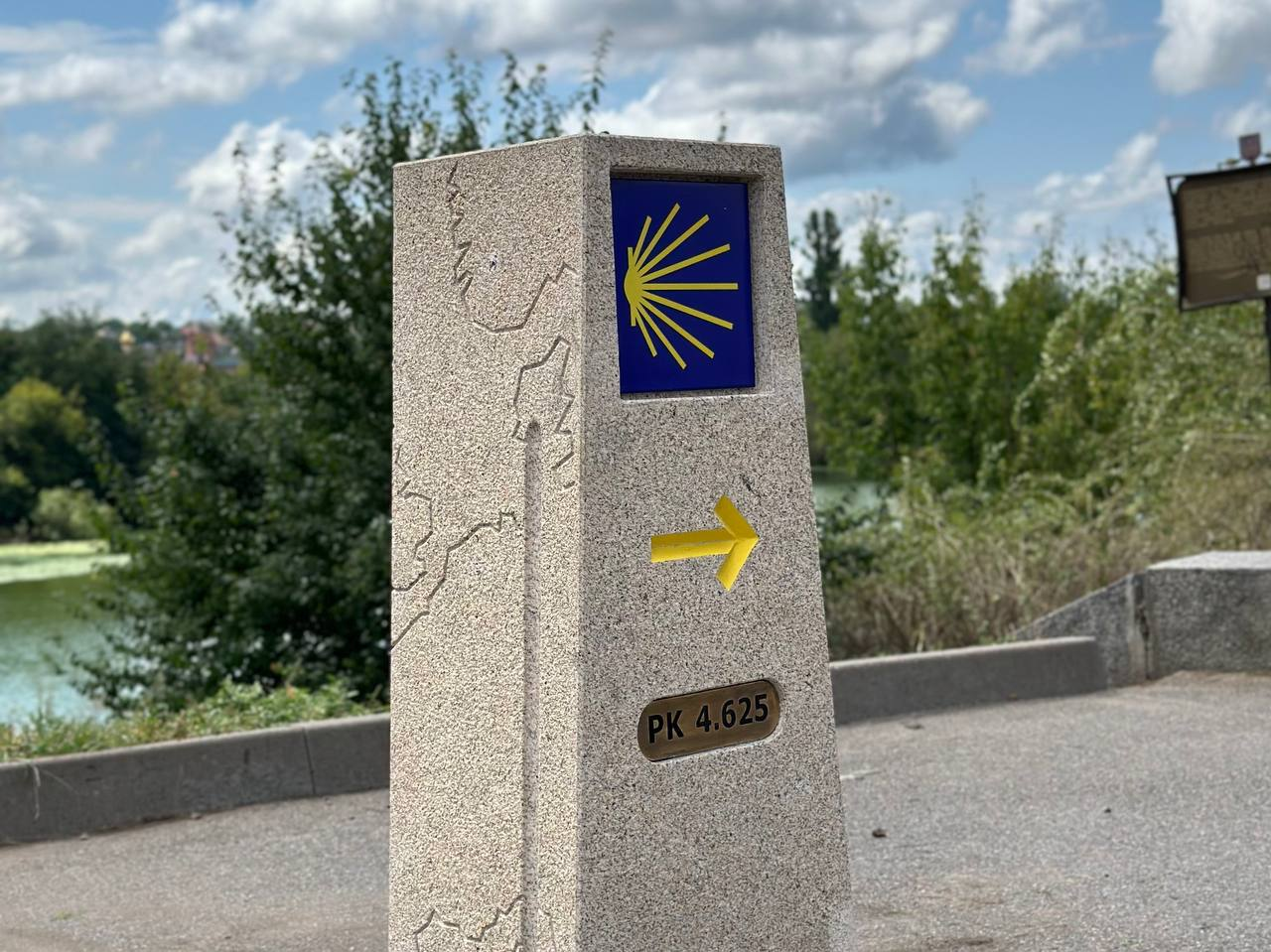
The Camino de Santiago milestone in Vinnytsia

In the same year, the Government of the Autonomous Community of Galicia, within the project Simbolos Jacobeos en el mundo presented the city of Vinnytsia with a cairn indicating the direction and distance to Santiago de Compostela — 4,625 km. In addition, ten ceramic scallop shells, the symbols of St. James Way, were installed at key sacred and secular sites along the route.

Camino Podolico is a member of the European Federation of Saint James Way — an international organization, established on May 25, 2011. St. James Way of Podillya was officially accepted into the Federation during the General Assembly on June 29, 2023 in the Spanish city of Potes.

On 4-5 July 2024, in the city of Santiago de Compostela, Andrii Ocheretnyi, Deputy Mayor of Vinnytsia, was elected Vice President of the European Federation of Saint James Way for the 2025-2028 term.

In 2024, the Association of Friends of St. James Way in Ukraine was established in Vinnytsia. Its activities focus on supporting and welcoming pilgrims, developing infrastructure, and restoring waymarking along the entire route.

== Historical Background ==
Kamianets-Podilskyi became a key stop on pilgrimage routes in Podillya as early as the 15th century. The town had inns where pilgrims could rest before continuing their journey. In addition, it served as a hub connecting Right-Bank Ukraine with Central and Western Europe. Vinnytsia, Bar, and Kamianets were important points along pilgrimage and trade routes (such as the Black Road and Kuchmatskyi Way) and were also centers of Catholic orders in the 17th-18th centuries, some of which did not extend eastward beyond these towns (including the Jesuits and Capuchins).

The 16th century was the era of so-called “hodin” (walkings) and “putnyky” (pilgrims), who followed the oral tradition of storytelling. For example, the Podillian Meletii Smotrytskyi composed the polemical text Apologia peregrinatiey do kraiów wschodnich (1628), which reflected his personal pilgrim experience. Smotrytskyi turned to the Apostle James: «Vir enim duplex animo inconstans est in omnibus viis suis» – «A double-minded person is unstable in all his ways» (James 1:8). From the 17th to the 19th centuries, pilgrimage culture developed through local shrines, religious rituals, and the emergence of a “pilgrimage industry”.

In the 19th century, when Podillya was annexed by the Russian Empire, the route Vinnytsia – Brailiv – Bar – Kamianets-Podilskyi regained its significance as a pilgrimage path. During the era of militant atheism in the USSR, pilgrimage declined due to religious persecution. However, the memory of these traditions persisted and was even enriched by new miracles, such as the “Kalynivka Miracle” in 1923. The newly established Camino Podolico inherits this long-standing tradition of Christian pilgrimage.

== Route ==
№	Start	Finish	Distance	Passes through
1	Vinnytsia	Hnivan	25,8 km	Prybuzke, Selyshche
2	Hnivan	Brailiv	18,04 km	Demydivka
3	Brailiv	Zhmerynka	11,93 km	Leliaky
4	Zhmerynka	Severynivka	25,7 km	Mezhyriv, Serbynivtsi
5	Severynivka	Bar	25,56 km	Melnyky
6	Bar	Yaltushkiv	23,5 km	Zhuravlivka
7	Yaltushkiv	Vinkivtsi	30 km	Dashkivtsi
8	Vinkivtsi	Zinkiv	16,4 km	Stanislavivka
9	Zinkiv	Maliivtsi	22,1 km	Pokutyntsi, Proskurivka
10	Maliivtsi	Dunaivtsi	19 km	Pidlisnyi Mukariv
11	Dunaivtsi	Makiv	24,3 km	Slobidka-Rakhnivska, Mykhailivka
12	Makiv	Kamianets-Podilskyi	22,29 km	Shatava, Humentsi
13	Kamianets-Podilskyi	Zavallya	23,7 km	Surzha, Rykhta

== Statistics ==
In the pilot year of 2021, around 150 people completed the route either fully or partially; of these, approximately 35 pilgrims received a certificate of completion in Kamianets-Podilskyi.

After a two-year pause, the route was resumed in 2024. During the 2024 season, 338 pilgrims completed the Camino Podolico route, including 242 women and 96 men. Most participants (258) walked the route, while 80 traveled by bicycle.

In the 2025 season, interest in the route continued to grow. A total of 568 certificates of completion were issued, 267 more than in 2024. Overall, 371 women and 197 men completed the route in 2025. Additionally, four foreign pilgrims — citizens of Canada, Germany, Poland, and the Czech Republic — completed the route that year.

== Associated Projects ==
In 2024, the Department of City Marketing and Tourism of Vinnytsia City Council, funded by grants from the European Union, the Council of Europe, and the European Commission, implemented the project "The Way Must Go On." As part of the project, the region's gastronomic heritage was researched, and a gastro-catalogue and video features about local Podillya dishes were released.

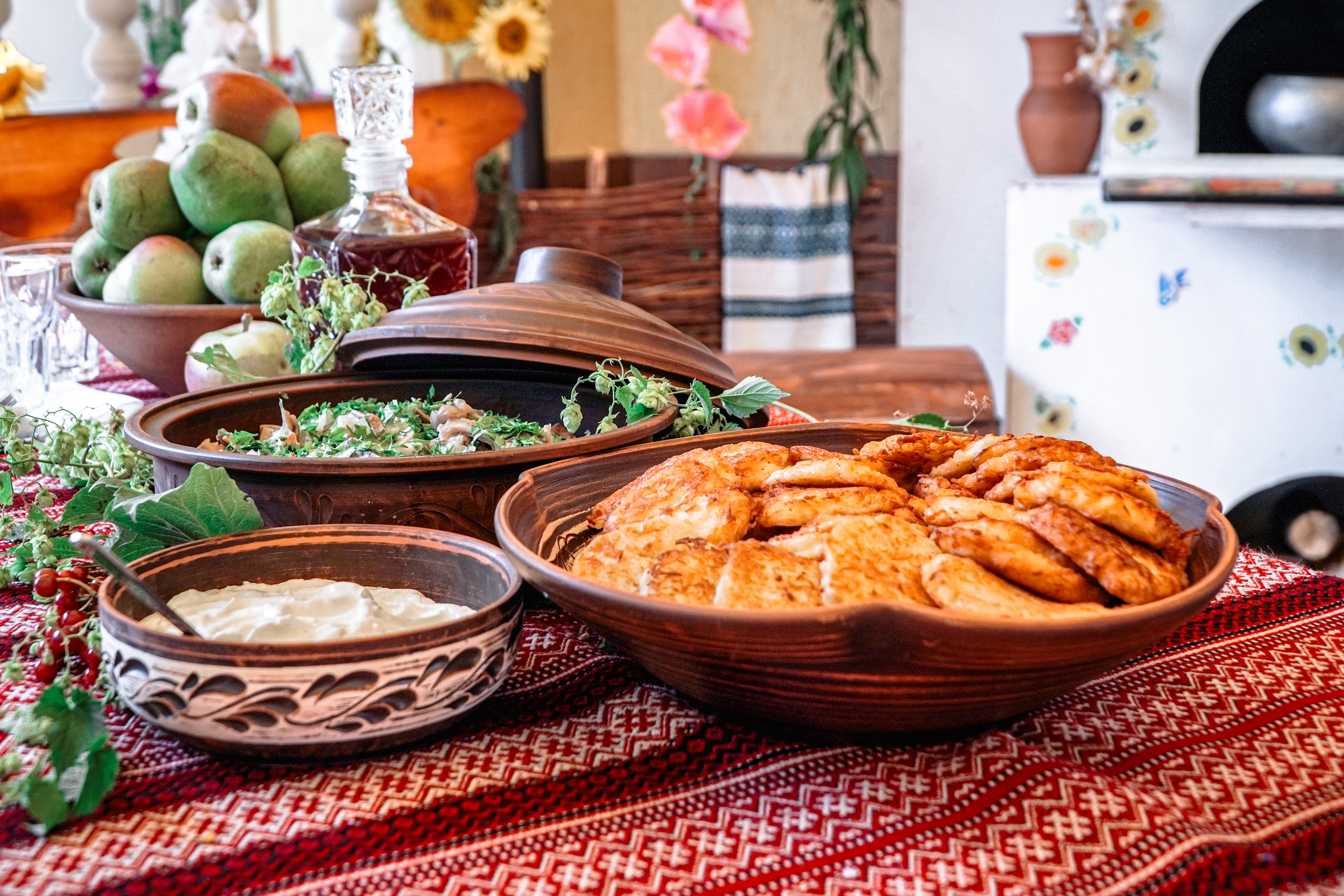
Voroshylivka tripe and potato pancakes (Hnivan)

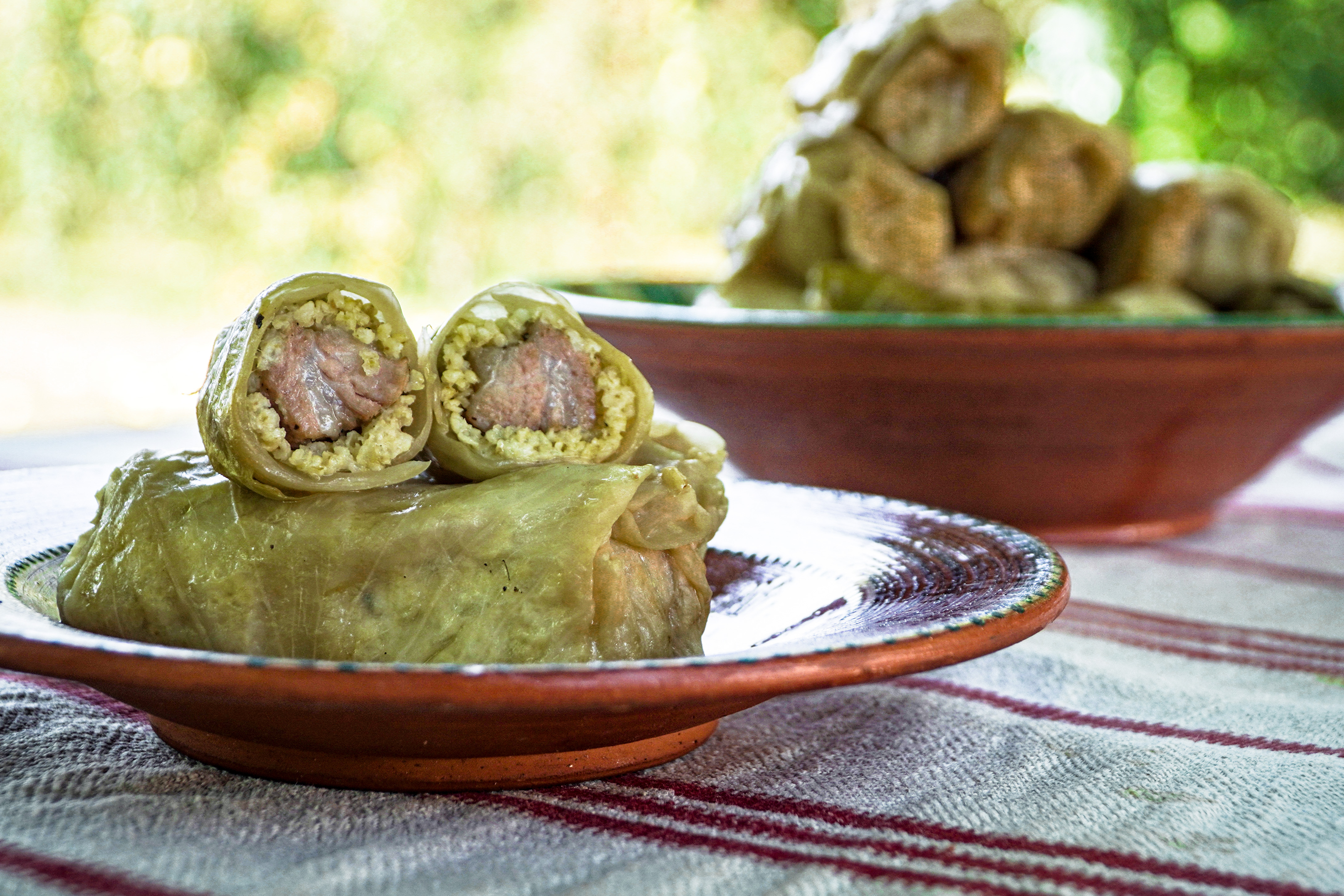
Cabbage rolls from the era of Queen Bona (Bar)

The gastronomic catalogue includes 22 recipes for authentic Podillian dishes in both Ukrainian and English. The catalogue contains a list of locations along the route where travelers can taste these dishes. Featured dishes include cherry borscht and stuffed chicken necks (Vinnytsia), tripe made from young calf stomach (Voroshylivka near Hnivan), stew with pickled cucumbers (Brailiv), cherry varenyky in kissel and stuffed pike (Zhmerynka), cabbage rolls on pork ribs from the era of Queen Bona and milk kissel (Bar), white borscht (Maliivtsi), and other traditional Podillian cuisine.

The Saint James Way of Podillya is also used as a tool for psychological and emotional recovery for Ukrainian service members during rehabilitation, veterans of the Russo-Ukrainian War, and their family members. For instance, in 2024–2025, a two-day art-therapeutic hike was organized for the wives of service members, featuring a masterclass and the painting of a public transport stop, as well as a rafting trip on the Riv River and a hike along part of the route for veterans.
