= Rimma Brailovskaya =

Russian painter (1877–1959)

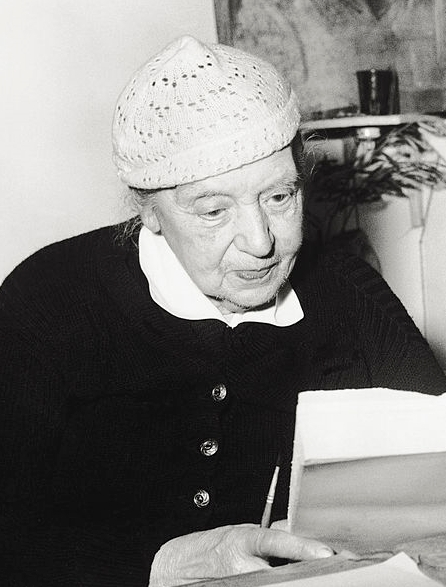
Brailovskaya in Rome in the 1950s

Rimma Nikitichna Brailovskaya (14 April 1877, Tartu, Russian Empire – 28 September 1959, Rome, Italy) was a Russian painter. She worked in the genres of landscapes and genre paintings using in watercolor and tempera. She also worked created embroidery and applique. She was a participant of the Russian apostolate in Diaspora.

== Biography ==
Brailovskaya was daughter of a general. In 1898 she married the artist Leonid Brailovsky, who lived in Moscow. Known as an independent artist, she participated together with her husband in the implementation of joint projects. In 1900 she taught art at Stroganov Moscow State University of Arts and Industry. In 1918 the Brailovsky family emigrated, first to Constantinople and then to Belgrade; from 1925 they were settled in Rome.

== Conversion to Catholicism ==
Brailovskaya and her husband were Russian Orthodox and later joined the Catholic Church. The couple were close to the bishops Michel d'Herbigny, Alexander Evreinov, and Andrei Katkov. In 1933 she participated in the creation of the Museum of Russian religious art at the Congregation for the Oriental Churches in the Vatican, where they exposed Brailovsky's paintings from the series "Visions of Old Russia." From 1920 to 1940, her paintings were exhibited in Russicum, where she taught Russian language, this time talking with the poet Vyacheslav Ivanov, Archpriest Alexander Sipiagin and Tatyana Sukhotina-Tolstaya.

== Death ==
Brailovskaya was buried in the Russian part of the Roman Catholic cemetery of Campo Verano.

== Bibliography ==
- Vladimir Kolupaev "Publications of Russian diaspora about the work of the architect L. Brailovsky in Rome". Proceedings of the conference on the 250th anniversary of the Research Museum of the Russian Academy of Arts, 24–25 November 2008 St. Petersburg.: Arts, 2008.
- Vladimir Kolupaev "Russian artists Leonid and Rimma Brailovsky in Russia and Rome" in Russian in Italy. Italntsy in Russia: the interaction of cultures. St. Petersburg, 2012. pp. 50–78. ISBN 978-5-9227-0364-2

Rigotti, G. (a cura di) "Leonid e Rimma Brailovskij. Visioni della vecchia Russia | Леонид и Римма Браиловскиe. Видения Cтарой Руси", Congregazione per le Chiese Orientali, Musei Vaticani, Valore Italiano Editore. Città del Vaticano, 2021. ISBN 978-88-97789-92-5. (www.valoreitalianobookstore.com)
