= Nikolai Alekseev =

Nikolai Alekseev may refer to:

- Nikolai Alekseev (Catholic priest) (1869–1952), Russian Greek-Catholic priest
- Nikolay Alexeyev (born 1977), Russian gay-rights activist
- Nikolay Alekseyev (mayor of Moscow) (1852–1893), Russian entrepreneur, philanthropist, and public figure
- Nikolai Alekseev (conductor) (born 1956), Russian conductor
