= Anatol Joukowsky =

Russian ballet dancer

- Анатолий Михайлович Жуковский
- Born: 18 August 1905 or 5 August 1906; Siedlce, Russian Empire
- Died: 5 October 1998 (aged 92 or 93); Menlo Park, California, United States
- Occupations: ballet dancer, choreographer, teacher
- Spouse: Yana Wassiliewa

Anatol Joukowsky (Russian: Анато́лий Миха́йлович Жуко́вский; 18 August 1905 or 5 August 1906, Siedlce, Russian Empire — 5 October 1998, Menlo Park, California, United States) was a ballet dancer, choreographer, teacher, and chief ballet master of the National Theatre in Belgrade.

== Biography ==
=== Early years and emigration ===
He was born in the city of Siedlce (now in Poland) into the family of an officer, Mikhail Joukowsky. With the outbreak of World War I, the family moved to Petrograd and later to their family estate Surmachevka in Poltava Governorate.

In 1917, Joukowsky entered the St. Vladimir Kiev Cadet Corps. During the Russian Civil War, he and his father took part in the retreat of the Volunteer Army from Novorossiysk to Crimea. He continued his education at the newly formed Crimean Cadet Corps, followed by another evacuation.

In 1920, Joukowsky left Russia with his father. After evacuation via Constantinople, he ended up in Thessaloniki, where he joined the Scout movement, which became his lifelong commitment. A year later, his father sent him to the Kingdom of Serbs, Croats and Slovenes (later Yugoslavia) to continue his education at the relocated Crimean Cadet Corps. Joukowsky graduated in 1922 and enrolled at the University of Belgrade, Faculty of Engineering.

=== Work at the National Theatre in Belgrade ===
Seeking a livelihood, Anatoly found employment as an extra in the opera and drama departments of the National Theatre in Belgrade. He also appeared as a background performer in the theater's newly formed ballet department. In 1924, the ballet director Alexander Fortunato, also a Russian émigré, staged the first full-length ballets in Belgrade — Coppélia and Swan Lake. He noticed Joukowsky and recommended that he train at the ballet studio of Elena Poliakova. Thus, at the premiere of Léo Delibes's ballet Coppélia on 11 June 1924, the young extra Anatoly Joukowsky made his debut.

Joukowsky left the university and enrolled in Poliakova's school and the state theatre school. His talent was recognized not only by Poliakova but also by Anna Pavlova, who visited Belgrade in 1927. Gradually, Joukowsky performed the entire ballet repertoire, replacing dancers who were on tour, and in 1932 he became the first soloist of the ballet.

In 1932, Joukowsky married the ballerina Yana Wassiliewa.

From the mid-1930s, he served as acting ballet master, and from 1938 as the official ballet master of the National Theatre. Between 1935 and 1941, he staged 11 ballets in operas and 10 choreographies in the ballet repertoire, including Polovtsian Dances, Francesca da Rimini, The Golden Cockerel, and others.

=== Yugoslav national ballet and folklore ===
Joukowsky made a significant contribution to the development of Yugoslav national ballet, combining performance with the study of folk traditions. As a leading soloist, he participated in major productions of the time, such as The Gingerbread Heart and Imbrek with a Nose by Krešimir Baranović, and The Devil in the Village by Fran Lhotka.

While preparing the ballet The Legend of Ohrid by Stevan Hristić in 1933, Joukowsky worked not only as a dancer but also as a researcher: together with choreographer Nina Kirsanova, he studied authentic Macedonian dance steps from folk performers, adapting them for the stage.

In addition to his theatre work, he formed his own folklore troupe focused on ethnographic accuracy of movement. In June 1938, this group represented Yugoslavia at the Festival of Slavic Dances in Prague, where it won first place. For this achievement, Joukowsky was awarded the Czechoslovak Order of St. Wenceslas.

Joukowsky actively conducted field research on Balkan folklore, traveling across Yugoslavia, Bulgaria, and Greece, documenting folk dance steps for use in professional choreography.

His choreographic debut in national ballet took place on 15 February 1941 with the production Fire in the Mountains by composer Alfred Pordes. The action was set on the slopes of the Šar Mountains and in villages of southern Serbia. Around the same time, he staged Symphonic Kolo to the music of Jakov Gotovac. His last work in Belgrade was the ballet In the Valley of the Morava by Svetomir Nastasijević, premiered on 3 January 1942.

=== World War II and emigration ===
At the beginning of World War II in 1941, Joukowsky volunteered for the army; he saw combat but was taken prisoner. He managed to escape on the third day and returned to Belgrade. In 1943, he and his wife moved to Vienna, where they had many acquaintances. However, as the theaters in Vienna soon closed, the couple continued their journey westward. Joukowsky joined the French army and participated in the liberation of Stuttgart and other cities. After the war, he remained in the French army until 1948 as the artistic director of a troupe in which his wife also performed.

From 1948, the Joukowskys performed with the Russian Ballet of Colonel Wassily de Basil. They performed in Paris and toured until the end of 1949, after which the troupe was disbanded and they decided to move to the United States.

=== Life in the United States ===
In 1951, Anatoly Joukowsky and Yana Wassiliewa settled in San Francisco. Initially, Joukowsky worked as a mechanic at a factory but soon became actively involved in developing the folk dance community. He collaborated with the Folk Dance Federation of California and taught character dance at the San Francisco Ballet. Yana Wassiliewa opened her own ballet school.

Together with his wife, Joukowsky organized the project The Joukowsky Recital. Initially a duet performance, it later became part of the Kolo Week festival program in San Francisco. His work gained recognition: in November 1957, his portrait in a stylized folk costume appeared on the cover of Let's Dance, the official publication of the Folk Dance Federation of California.

From 1953, Joukowsky taught at the Dance Department of San Francisco State University for 25 years, until his retirement in 1978. In 1979, he was inducted into the university's Hall of Fame.

At Stanford University, he conducted special classes in Russian folk dance, led demonstration groups, and taught at annual folk dance camps at the University of the Pacific in Stockton and in Santa Barbara.

In 1965, Joukowsky published the book The Teaching of Ethnic Dance, which is still used by dance teachers and choreographers.

In addition to his professional work, Joukowsky continued his scouting activities in the United States. Upon arrival, he joined the Organization of Russian Young Pathfinders (ORYuR), becoming head of its Western American division. For 22 years, he was a member of its Council and for 33 years a member of its Supreme Court of Honor; he also edited the bulletin Vestnik rukovoditelya until 1980 and contributed to the unification of ORYuR with NORS (National Organization of Russian Scouts). In the early 1990s, he traveled to Russia, helping to revive the scouting movement in Anapa and the Kuban region.

Joukowsky died on 5 October 1998 in Menlo Park, California. He was buried at the Serbian Cemetery near San Francisco.
