= George Bryanchaninov =

Russian Greek-Catholic priest (1919–2018)

George Bryanchaninov M.I.C. (8 June 1919 – 5 April 2018), also spelled was a Russian priest in the Russian Greek Catholic Church, an Archimandrite and a member of the Russian apostolate in the Diaspora.

== Biography ==
George Bryanchaninov (Brianchaninov) was born on 18 June 1919 in Blagoveshchensk, Russian State. In his Orthodox baptism he was named Gleb. Together with his parents he emigrated to China, where in 1937 he graduated with honors at High School of Saint Nicholas in Harbin. Soon after, he joined the Catholic Church and on 4 December 1938 entered the Marian Order, taking the monastic name George. From May 1939 he received religious education in Rome, hosted a program on Vatican Radio. In 1944 he was ordained a priest of the Russian Catholic Church by Bishop Alexander Evreinov. He obtained a doctoral degree (1947, thesis "Studies of Saint John Chrysostom Church of obedience to authority"). On behalf of General Order Marian Bishop Peter Buchis he was engaged by Russian children in refugee camps in Western Europe. Until 1950 he worked in the Russian Committee for Refugees in the Vatican, then in 1956 he went to London.

In 1957 he moved to Australia to help Andrei Katkov, his classmate at the Lyceum, and brother in the Order. With him, he co-founded the Missionary Centre for Eastern-rite Catholics in Melbourne, nourished Catholics after moving to Australia from China, as Russian immigrants, including once in 1958, when Fr. Andrew (rink) was recalled to Rome. Father Bryanchaninov received Australian citizenship. In the beginning of 1990 he travelled several times to Russia. With the support of the Archbishop of Melbourne he purchased a large house in Stevenson St, Kew where he eloquently decorated the front room with ikons and eastern rite traditional design. This house served as the Centre for Eastern Rite Russian Catholics until the end of 2007, when his mobility declined and he moved to the Saint Joseph Nursing Home for Priests in Northcote (suburb of Melbourne). Archimandrite George (Bryanchaninov) was nephew of the bishop and theologian Ignatius Bryanchaninov. He died in Melbourne, Victoria, Australia on 5 April 2018 at the age of 98 and was buried at Fawkner Memorial Park together with his mother who was interred in 1971.
