= Alexander Evreinov =

Russian diplomat and Catholic archbishop (1877–1959)

- Archbishop
- Native name: Александр Николаевич Евреинов
- Church: Russian Greek Catholic

Orders
- Consecration: 6 December 1936

Personal details
- Born: Alexander Nikolaevich Evreinov; 8 March 1877 Saint Petersburg, Russian Empire
- Died: 20 August 1959 (aged 82) Rome, Italy
- Buried: Grottaferrata, Rome
- Denomination: Russian Catholic

Alexander Nikolaevich Evreinov (8 March 1877 – 20 August 1959) was a Russian bishop, who converted to Russian Greek Catholic Church from Russian Orthodoxy. Being a citizen with a noble origin in Saint Petersburg, Evreinov was a member of the Foreign Affairs department of the Russian nation before his conversion to the Catholic faith and ordination to the priesthood. Despite being consecrated as a bishop in 1936, Evreinov did not have any jurisdiction among Russian Catholics, either in the Soviet Union or in the Russian diaspora. Evreinov was a member of the Russian Apostolate.

== Biography ==
He was born into the Russian nobility in Saint Petersburg. His father, Nicholas Evreinov was a social and political activist, and was also a landowner. Alexander Evreinov worked as a diplomat for the Russian Foreign Office, and was secretary of the Russian embassy in Constantinople from 1900 to 1906, and then in Rome from 1906 to 1909.

== Conversion to Catholicism ==
In 1905, he converted to Catholicism in Constantinople. In 1909, he retired and went to study at the seminary in 1913 in the Greek Collegium of Saint Athanasius in Rome. Evreinov ordained a priest in 1916, and in 1921 he began to work in the Apostolic Nunciature in Paris.

== Pastor in Paris and the Russian emigration ==
In 1925, Father Alexander Evreinov served firstly in Paris the Catholic liturgy according to the Russian liturgical tradition, in the crypt of the Church of Mary Magdalene, which marked the beginning of a Russian Catholic parish dedicated to the Holy Trinity.

Following her own conversion, Hélène Iswolsky regularly attended the Divine Liturgy at the Church of the Holy Trinity, which was located near the Porte d'Italie in Paris. She later praised Mgr. Alexander Evreinov, in her memoirs. Mgr. Alexander, Iswolsky wrote, offered the Byzantine Rite without the Latin Rite borrowings commonly added in Galicia and, "one might have thought oneself at an Orthodox service, except that prayers were offered for the Pope and our hierarchical head, the Archbishop of Paris." Iswolsky added that the chapel, although humble, "was decorated in the best of taste and according to the strictest Russian religious style; the iconostasis was the work of a Russian painter well-versed in ancient Eastern iconography. The central panel was a faithful copy of Rubleff's Trinity."

In this same community, consisting of representatives of the Russian emigration were also associated priests Fr. Vladimir Abrikosov and former Old Bolshevik Fr. Dmitriy Kuz'min-Karavaev. Among the congregation were famous people: the writer Nadezhda Lappo-Danilevsky, Baron Mikhail Taube, director D. Aristov, Colonel Michael A. Yudin-Belsky, Zoya Kamlyuhina and others.

In 1927, the parish acquired its own premises. Consecrator of the church was Bishop Pranciškus Petras Būčys, MIC. In 1928 Evreinov was elevated to the rank of Archimandrite. In 1930 Evreinov founded and begins to edit the journal "Blagovest". In 1932, at the initiative of the parish there Evreinov founded the Brotherhood of Saint Nicholas the Wonderworker, in Paris, which every third Sunday of the month suit reading the reports, and to do special prayers and Fellowship of Prayer for the Church communion, which continued the tradition of Moscow's joint Orthodox-Catholic spiritual meetings on the subject of church unity, pledged thanks to the initiative of the Patriarch of All Russia Tikhon Belavin and Exarch of Russian Catholics of Byzantine Rite Archpriest Leonid Feodorov. The participants of these ecumenical meetings in Paris commissioned a special icon of Saint Sergius and Saint Teresa of the Child Jesus, chosen patrons of these conversations. On 17 March 1933, in a Saint-Sulpice church in Paris, Archimandrite Evreinov concelebrated with a priest professor at the Catholic Institute of Paris George Tsebrikovym, assisted in the service of the liturgy by Bishop Nicholas Charnetsky of the Ukrainian Greek Catholic Church.

In 1934, the parish church in Paris was equipped with a new building at 39 Rue François-Gérard, where it is to this day. After Evreinov, the rector of the church was a Frenchman, Dominican Christopher Dumont.

== Bishop ==
On 6 December 1936 Evreinov became a bishop with the title Pariiskii and he would continue to work in responsible positions in the Vatican. On the occasion of celebrations in 1938 of the 950th anniversary of the Baptism of Russia for the first time in Saint Peter's Basilica on 21 May Evreinov serve the liturgy together with the clergy of the Ukrainian Greek Catholic Church, Father Josyf Slipyj, rector of the Theological Academy in Lviv and abbot Studite Clement Sheptytsky, the future Second Russian Exarch of the Catholics of the Byzantine rite. There were other Catholic priests present, as Cyril King and Victor Novikov, the future Russian Deputy Exarch, then Catholic Exarch of Siberia and the secret bishop. Evreinov ordained many in the Russian apostolate, such as: Andrei Katkov, Cyril Kozina, Henri Petitjean, Andrew Sterpin, Theodore Romzha and others.

During World War II, Evreinov headed the Pontifical Committee for Aid to Prisoners of War, then from 1947 to 1959, he led the department of the foreign press at the State Secretariat of the Vatican. In Rome, Evreinov also continued his Catholic evangelism within the Russian diaspora, as the first and second wave, during which he helped the writer Boris Nikolaevich Shiryaev, poet Vyacheslav Ivanov, Leonid Brailovsky, and his wife Rimma.

On 5 June 1952 the archbishop consecrated a new altar, donated by Slovak Catholics of the United States of America and Canada, in the Roman Basilica of Saint Clement. Archbishop Evreinov lived in Rome at the Pontifical Russian Collegium Russicum. Evreinov died on 20 August 1959 in Rome and lies buried in the Greek Byzantine Catholic Church's monastery founded by St. Nilus of Rossano in Grottaferrata.

== Bibliography ==
- Vladimir Kolupaev. Mental and socio-cultural picture of the life of Russian Catholics in Paris in the XX century / / Yearbook of historical and anthropological research. Moscow: Publishing House "Economy-Inform", 2010. pp. 64 – 73.
- Vladimir Kolupaev. Writer Boris Shiryaev / / Library, No. 12 (174), 2012.
