= Raquel Brailowsky =

Puerto Rican anthropologist

Raquel Brailowsky-Cabrera (October 22, 1953 – June 15, 2019) was a Paraguayan-born Puerto Rican social anthropologist and professor of anthropology and sociology at the Interamerican University of Puerto Rico, San Germán Campus.

== Biography ==
Born in Asunción, Paraguay, she came to Puerto Rico at an early age. She obtained her bachelor's degree from the University of Puerto Rico at Rio Piedras. In 1977, she obtained her master's degree in history from the State University of New York at Stony Brook, and in 1993 she obtained her Ph.D. in philosophy and letters from the same institution.

She published extensively on topics like popular culture and folklore. Her research focused on the mask festivities of the northern area of Puerto Rico. Her thesis, A Study of Popular Culture: Masked Festivities in San Sebastian, Puerto Rico, studies Puerto Rican popular culture. She was also the author of the Anthropology chapter in Lina Torres's textbook Introduction to Social Sciences. Other research includes women, medicinal plants, and the Caribbean. She served in various cultural organizations and programs, such as the Institute of Puerto Rican Culture's Cultural Promotion Program—of which she was the coordinator from 1978 to 1981—and the Caribbean Studies Association—of which she was the secretary-treasurer for five years. Her other involvements included the Puerto Rican Association of Historians, the Santo Domingo de Porta Coeli Board of Trustees, the Francisco Mariano Quiñones Cultural Center, and the Latin American Studies Association.

Barilowsky-Cabrera was a professor of anthropology and sociology at the Interamerican University of Puerto Rico, where she taught from 1981 until her retirement in 2017. During that time, she "taught more than twenty courses on various historical, anthropological, and sociological topics", and held multiple leadership roles in the institution's administration. The university granted her an emritus professorship in June 2018.

On June 15, 2019, Brailowsky-Cabrera passed away due to breast cancer.

== Education ==
- B.A. in humanities, magna cum laude, from the University of Puerto Rico at Rio Piedras.
- M.A. in History and Ph.D. in Social Anthropology from the State University of New York at Stony Brook.
