= Risto Savin =

Slovenian composer

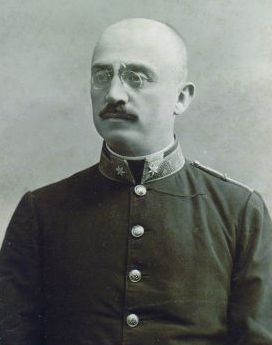
Risto Savin

Risto Savin (Žalec, July 11, 1859 – Zagreb, December 15, 1948), born Fridrich Širca, was a Slovenian composer. He is one of the composers credited with creating a Slovenian national tradition of opera.

Risto Savin was a pseudonym adopted by Fridrich Širca, a general in the army. He studied composition with Robert Fuchs in Vienna and became notable as one of the composers of Slovenian-language opera. His opera Lepa Vida (Lovely Vida, 1907) is one of the Slovenian operas to show the influence of Wagner. The house where Risto Savin was born in Žalec is now a museum.

== Works ==
Operas

- Poslednja straža (Last Watch, 1898)
- Lepa Vida (Pretty Vida, 1907)
- Gosposvetski sen (1921)
- Matija Gubec (1923)

Ballets

- Plesna legendica (1918)
- Čajna punčka (The Tea Girl, 1922)

Songs

- "Pismo" (The Letter, Oton Župančič)
- "To je tako" (Oton Župančič)
- "Svetla noč" (Oton Župančič)
- "Marica" (Oton Župančič)
- "Ljubica, zdaj je dan" (Anton Aškerc)

== Selected recordings ==
- Music for cello and piano Grieg, Savin, Martinu, Pucihar Nikolaj Sajko and pianist Miha Haas.
