= Nikolai Alekseev (Catholic priest) =

Russian Greek Catholic priest (1869–1952)

Archimandrite Nikolai Alekseev (January 21, 1869 – April 23, 1952) was a Russian Greek-Catholic priest.

== Biography ==
Alekseev was born on January 21, 1869, in Vyborg, Finland, into the family of a colonel. He studied at the gymnasium and the Swedish lyceum in Helsinki. In 1897 he was tonsured a monk and ordained a deacon in the Trinity-Sergius Hermitage, Saint Petersburg. In 1899 he was sent as a representative of the Russian Orthodox mission in Seoul and was ordained to the priesthood in 1901.

From 1904 to 1906 he was forced to take a break from his work at the mission because of the outbreak of Russian-Japanese War. Alekseev, along with other Russian clergy, left Seoul. They found a temporary refuge in neighboring China. The missionaries moved to Shanghai, where the Beijing branch of the Orthodox mission was located. Some time later, Alekseev was invited to continue his ministry in Petropavlovsk-Kamchatsky, being ordained an abbot. During the Civil War deputized Bishop Nestor of Kamchatka went to China. Alekseev moved to Vladivostok, from where he later moved to Harbin, China. In 1925 the synod of bishops of the Russian Orthodox Church Outside of Russia (ROCOR) elevated him to the rank of archimandrite and transferred him to Beijing.

There, Alekseev expressed a desire to join the Catholic Church; in 1927 he settled in the Franciscan monastery in Tsinanfu, where he studied Catholic theology. In 1928 he formally converted to Catholicism in Beijing, where the Apostolic Delegate Archbishop Celso Benigno Luigi Costantini performed the ritual of joining him to the Catholic Church. Alekseev founded a Russian Greek-Catholic parish in Shanghai. After the Second World War he emigrated to Argentina.

In Argentina, he lived in the monastery of Saint Michael (Spanish: San Miguel) and served in the Russian parish of Saints Peter and Paul Cathedral in Buenos Aires. In 1951 he began to help the priest George Kovalenko. Alekseev died in Buenos Aires on April 23, 1952, at the age of 82 years.
