= Nina Kirsanova =

Ballet dancer and teacher (1898–1989)

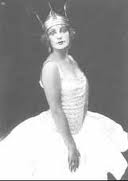
- A black-and-white picture of the artist.
- Born: Nina Vasilyevna Vanner; July 21, 1898; Moscow, Russian Empire
- Died: February 3, 1989 (aged 90); Beograd, SFR Yugoslavia
- Occupations: Ballet dancer, choreographer, ballet teacher, nurse, archaeologist, actress
- Years active: 1916–1989

Nina Vasilyevna Kirsanova (Russian: Нина Васильевна Кирсанова), born Nina Vasilyevna Vanner (Нина Васильевна Ваннер; 21 July 1898 – 3 February 1989) was a Russian-born Yugoslav ballet dancer, one of the most important ballet artists in Belgrade, who distinguished herself as a lead principal dancer, choreographer, head of ballet and ballet teacher. She also spent time as a nurse, archaeologist and actress.

== Early life and education ==
She was born in Moscow on 21 July 1898, to the family of Vasily and Zinaida Vanner (née Simis). She adopted the name "Kirsanova" as her stage name. Her family included three theatrical artists: her paternal grandfather, Wilhelm Vanner, a ballet dancer at the Bolshoi Theatre; her maternal grandmother, Yelisaveta Medvedeva, an actress; and her uncle Mikhail Medvedev, an opera soloist at the Bolshoi Theatre. Her mother, Zinaida, was a doctor.

Nina began her ballet education relatively late, at the age of twelve, at Lydia Nelidova's private school in Moscow, after persuading her reluctant parents to let her train. From 1916 to 1918, she attended the Moscow Theatre School in the class of Vera Mosolova. She continued her education at the Higher Study Department of the Bolshoi Theatre under the guidance of ballet master Laurent Novikoff, who enabled her professional debut on 1 October 1916, in the role of Odile in the ballet Swan Lake. Kirsanova completed her advanced training in 1919 in the class of the famous Alexander Gorsky, which officially marked the beginning of her career. That same year, she married Boris Popov, an opera soloist at the Bolshoi Theatre. At his urging, Nina applied and passed the audition for the Bolshoi Theatre, but she never performed on its famous stage because she fled to Poland with her husband as early as 1921.

== Career ==
=== Early career and emigration (1921–1923) ===
Nina and Boris resided in Poland between 1921 and 1923, performing in Warsaw, Kraków, and Lviv. During her time in Lviv, Nina collaborated with Aleksandr Fortunato, a Polish artist, dancer, and ballet master who had been trained in Moscow. In mid-1923 Nina and Aleksandr accepted an engagement at the Romanian National Opera in Bucharest.

On June 15, 1923, Nina Kirsanova left Poland for Yugoslavia together with her husband, Boris Popov, and colleague Aleksander Fortunato. After traveling through Berlin, Paris, and Vienna, they arrived in Dubrovnik, where they met Petar Konjović, the then-director of the Zagreb Opera, who offered them a guest engagement. They performed in Zagreb in September 1923. Although the guest appearance was successful, Kirsanova arranged a performance in Belgrade with Stanislav Binički. Thus, in September 1923, she arrived in the Yugoslav capital for the first time.

Nina Kirsanova made her Belgrade debut on November 7, 1923, at a "Ballet Evening" in the Manege, performing alongside Aleksander Fortunato. Her excellent reception by the audience and positive relationships with the National Theater management and prima ballerina Elena Poliakova led to an offer of a permanent engagement. Due to prior commitments in Bucharest, Kirsanova and Fortunato officially joined the Belgrade Ballet on February 24, 1924 — she as the principal dancer and he as the lead dancer and director of the Ballet. That same year, on April 24, Kirsanova and her husband were granted citizenship of the Kingdom of Yugoslavia.

=== Belgrade period (1923–1926) ===
Nina’s initial engagement at the National Theatre spanned three seasons (1923–1926), during which she became a favorite of the Belgrade audience and earned high critical acclaim. Beyond the capital, she performed in Sarajevo and Bucharest; in Romania, she and Aleksander Fortunato even performed at the royal court, presenting a repertoire that included both classical ballet and Serbian folk dances. Despite their great success, the engagement ended abruptly in 1926, likely for personal reasons. Kirsanova bid farewell to Belgrade on June 10, 1926, with a grand ballet concert, before moving to Paris with her husband and Fortunato to pursue an international career.

=== International career (1926–1931) ===
After leaving Belgrade in 1926, Nina Kirsanova moved to Paris, where she continued her training under renowned ballet masters Olga Preobrajenska and Lyubov Egorova. Between 1927 and 1931, she embarked on extensive world tours, beginning in South America with the "Gran Compania Lirica" under choreographer Bronislava Nijinska, partnering with Boris Kniaseff. In late 1927, Kirsanova joined the legendary Anna Pavlova Company, eventually rising to the position of first soloist and principal dancer. She performed across all five continents until Pavlova's death in 1931. This period brought her international acclaim and solidified her status as a world-class ballerina, performing a diverse repertoire on the world's most prestigious stages.

=== Return to Belgrade and artistic peak (1931–1934) ===
In May 1931, Nina Kirsanova returned to Belgrade, assuming the roles of prima ballerina, choreographer, and Head of the Ballet at the National Theatre. Over the following three seasons, she defined the company's artistic direction and led its first international tour to Athens in 1933 alongside Stevan Hristić. During this highly successful residency at the "Olympia" Theatre, Kirsanova staged several productions — including The Secret of the Pyramid and Polovtsian Dances — while performing lead roles such as Odile in Swan Lake. Her leadership during this period brought the Belgrade Ballet its first major international acclaim.

During her tenure at the National Theatre in Belgrade, Nina Kirsanova explored a synthesis of classical ballet and the modern "plastic" style. Her key works from this period include Man and Fate (1934), inspired by Massine’s symphonic ballet, and Sonata of a Great City (1934), based on Kurt Jooss's expressionist model set to music by Alexandre Tansman. Although the audience warmly received her innovative and expressionistic approach, contemporary critics — most notably Branko Dragutinović — sharply attacked her departure from traditional forms and her perceived leaning toward "acrobatics." Due to deep disagreements with the management and scathing reviews following the premiere of Autumn Poem, Kirsanova left Belgrade in 1934, leaving behind a significant, albeit controversial, attempt to align Serbian ballet with modern European trends.

=== Work abroad (1934–1940) ===
Following her success in Belgrade, Kirsanova moved to Monaco, where she served as prima ballerina, choreographer, and Head of Ballet at the Opéra de Monte-Carlo (1934–1937). During this time, she toured extensively across Europe, including the Netherlands, England, and Spain. Her international career continued at the Lithuanian National Opera (1937/1938) and the Bulgarian Opera. Despite her global engagements, Kirsanova maintained a strong connection with Belgrade, returning frequently as a guest star until 1942. During these visits, she also choreographed ballet sequences for operas, most notably for Orpheus in Belgrade and Ero the Joker (Ero s onoga svijeta) in Sofia in February 1940.

== The Second World War ==
The outbreak of World War II found Kirsanova in France, but she managed to return to Belgrade in 1940, the city she had chosen as her permanent home. On July 5, 1940, she opened a private ballet studio on Riga od Fere Street, marking the beginning of her influential career as a pedagogue. In May 1942 Kirsanova accepted the position of Head of Ballet at the National Theatre. Despite the immense difficulties of the wartime occupation, she successfully preserved the ensemble and maintained its operations until August 1944, when the theatre closed during the battles for the liberation of Belgrade. Many of her students from this period eventually became principal dancers of the National Theatre.

From the onset of the Allied bombing of Belgrade in April 1944 through the battles for the city's liberation in October, she worked as a surgical nurse in the Orthopedic Department of the General State Hospital. As part of a dedicated medical team, she worked day and night to assist thousands of wounded partisans, Red Army soldiers, and civilians. She continued her service at the hospital until early 1946.

== Later career and pedagogy ==
Nina Kirsanova’s final engagement with the Belgrade National Theatre lasted from 1946 to 1950. During this time, she played a pivotal role as a co-founder of the Theatre's Ballet Studio (1946) and the State Ballet School (1947), where she dedicated herself to teaching classical ballet and historical dance. She bid farewell to the National Theatre stage on December 18, 1951, by choreographing Swan Lake, a production that also marked her 35th anniversary as an artist and featured her final stage appearance. Her formal retirement from performing took place during a solo concert on February 23, 1952. She continued to serve as a choreographer for the State Ballet School until her retirement in 1962.

Following her departure from the Belgrade National Theatre, Kirsanova focused on establishing and professionalizing ballet companies throughout Yugoslavia. In Rijeka (1949) and Sarajevo (1950), she staged the very first ballet productions in the history of those theaters. Notably, the Sarajevo Ballet officially commenced its professional operations with her original work, The Harvest (Žetva), for which she wrote the libretto and provided both the direction and choreography to the music of Boris Papandopulo. Her most extensive collaboration was with the Macedonian National Theatre in Skopje (1950–1960), where she staged eleven productions — seven ballets and four opera choreographies — and led the ensemble to its first domestic and international festival appearances. Kirsanova concluded her international career in 1961–1962 at the "Olympia" Theatre in Athens, where she staged her final works, including Les Sylphides, Straussiana, and choreographies for the operas Moses and Prince Igor.

== Archaeology and later life ==
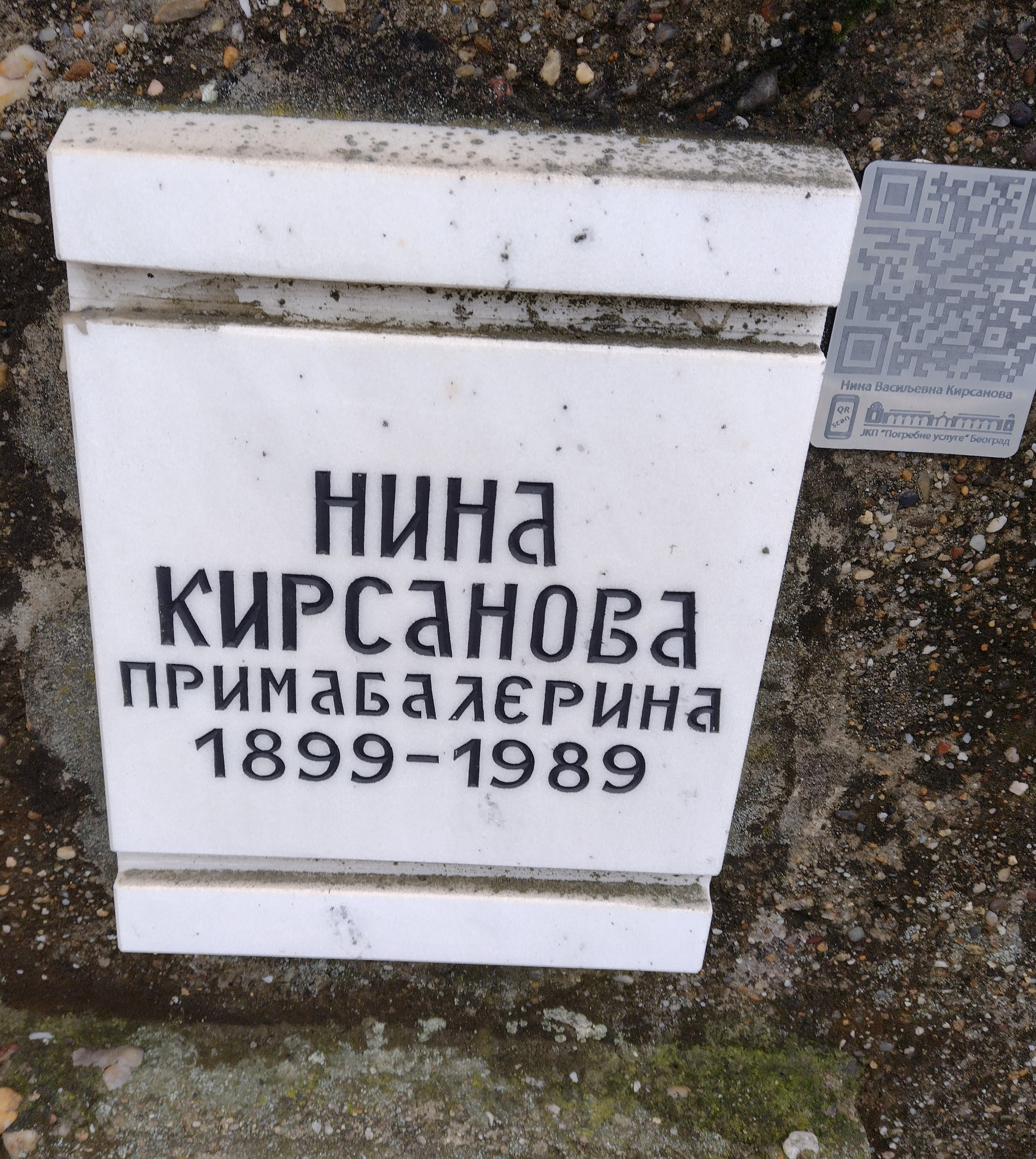
Grave of Nina Kirsanova in the New Cemetery in Belgrade

Following her retirement from the ballet, Nina Kirsanova embarked on an extraordinary second career. In 1957, at the age of 59, she enrolled as an archaeology student at the University of Belgrade Faculty of Philosophy. She earned her bachelor's degree in 1964 and a master’s degree in 1969, defending her thesis, Music and Instruments of Ancient Egypt, under the mentorship of Dušan Glumac. She also began work on a doctoral dissertation titled Dances of the Ancient Mediterranean, though her advanced age prevented its completion. As an archaeologist, she participated in excavations throughout Yugoslavia, Greece, Turkey and Egypt.

In 1972, fifty years after her emigration, Nina Kirsanova visited her homeland for the first time since the revolution. Upon receiving permission from the Soviet authorities, she traveled to Moscow, where she reunited with relatives and visited various theaters and archives. During this visit, she succeeded in retrieving significant personal documents related to her early life and the beginning of her ballet training.

Nina Kirsanova's life and career were documented in a television film directed by Nikola Rajić and an episode of the program Srdačno vaši hosted by Ivan Hetrich. In 1983, she appeared in the feature film Something in Between (Nešto između), directed by Srđan Karanović, in the role of the protagonist's grandmother. The Museum of Theatre Arts of Serbia also preserves memorial audio recordings of Kirsanova conducted in 1970 and 1971.

Nina Kirsanova lived a modest life in Belgrade, residing first on Riga od Fere Street and later on Sime Miloševića Street. Throughout her later years, she remained deeply connected to the Belgrade ballet scene, attending performances and competitions as long as her health permitted. Kirsanova died in Belgrade on February 3, 1989, at the age of 90. She was interred with honors in the Alley of the Greats at the New Cemetery in Belgrade.
