= Brailiv =

Rural locality in Vinnytsia Oblast, Ukraine

Brailiv Браїлів
- Rural settlement
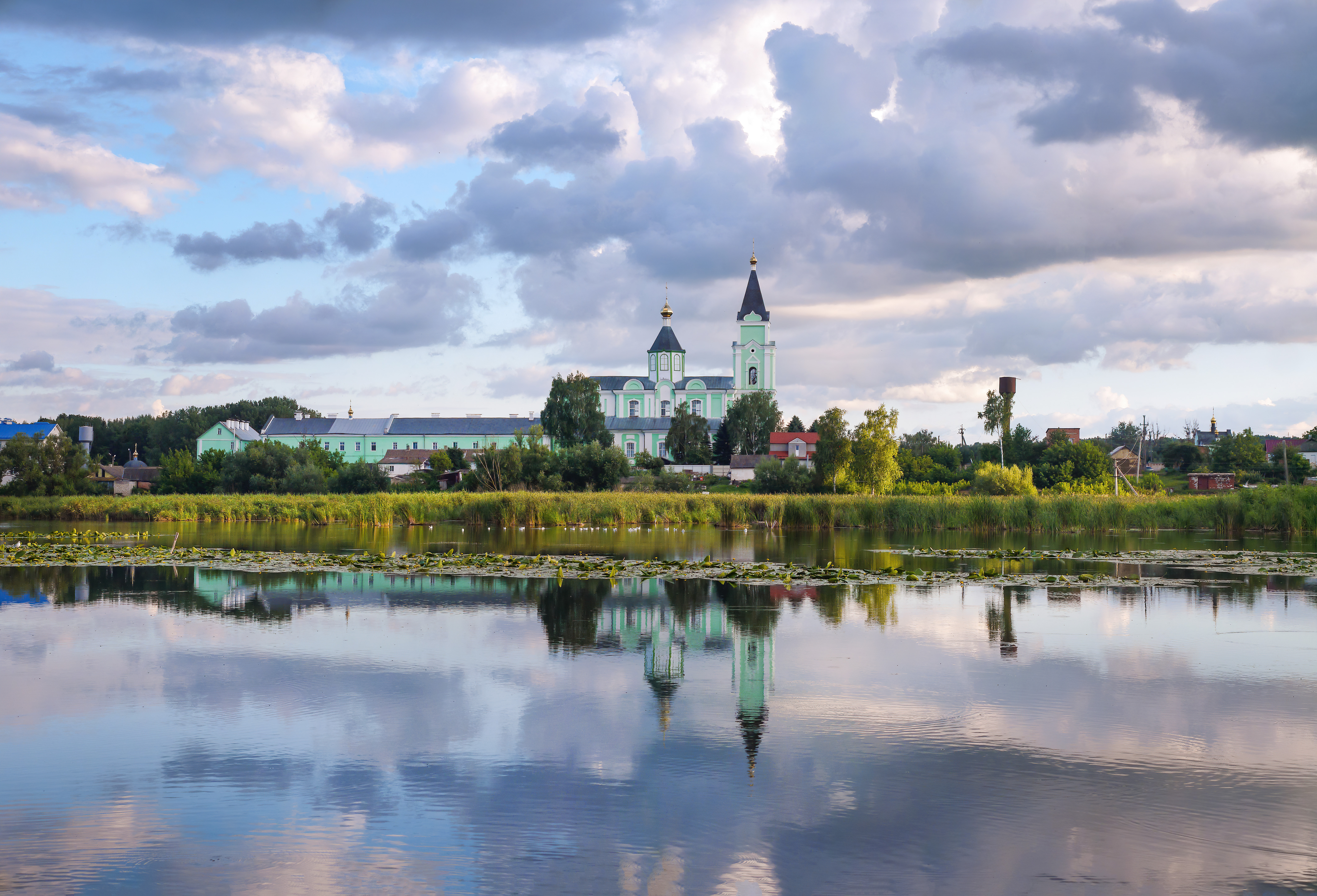
- Trinity Monastery

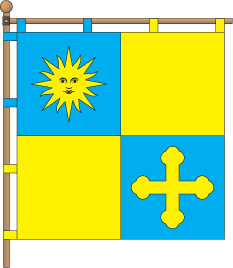
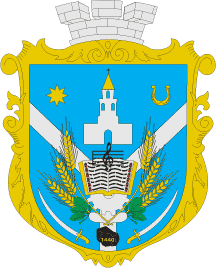
- Flag Coat of arms

- Location in Vinnytsia Oblast Location in Ukraine
- Country: Ukraine
- Oblast: Vinnytsia Oblast
- Raion: Zhmerynka Raion
- Hromada: Zhmerynka urban hromada

Population (2022)
  - Total: 4,382
- Time zone: UTC+2 (EET)
  - Summer (DST): UTC+3 (EEST)

Brailiv (Ukrainian: Браїлів) is a rural settlement in Zhmerynka Raion of Vinnytsia Oblast in Ukraine. It is located on the banks of the Riv, a tributary of the Southern Bug. Brailiv belongs to Zhmerynka urban hromada, one of the hromadas of Ukraine. Population: 4,382 (2022 estimate)

== History ==
Brailiv is located in the historical region of Eastern Podillia.

In April 1919 Brailiv was a site of battles between the Sich Riflemen and Bolsheviks. In August of the same year 6th Brigade of the Ukrainian Galician Army fought there against Bolshevik forces.

Following the German occupation of Brailov on July 17, 1941, the town's Jewish population was subjected to severe forced labor, extortion, and systematic killing, culminating in the complete liquidation of the local ghetto by summer 1942. Under the administration of Hans Graf and the Gendarmerie, mass shootings, including those of 800 Jews in February 1942 and a final group of 503 in June/July 1942, resulted in the town being declared "judenrein".

Until 26 January 2024, Brailiv was designated urban-type settlement. On this day, a new law entered into force which abolished this status, and Brailiv became a rural settlement.

== Economy ==
=== Industry ===
Brailiv has been historically known as a centre of sugar industry and alcohol production.

=== Transportation ===
Brailiv railway station is not located in the urban-type settlement of Brailiv but in the settlement of Brailiv, a couple of kilometers southwest of the urban-type settlement, on the railway connecting Zhmerynka and Vinnytsia. There is some passenger traffic.

The settlement has access to Highway M21 connecting Vinnytsia and Mohyliv-Podilskyi.

== See also ==
- Brăila, Danube port in Muntenia, Romania
- Brailovsky (with variations), surname derived from the Russian form of the town's name, Brailov
