= Andrei Katkov =

Russian Catholic bishop (1916–1995)

Andrei Vladimirovich Katkov
- Apollo Vladimirovich Katkov
- Born: October 26, 1916 (age 109); Irkutsk, Russian Empire
- Died: September 18, 1995 (aged 78); Rome, Italy
- Occupation: Catholic bishop

Andrei Katkov, born Apollo Katkov, (26 October 1916 – 18 September 1995) was a Russian Catholic bishop.

== Early life ==
Born on October 26, 1916, in Irkutsk, in baptism was given the name Apollo, being baptized in the Russian Orthodox Church. Katkov later emigrated with parents to China and studied in the Catholic elementary school of Lyceum Marian Fathers, converting himself to Catholicism and entering in the Marian Congregation. His mother was Vera Panfilovna Katkova and his father Vladimir Katkoff (both were doctors). He had a sister- Vlentina Bogatyr (née Katkova) and a niece Marina Hookham (née Bogatyr) He lived for a time in Australia where he helped hundreds of immigrants from China and elsewhere, who were fleeing communism.

== In Rome ==
In 1939 brother Andrew went to Rome to continue his education, where he enrolled at the Faculty of Philosophy of the Pontifical University of St. Thomas Aquinas, Angelicum.

In 1941 in Rome, received the eternal vows. Priestly ordination of Father Andrew was held on July 30, 1944, by bishop Alexander Evreinov.

In 1945 he was awarded the degree of Doctor of Philosophy.

He graduated from the Pontifical Oriental Institute in Rome, lived in Russicum.

Sent to work in the refugee camps, helped Russian, who were threatened with forced extradition to the Soviet Union.

Father Andrew sent the children from the camps in Rome.

== Russian Diaspora ==
Next Katkov's pastoral ministry was England.

In 1950 he moved to England in 1951, he worked in Australia, where, together with Archimandrite George (Bryanchaninov) founded in Melbourne a missionary center for Eastern-rite Catholics. In Australia, the shape of Russian Catholics community of immigrants from China.

In 1958 Pope John XXIII summoned Katkov to Rome and was appointed titular bishop, being consecrated on December 21, 1958, by Bishop Alexander Evreinov.

Bishop Andrew was appointed ordained coadjutor bishop of the Byzantine rite. In September 1959, he traveled to Australia and served in Melbourne and Sydney. In the same year Bishop consecrated a church in honor of the Presentation of the Virgin in Montreal, Quebec, Canada.

From 1960 to 1984 was authorized by the Congregation for the Oriental Churches as Visitator for Russian living abroad.

Ordaining prelate of the Byzantine rite in Rome from 1971 to 1984, continued to help Russian immigrants often send parcels from their Russian assets to Harbin.

== Ecumenism and contacts with the ROC ==
In 1969 Katkov was an official guest of the Moscow Patriarchate, gained respect by his Russian Orthodox episcopal hosts.

Patriarch Alexei I himself personally presented a "Panaghia"(symbol of the Episcopate) to Bishop Andrei.

In August 1969, Bishop Katkov, at the invitation of Metropolitan Nicodemus (Rotov) visited the USSR, Moscow and other cities of Russia and Ukraine. Plane flew to Omsk, where he was met by the local Orthodox bishop Bishop Nicholas (Kutepov) and further train Bishop Katkov traveled to Irkutsk, where he was born and lived with his parents before emigrating to China. During this visit to Russia Bishop Andrei Katkov attended parochial Orthodox Church, where he was welcomed by Bishops rank, abbots and worshipers came for a blessing, the bishops of the MP reverently kissing him. During a visit to the Pskov-Caves Monastery with abundant gathering of the faithful governor, in the presence of Bishop Andrei Katkov, by many years these monks proclaimed Pope Paul VI. In the Trinity-Sergius Lavra Bishop Andrew prayed at the shrine of St. Sergius, and in Odessa met vacationing there Patriarch Alexy I (Simansky), who gave him a rosary with her hands and Panagia.

Shortly thereafter, on December 16, 1969, the then Metropolitan Alexei of Tallinn, now Patriarch Alexei II, acting as Director of Affairs of the Moscow Patriarchate, announced the Sacred Synod of the Russian Orthodox Church's decision to admit Catholics to receive communion in Russian Orthodox churches.

On July 21, 1970, on the feast of Our Lady of Kazan in the Julian calendar, Bishop Andrei Katkov, Apostolic Exarch of the Russian Catholics, made a transfer of the image of Kazan icon of a specially built Byzantine church at Fatima, Portugal. On July 26, 1970, Bishop Katkov consecrated a special room for icons. The image of the Virgin was not long before bought at auction for money specially assembled an international Catholic organization of the "Blue Army", dedicated to the Virgin of Fatima phenomenon.

== Final Years ==
In his later years, Bishop Andrew Katkov lived in Rome. In 1977 he retired due to ill-health. He died on September 18, 1995.

As of 2017 a successor had not been named.
