= Vladimir Kolupaev =

Russian Byzantine Catholic priest (born 1964)

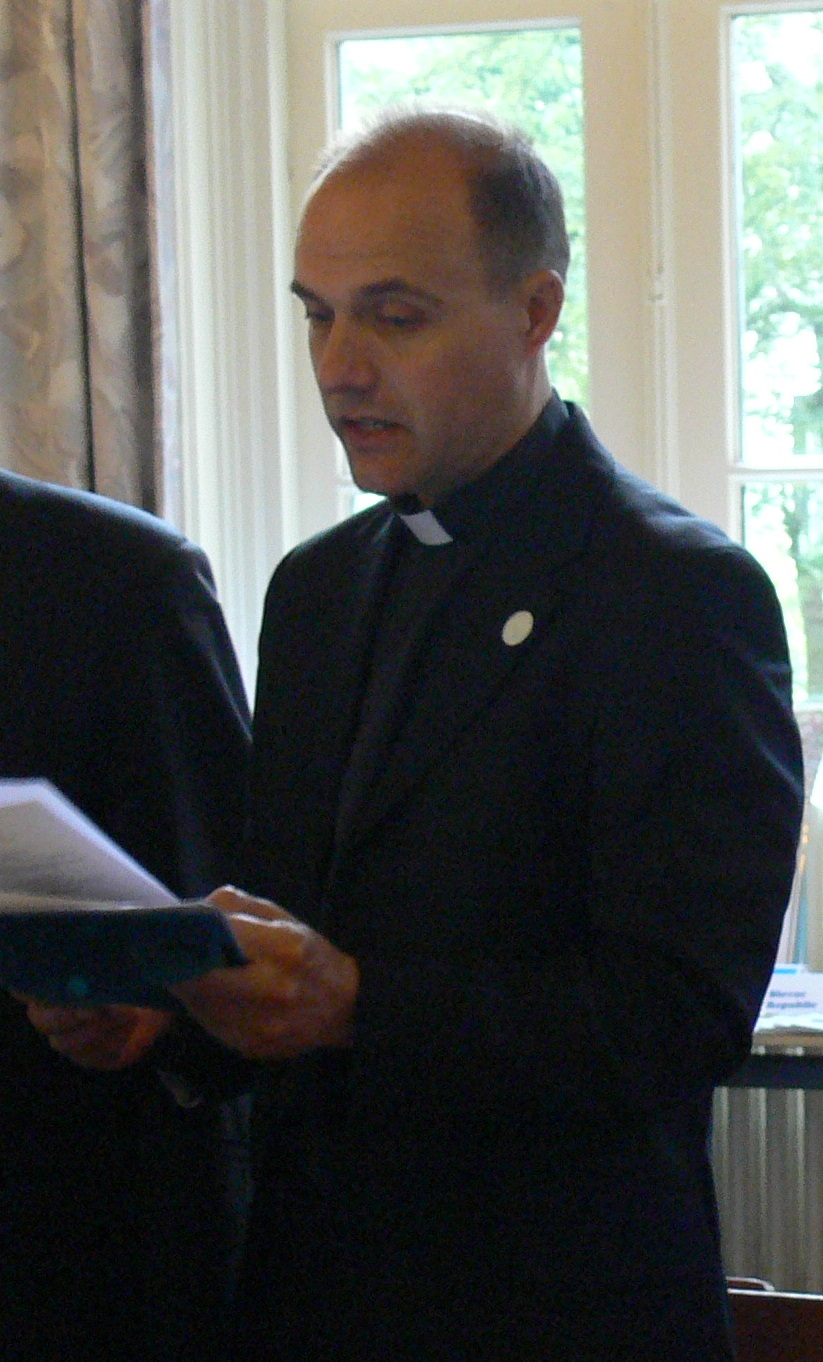
Rev. Dr. Vladimir Kolupaev

Vladimir Evgenievich Kolupaev (Russian: Владимир Евгеньевич Колупаев; born 17 September 1964, Mesherskoye, Chekhovsky District, Russia) is a historian, a Doctor of Historical Sciences, a graduate of the Moscow State Art and Cultural University, and a Catholic priest.

== Biography ==
Since 1989, Kolupaev has been a monk named Rostislav. He was ordained an Orthodox priest in 1989 but moved to Catholicism in 2004, joining the UGCC Ukrainian Catholic Archeparchy of Lviv.

Kolupaev's scientific interests cover various topics: the history, culture, and religious life of the Russian diaspora. He has taught historical subjects in Moscow, Kaluga, Obninsk, and Novosibirsk. He is the author of several books and research papers in Russian and foreign publications, and a member of national and international scientific conferences. He is also a member of the International Scientific Committee and the Italian edition of the magazine La Nuova Europa. He is a member of the editorial board of the scientific and educational journal Studia Humanitatis. He works at the Christian Russia centre in Seriate, Italy.

Kolupaev is a contributor to a database entitled "Personalità: Martiri – Chiesa cattolica, Confessori della Fede – Chiesa cattolica".

He also works as a spiritual assistant to the international movement "Mothers' Prayers".

== Scholarship ==
PhD thesis: "Russians in North Africa 1920 - 1998."

Doctoral thesis: "Publishing activities of the Russian Orthodox Church Abroad in the 20th century."

Brussels publishing " Life with God ": Book World Russians abroad in the 20th century. Radiomissiya for Soviet listeners. Monograph. Saarbrücken: LAP Lambert Academic Publishing GmbH & Co., 2012. 336 p., Ill. ISBN 978-3-8484-0980-8 UDC 002.2 (470 493) 325.2 (470) BBK 76.17 +86.3 to 61 Scientific Publication

"Life of Bishop Paul Meleteva: Serving Church and Homeland in Russia, in the Soviet Union and abroad." Monograph. Saarbrücken: LAP Lambert Academic Publishing GmbH & Co., 2012. 125 s., Ill. ISBN 978-3-659-12583-6, ISBN 3659125830

Orthodox book Russians abroad in the first half of the 20th century : the history of the printing fraternity Job Pochaev, Volyn - Carpathians, 1903 - 1944. Monograph. M.: Publisher "Pashkov House", 2010. 272 p., Ill. ISBN 978-5751004323 Scientific Publication

Russians in the Maghreb. Monograph. M.: Publisher "Pashkov House", 2009. 415. ill. ISBN 978-5-7510-0435-4 Scientific Publication

Russian Church's presence in China, the Byzantine Rite Catholic Exarchate in Harbin 1928 - 1949. Monograph. 2013. p. 122. ISBN 978-3-8484-7969-6 Scientific Publication
