= Leonid Brailovsky =

Russian architect (1867–1937)

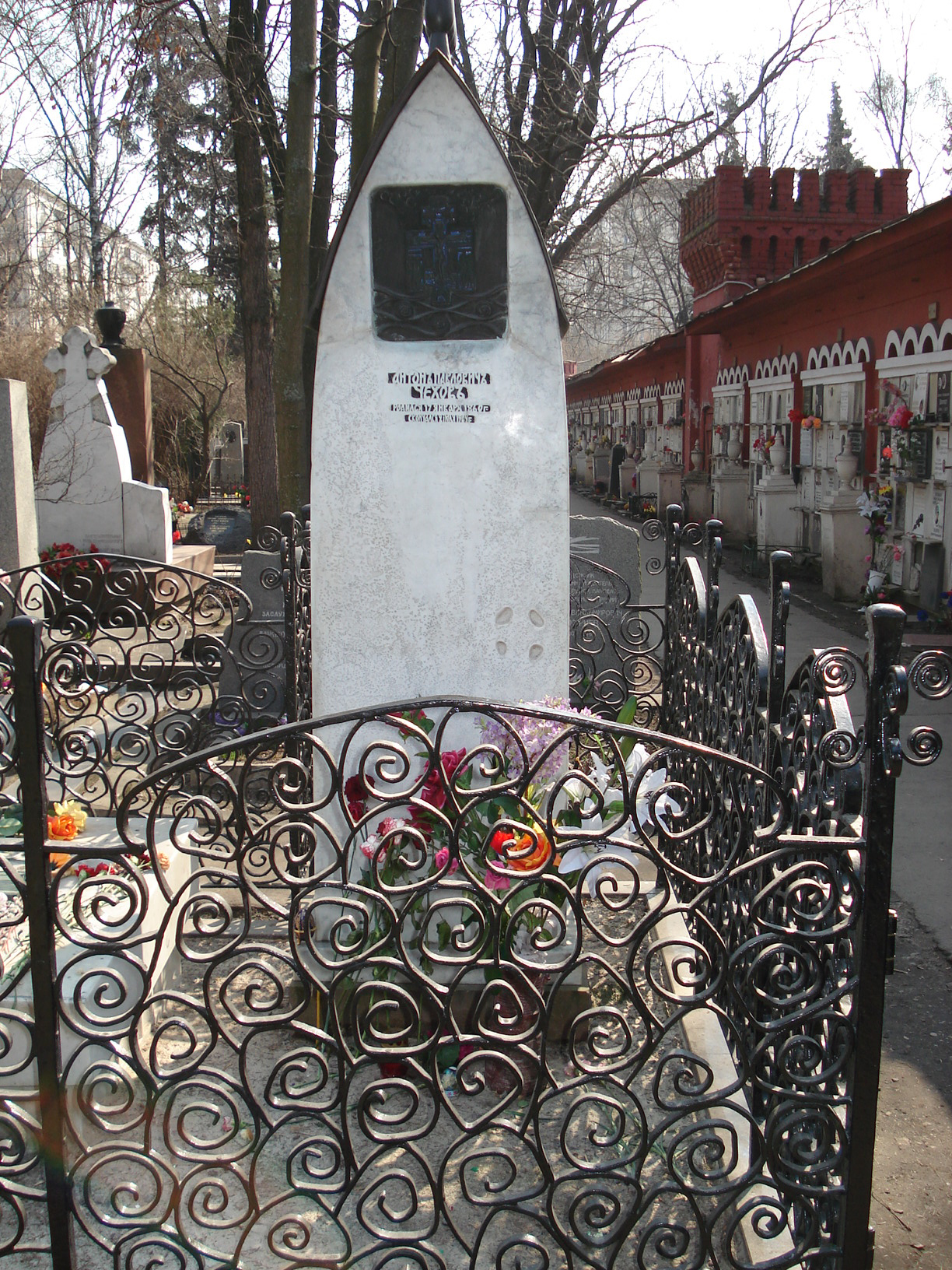

Leonid Brailovsky (Brailovskii) (23 May 1867, Kharkiv, now Ukraine – July 7, 1937, Rome, Italy) was a Russian architect, artist, designer, decorator, teacher and a member of Russian apostolate in the Diaspora.

== Biography ==
Born in 1867 in Kharkiv in an Orthodox family. His father was mayor, his mother came from a noble family Sedlyarevskih. Brailovsky was educated in the classical school. He graduated from the department of architecture of the Imperial Academy of Arts in 1894 with the rank of class artist of architecture degree. During training, repeatedly awarded for academic success: in 1890 a small silver medal, in 1892 a large silver medal, in 1893 a small gold medal for the program "Hotel for visitors to the capital." After graduating from the Academy in 1895–1898 he served in the pensioner's trip to Paris and Rome. From 1898 he taught architecture at the Moscow School of Painting, Sculpture and Architecture in 1899, he joined a teacher at the Stroganov Moscow State University of Arts and Industry and Served as professor of the School, and in 1906 was a member of the Education Committee.

Brailovsky worked as an architect, but was best known as the artist-akvalerist creating watercolors of ancient ruins, monuments, the interiors of temples and palaces. In the 1900s he studied and copied fresco paintings in the churches of Yaroslavl, Rostov and Novgorod. He participated in the exhibitions of the Society of Russian watercolors, the Moscow Association of Artists, New Society of Artists, a member of the Society of Architects and Artists, Moscow Archaeological Society and the Moscow Architectural Society (MAO). He was a member of the Editorial Board of "Yearbook of Mao." He worked as a decorator: doing interior design, performed sketches of furniture and articles of bronze. From 1909, he worked primarily as a set designer. In this capacity ofrmlyal performances Lesser and Greater theaters. In 1916, Brailovsky was awarded the title of Academician. After the October Revolution in 1917, with his wife Rimma, emigrated first to Latvia, and later lived in Constantinople, Belgrade, and in 1925 he moved to Rome. In Belgrade, the designer worked the Theatre Royal, was a member of the Union of Employees of Russian art. In 1933 he founded the Vatican Museum of Russian religious architecture in the Congregation of Eastern Churches. In exile, created in the style of painting and graphics. In the 1920 – 1930 created a series of paintings "Visions of Old Russia." Exhibited in many cities, and his wife had two solo exhibitions in Paris (1930) and the Vatican (1932). He died in 1937 in Rome. His works are in museum collections of the Tretyakov Gallery, the Russian Museum, the Museum of the Sorbonne in Paris, the Vatican Museums and others.

== Conversion to Catholicism ==
Leonid and his wife Rima returned to the Catholic Church.

In 1932, an exhibition of 40 paintings by Brailovsky depicting monuments of Russian religious art. This collection was donated by Pope Pius XI and the latter has decided to organize a special unit of Russian painting. Secretary Pacelli and other dignitaries, as well as four Brailovsky was opened section of monuments of church art in Russia, in quantity of 100 paintings and 20 plans depicting the monuments of Russian ecclesiastical art and architecture.

One of those places where you could take a sip of his native air was Russicum with the Russian church, with family icons and expensive Slavic rites. Brailovsky were parishioners of the church. Years later, Archpriest Alexander Sipyagin who knew Leonid Mikhailovich wrote in his obituary: "Here, and especially in the Church of St. Anthony, the late felt like at home".

In 1933, the artist Leonid and his wife Rimma Brailovsky staged creative exhibition in Rome. Information about this event was placed in the press. Namely: "Messadzhero" published an article, a small article appeared in the "Tribune" and the "Osservatore Romano" has been placed an illustrated essay.

Memorial feedback on the Leonid Brailovsky left his friend and confessor of. Alexander Sipiagin:

"Far from home, went out the artist's life, patriot, Christian. His ashes taken to the cemetery of Campo Verano. "Mortal remains ... Russian Catholics – Leonid Mikhailovich Brailovsky known artist" rest in the grave "on a site donated by a pious cardinal to bury foreigners dying in Rome".

== Making plays ==
"Woe from Wit" by Alexander Griboyedov (1911, Little Theatre)

"Glass of Water" OE Scribe (1911, Little Theatre)

"The Duchess of Padua" O. Wilde (1912, Little Theatre)

"Assembly" Pyotr Gnedich (1912, Alexandrinsky theater costumes)

"Merchant of Venice" by William Shakespeare (1916, Little Theatre)

"Don Giovanni" WA Mozart (1916, Bolshoi Theatre)

== Projects and construction ==
Competition project apartment building Pertsova PN (1905 – 1906, Moscow, Prechistenskaya embankment)

The project's own villa (1906, Crimea)

Contest project of the new building MUZHVZ (1906 – 1907, Moscow)

Private Villa (1907, Tuapse)

Tombstone of Anton Chekhov, with Fyodor Schechtel (1907 – 1908, Moscow Cemetery)

Headstone composer Vasily Kalinnikov (1908, Yalta)

The theater building, together with Ivan Zholtovsky (1900s, Dnepropetrovsk)

Workshop building and rebuilding his own mansion (1911, Moscow)
