= Belz Voivodeship =

Former administrative division in Poland

Coordinates: 50°22′48″N 24°00′41″E

Bełz Voivodeship Województwo bełskie Белзьке воєводство
- Voivodeship of Polish–Lithuanian Commonwealth^{1}
- 1462–1793
- Banner Coat of arms

- Bełz Voivodeship of the Polish–Lithuanian Commonwealth.
- Capital: Belz
- Area
- 9,000 km^{2} (3,500 sq mi)
- History
  - Established: 1462
  - Second Partition of Poland: 1793
- Political subdivisions: counties: 4 plus 1 land
Preceded by	Succeeded by
Duchy of Belz / Duchy of Bełz	Kingdom of Galicia and Lodomeria / ingdom of Galicia and Lodomeria
- ¹ Voivodeship of the Polish Crown in the Polish–Lithuanian Commonwealth; Voivodeship of the Kingdom of Poland before 1569.

Bełz Voivodeship (Polish: Województwo bełskie, Latin: Palatinatus Belzensis) was a unit of administrative division and local government in the Kingdom of Poland from 1462 to the Partitions of Poland in 1772–1795. Together with the Ruthenian Voivodeship it was part of Red Ruthenia, Lesser Poland Province. The voivodeship was created by King Kazimierz Jagiellonczyk, and had four senators in the Senate of the Commonwealth (the Voivode and the Castellan of Bełz, as well as Castellans of Lubaczów and Busk).

== History ==
Bełz Voivodeship was formed in 1462 from the territories of the Duchy of Belz, after the Duchy was annexed by the Crown of the Kingdom of Poland. Zygmunt Gloger in his monumental book Historical Geography of the Lands of Old Poland gives a detailed description of the voivodeship:

“Belz, on the Zaloka river, was one of the oldest gords of the Czerwien Land. In 981, the province was seized by Vladimir the Great. Recovered by Bolesław Chrobry in 1018, it again became part of Rus’ after Chrobry’s death (...) In the early 14th century, the Land of Belz was inherited by Boleslaw Jerzy II of Mazovia, who in 1331 married Eufemia, the daughter of Grand Duke of Lithuania Gediminas and sister of Aldona of Lithuania, wife of Casimir III the Great. Boleslaw Jerzy died on April 7, 1340, and after his death, King Casimir seized Red Ruthenia together with Land of Belz (...) In 1387, King Wladyslaw Jagiello allowed his sister Alexandra of Lithuania to marry Siemowit IV, Duke of Masovia, giving her as dowry the Land of Belz. The province remained in the hands of sons and grandsons of Siemowit IV. The grandsons died childless in early 1462, and the Land of Belz became property of the Crown of the Kingdom of Poland, during the reign of King Kazimierz Jagiellonczyk.

The newly created Belz Voivodeship was slightly smaller than Lublin Voivodeship at approximately the same size as the Chełm Land. It was made of three counties: Lubaczów, Horodło and Szewlock, and in 1767, it was divided into the counties of Bełz, Grabowiec, Horodło, Lubaczów, and the Land of Busk. At local sejmiks in Belz, five deputies to the Sejm were elected, and the voivodeship had four starostas: Belz, Busk, Grabowiec and Horodlo (...) In the 17th century, the voivodeship, which was the smaller of all Lesser Poland voivodeships, had 483 villages and 33 towns (...) After the first partition of Poland (1772), almost whole voivodeship was annexed by the Habsburg Empire, as part of Galicia. What remained in Poland were towns of Dubienka and Korytnica, together with some villages (...) In 1793 the voivodeship ceased to exist, as after the second partition of Poland, its remaining parts were annexed by the newly created Chełm Voivodeship and Włodzimierz Voivodeship".

The area received an influx of szlachta from Mazovia, Lesser Poland and Greater Poland. In 1570–1580, 79% of the local noble families (among those of known provenance) was of Polish origin, while the percentage of Ruthenian and Wallachian noble families amounted to 15% and 4% respectively. Peasant strata of the population remained the least affected by migrations from the west.

== Municipal government ==
Voivodeship Governor (Wojewoda) seat:

- Bełz

Regional council (sejmik generalny) for all Ruthenian lands:

- Sądowa Wisznia

Regional council (sejmik) seats:

- Bełz

== Administrative division ==
- Bełz County, (Powiat Bełzski), Bełz
- Grabowiec County, (Powiat Grabowiecki), Grabowiec
- Horodło County, (Powiat Horodelski), Horodło
- Lubaczów County, (Powiat Lubaczowski), Lubaczów
- Busk Land, (Ziemia Buska), Busk

== Voivodes ==
- Rafał Leszczyński (1579-1636) (1619–1636)
- Jakub Sobieski (from 1638)
- Adam Mikołaj Sieniawski (from 1692 to 1710)
- Stanisław Mateusz Rzewuski (from 1726)

== Neighbouring Voivodeships and regions ==
- Ruthenian Voivodeship
- Volhynian Voivodeship
- Lublin Voivodeship
