= Turzyniec =

Turzyniec may refer to the following places in Poland:

- Turzyniec, Lublin Voivodeship, village in Lublin Voivodeship
- Turzyniec, West Pomeranian Voivodeship, village in West Pomeranian Voivodeship
