= Lesser Poland Province =

- proper (exact) dzielnica of Lesser Poland (pre-partition Kraków, Sandomierz and Lublin voivodeships)
- wider Lesser Poland Province of the Polish Crown (with Red Ruthenia, Podlachia and Kijowszczyzna)
