= Turzyniec, Lublin Voivodeship =

Turzyniec
- Village
- Location within Poland
- Coordinates: 50°37′54″N 22°56′43″E
- Country: Poland
- Voivodeship: Lublin
- County: Zamość
- Gmina: Zwierzyniec

Population (2011)
  - Total: 405
- Time zone: UTC+1 (CET)
  - Summer (DST): UTC+2 (CEST)

Turzyniec is a village in the administrative district of Gmina Zwierzyniec, within Zamość County, Lublin Voivodeship, in eastern Poland.

Turzyniec is a sołectwo of Gmina Zwierzyniec.

== History ==
The private noble village of Turzyniec was located at the turn of the 16th and 17th centuries in the Chełm Land in the Ruthenian Voivodeship in the Lesser Poland Province of the Kingdom of Poland.

Three Polish citizens were murdered by Nazi Germany in the village during World War II.
