= Chełm Voivodeship (1793) =

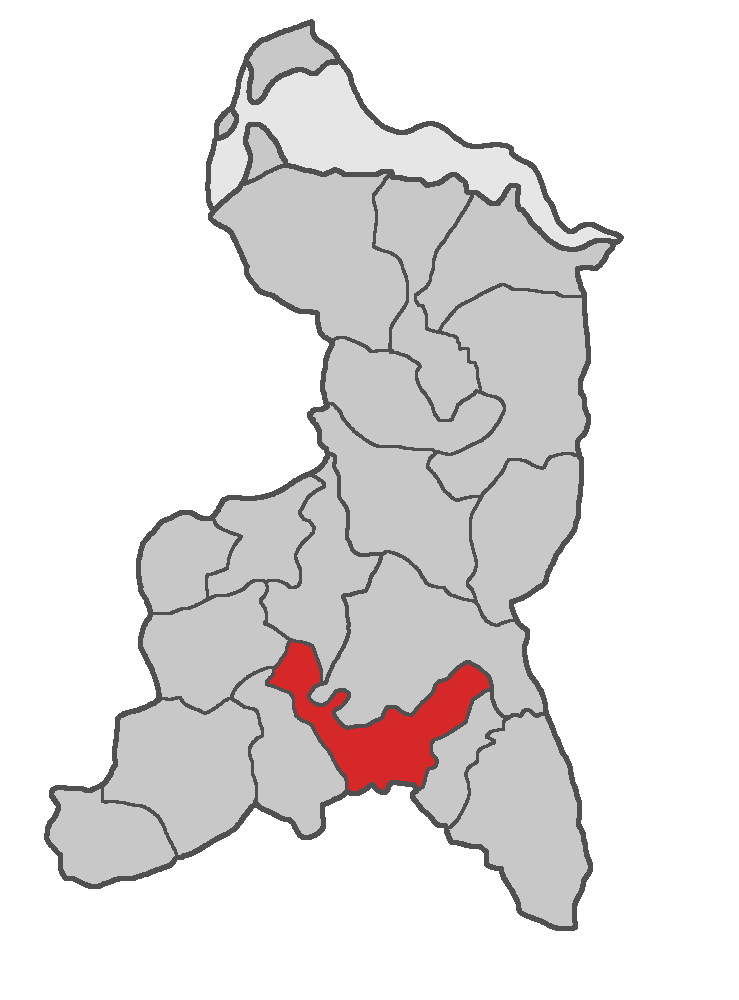
Chełm Voivodeship location

Chełm Voivodeship (1793) was created during the Grodno Sejm on November 23, 1793. The Voivodeship existed on Chełm Land. It was not fully organised because of the start of Kościuszko Uprising in 1794.

The Voivodeship consisted of three parts:

- Chełm Land
- Luków Land
- Parczew Land
