= Busk Land =

Busk Land (Polish: ziemia buska, Latin: Тerraе Buscensis) was an administrative unit of Polish county level (ziemia) in both the Kingdom of Poland and the Polish–Lithuanian Commonwealth. It was part of Belz Voivodeship, and existed from the 15th century until the Partitions of Poland, when its territory was annexed by the Habsburg Empire (1772).

It was named after the town of Busk (now Ukraine) and unlike the other subdivisions of the Belz Voivodeship, it was the only one that was not county (powiat).
