= Turzyniec, West Pomeranian Voivodeship =

Turzyniec
- Abandoned settlement
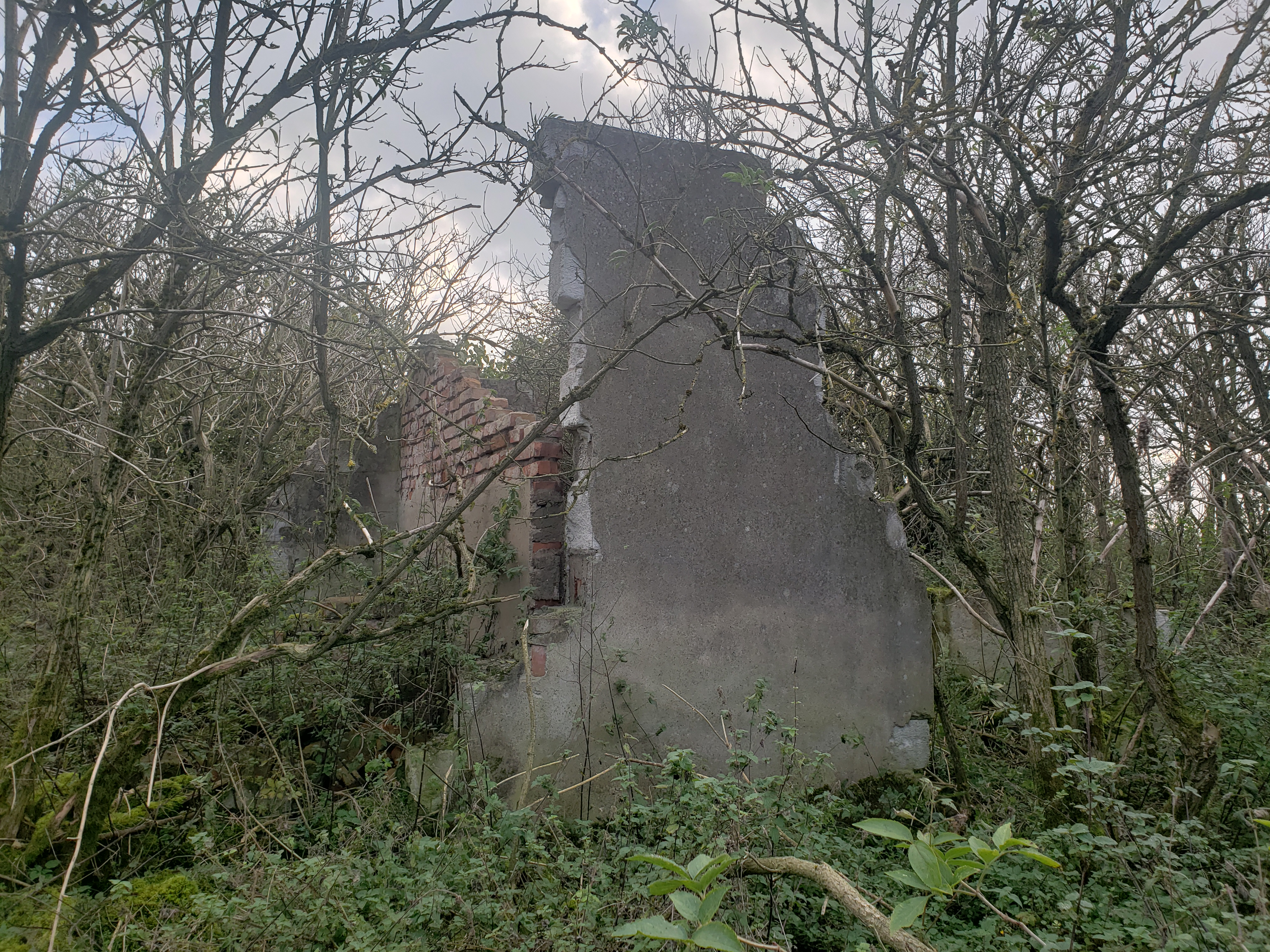
- Largest ruin in Turzyniec, a former building with two mostly intact walls

- Location within Poland
- Coordinates: 52°55′41″N 14°55′33″E
- Country: Poland
- Voivodeship: West Pomeranian
- County: Myślibórz
- Gmina: Myślibórz

Population
  - Estimate (2024): 0
- Time zone: UTC+1 (CET)
  - Summer (DST): UTC+2 (CEST)

Turzyniec [tuˈʐɨɲɛt͡s] (German: Domhof) is an abandoned settlement in the Gmina Myślibórz, within Myślibórz County, West Pomeranian Voivodeship, in western Poland. It is located between Renice and Myślibórz, administratively belonging to the village of Klicko since 1999.

== History ==
The area in which Turzyniec lies was inhabited by the Lusatian culture as early as the 7th century BC. The region was first integrated into Poland by Mieszko I during the 10th century and stayed part of the Polish realm until the 13th century when the area fell first to the Pomeranian dukes and then the Margraviate of Brandenburg.

During 1895 Turzyniec, then Domhof, was administratively part of the town of Soldin (Myślibórz) in the province of Brandenburg and had a population of 8. Known residents at the time included one Paul Johannes Karl Westphal, born in Domhof during 1894, and Auguste Emilie Schweitzer who married a man from Rehnitz in 1898.

It is unknown when the settlement was abandoned.

Between 1975 and 1998 the area belonged to the Gorzów Voivodeship.

== Gallery ==
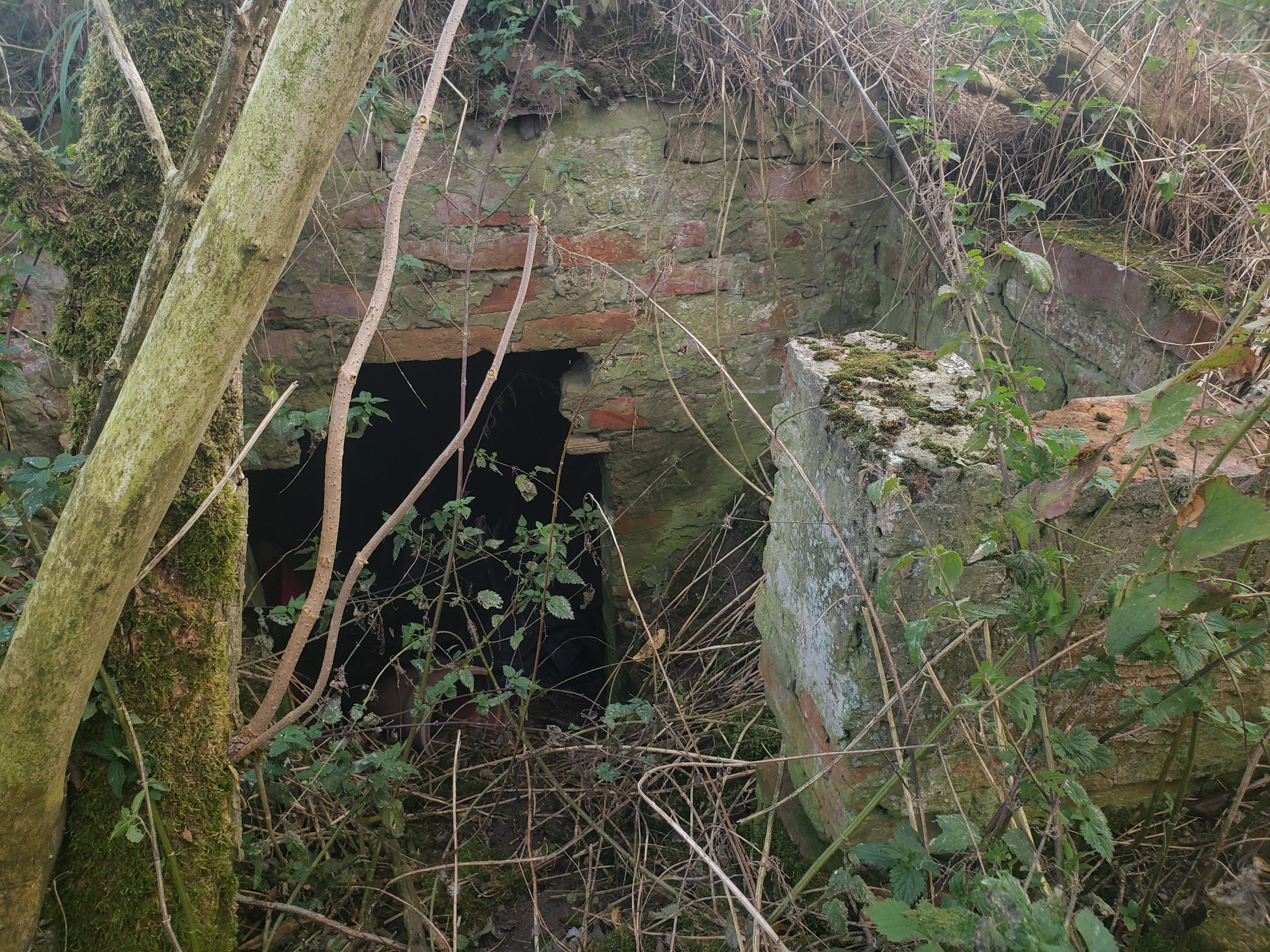
Ruin of a still fully intact basement

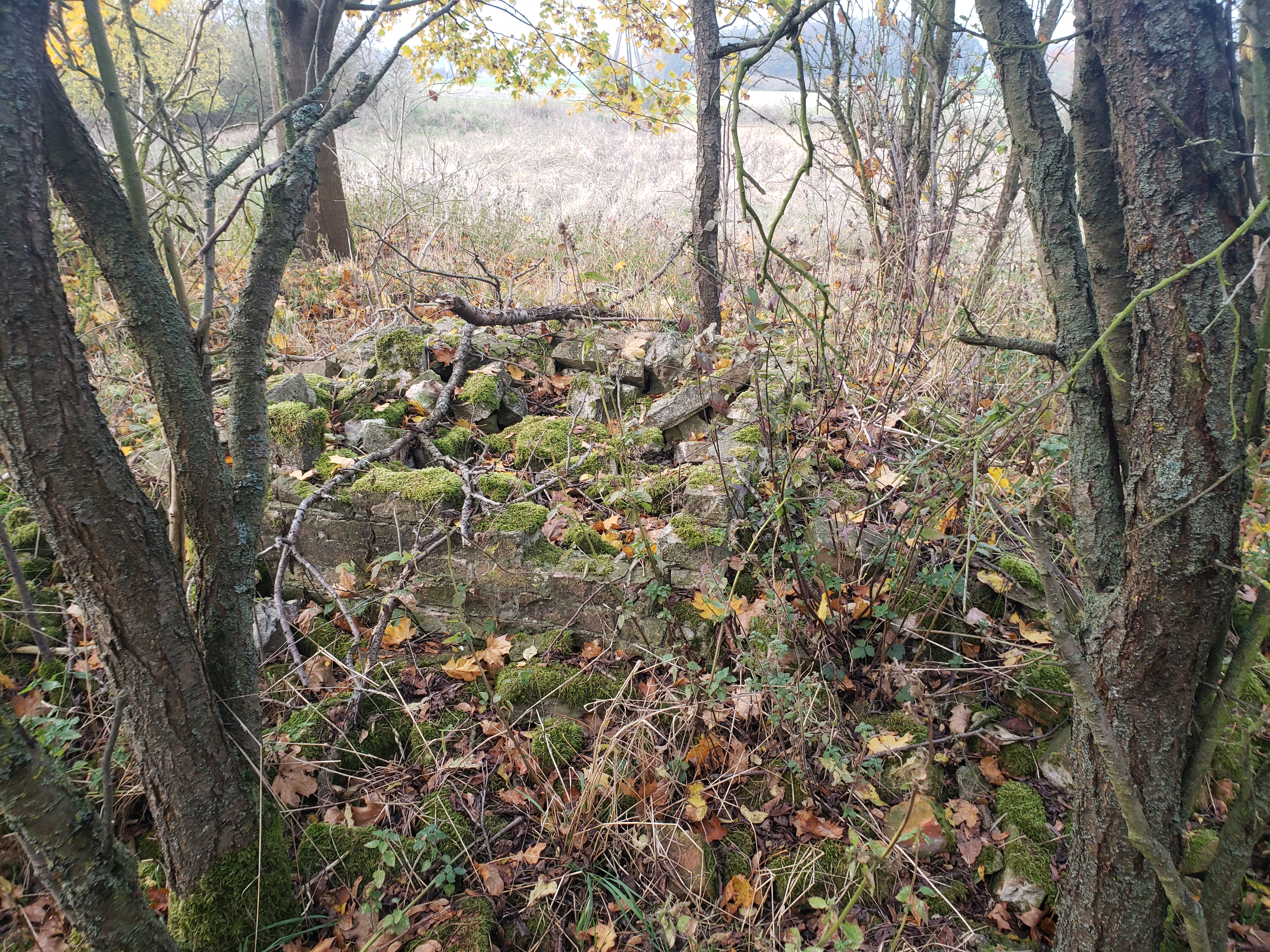
Ruins of a chimney from one of the buildings
