= Red Ruthenia =

Red Ruthenia Red Rus' Ruś Czerwona (Polish) Червона Русь (Ukrainian)
- Historic region
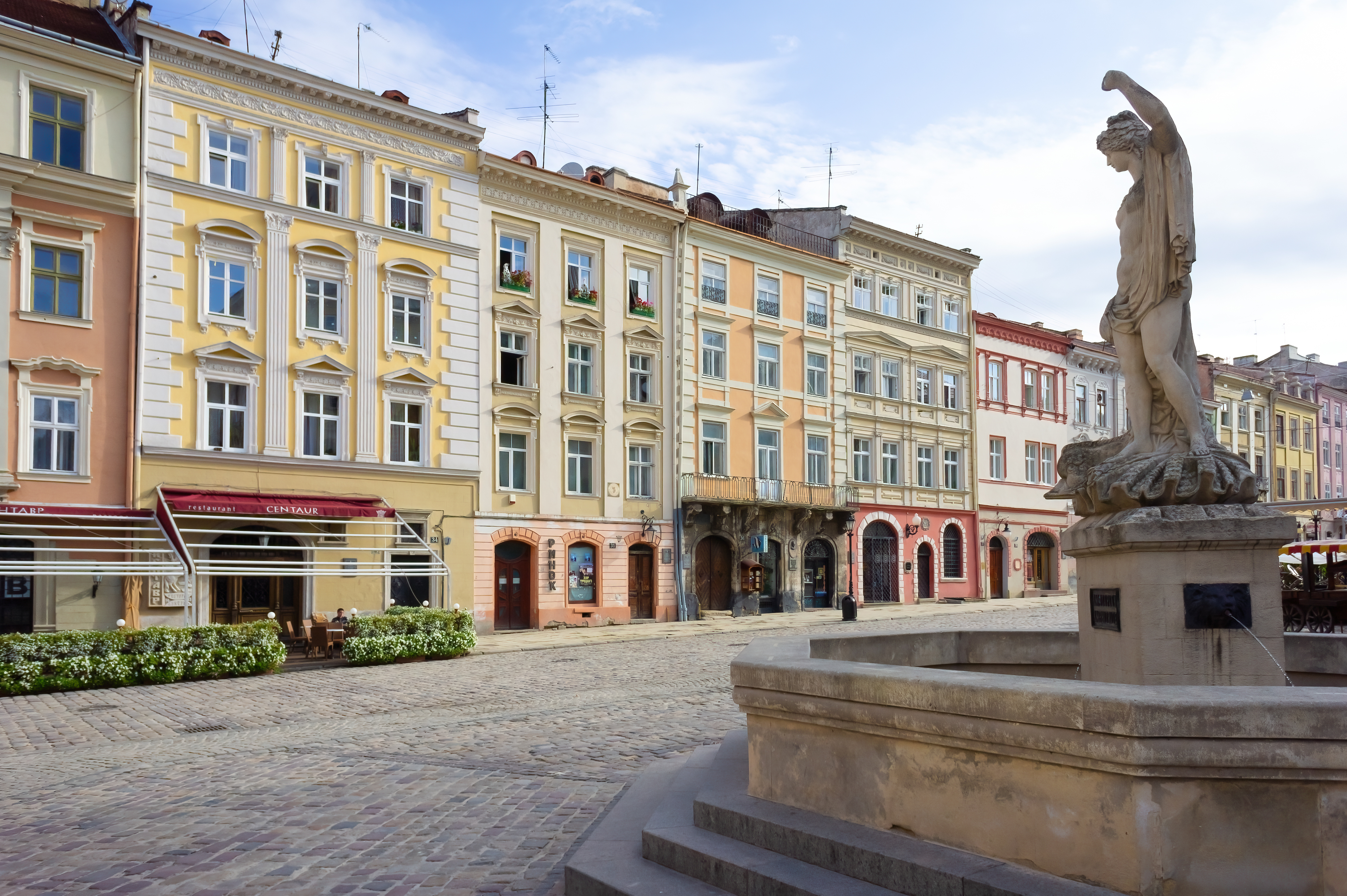
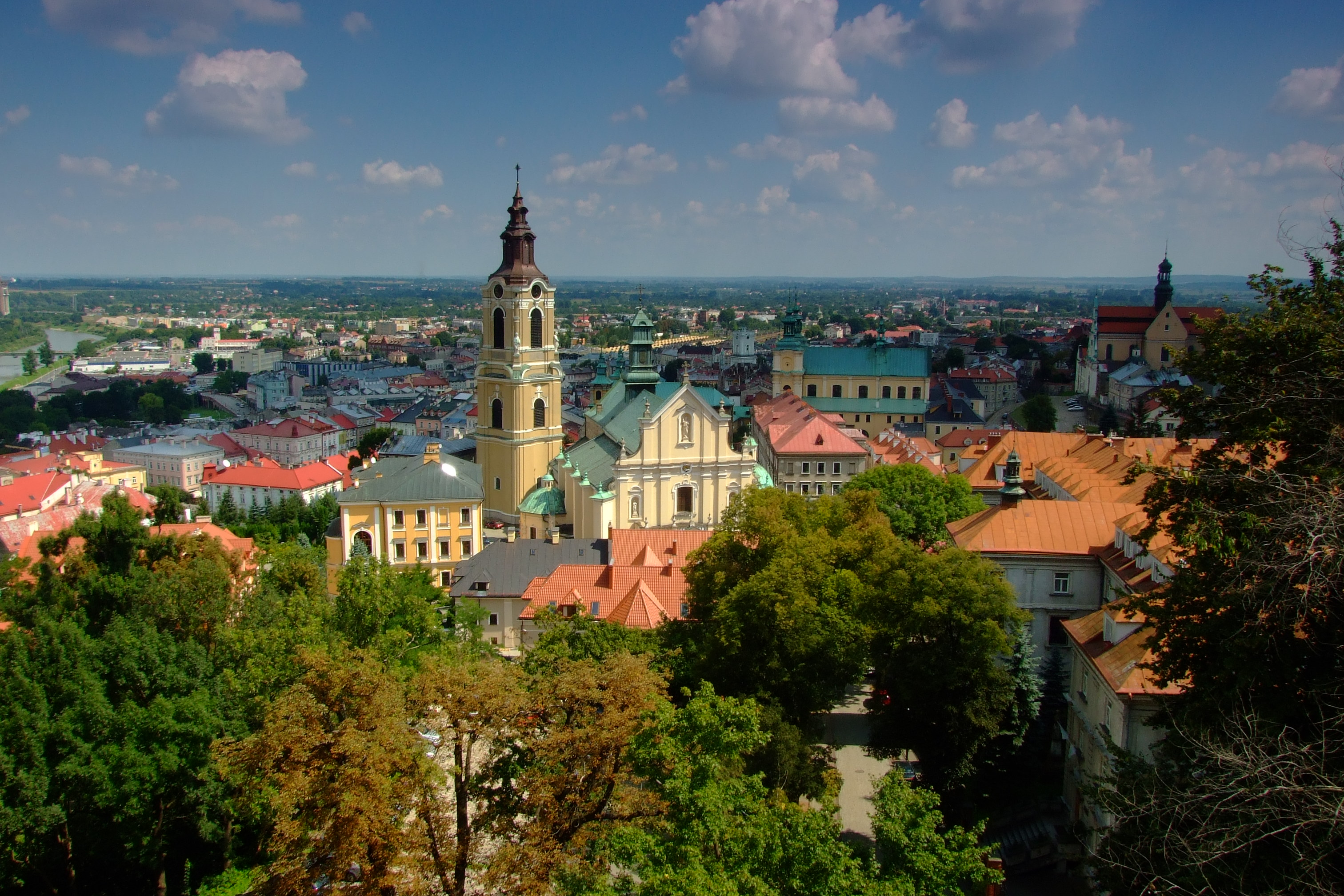
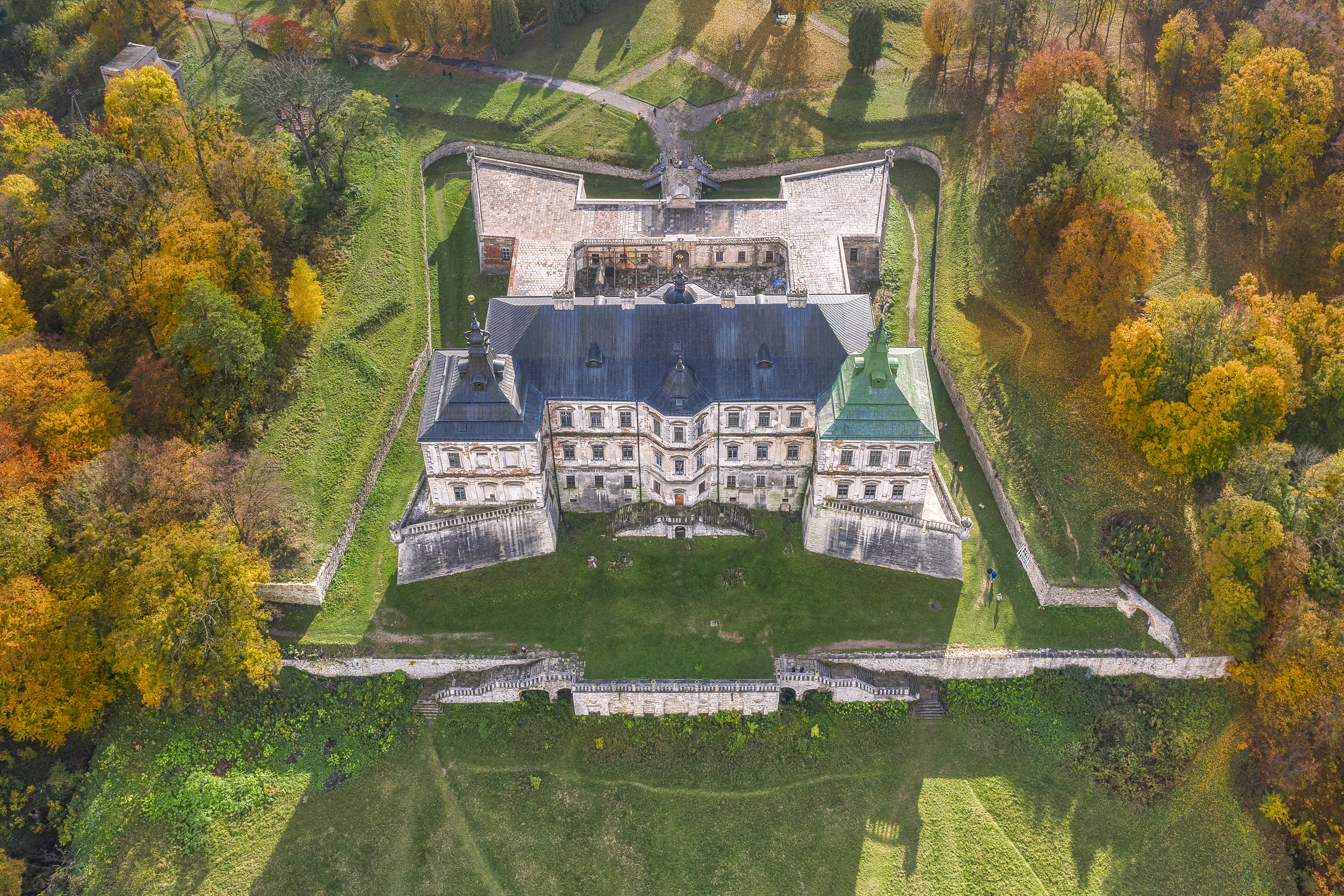
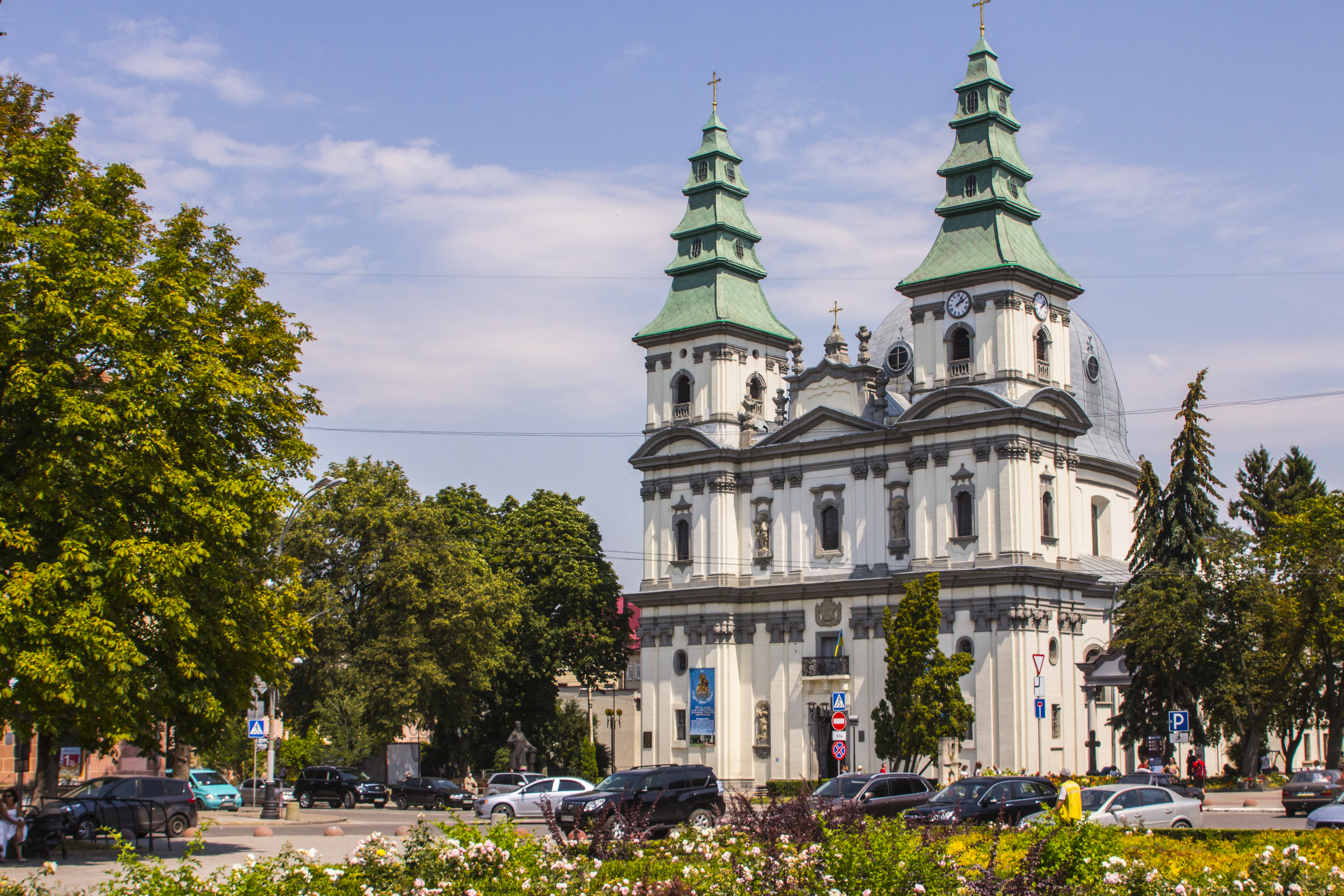
- From top, left to right: Market Square, Lviv; Panorama of Przemyśl; Pidhirtsi Castle; Cathedral of the Immaculate Conception of the Blessed Virgin Mary, Ternopil

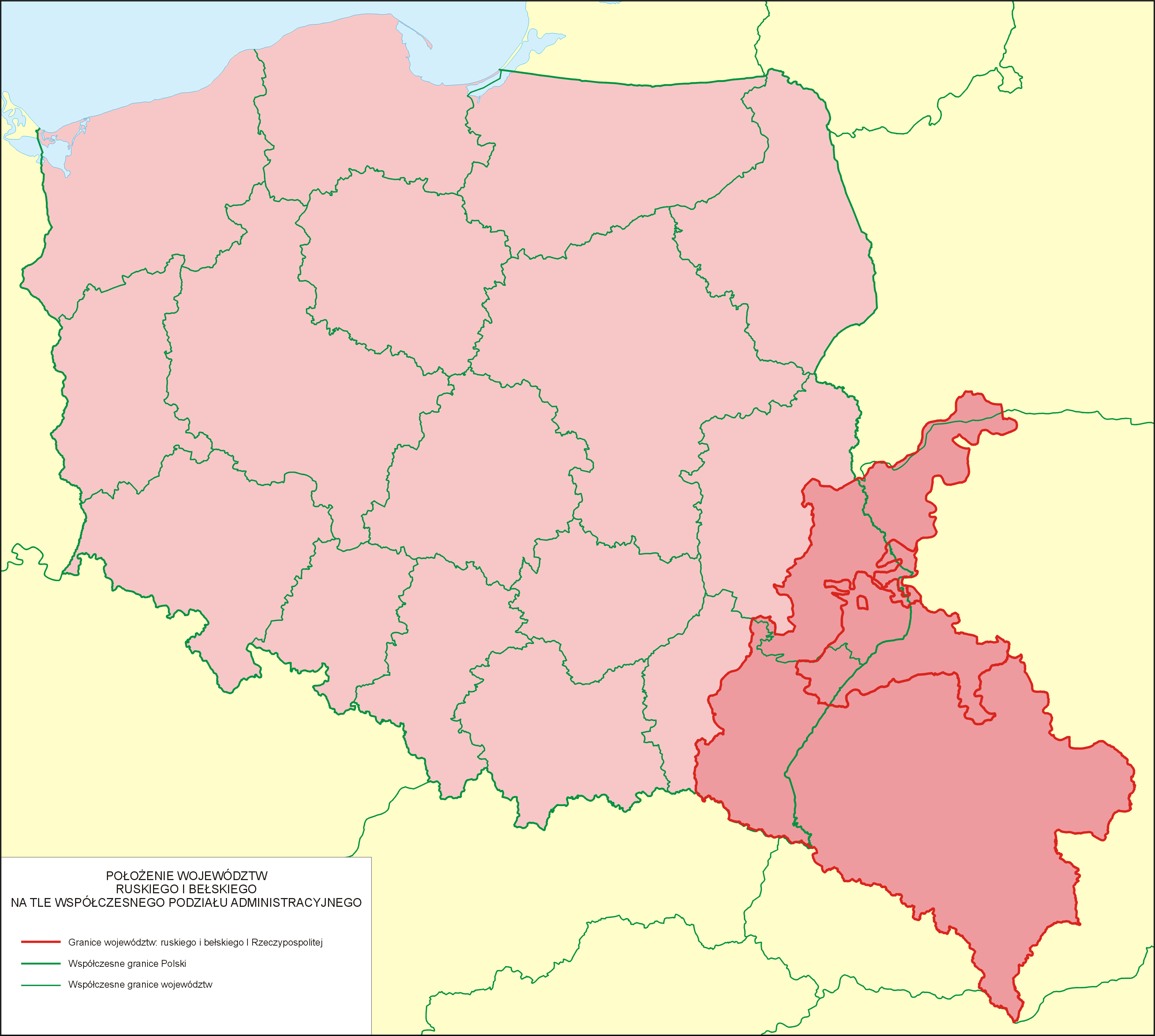
- Location of Red Ruthenia
- Country: Poland; Ukraine; Belarus
- Largest city: Lviv

Red Ruthenia, also called Red Rus' or Red Russia, (Note: In some older English-language literature, Red Russia is used as a synonym for Red Ruthenia, although the latter was eventually favoured by authors. For example, in his 1916 book on Poland, George Slocombe narrated how Bolesław II the Bold of Poland briefly took control of the Cherven Cities in the mid-11th century: "On two occasions Boleslaw restored Izaslaw, Grand Duke of Kieff, to the throne from which that ruler had been driven by his insurgent brothers. The Polish King's price for this assistance was the province of Red Russia, or, as it should more strictly be called, Red Ruthenia, which, however, did not long remain a part of Poland." After the 1917 October Revolution, Red Russia became a synonym for Soviet Russia in English.) (Note: Ukrainian: Червона Русь, romanized: Chervona Rus'; Polish: Ruś Czerwona; Latin: Ruthenia Rubra; Russia Rubra; Russian: Червoнная Русь, romanized: Chervonnaya Rus' or Russian: Красная Русь, romanized: Krasnaya Rus'; Romanian: Rutenia Roșie.) is a term used since the Middle Ages for the south-western principalities of Kievan Rus', namely the Principality of Peremyshl and the Principality of Belz. It is closely related to the term Cherven Cities (thought to mean "Red Cities"). (Note: 'Galicia remains in Poland for over four hundred years [after 1393], where it becomes known as "Red Ruthenia", named after the "Red Strongholds" (also called "Cherven Cities") in its western region.')

First mentioned by that name in a Polish chronicle of 1321, Red Ruthenia was the portion of Ruthenia incorporated into Poland by Casimir the Great during the 14th century. Following the Mongol invasion of Kievan Rus' in the 13th century, Red Ruthenia was contested by the Grand Duchy of Lithuania (the Gediminids), the Kingdom of Poland (the Piasts), the Kingdom of Hungary and the Kingdom of Galicia–Volhynia. After the Galicia–Volhynia Wars, for about 400 years, most of Red Ruthenia became part of Poland as the Ruthenian Voivodeship.

Nowadays, the region comprises parts of western Ukraine and adjoining parts of south-eastern Poland, as well as a small area of Belarus in Polesia (via the Chełm Land). It has also sometimes included parts of Lesser Poland, Podolia, Right-bank Ukraine and Volhynia. Centred on Przemyśl and Belz, it has included major cities such as: Chełm, Zamość, Rzeszów, Krosno and Sanok (now all in Poland), as well as Lviv and Ternopil (now in Ukraine).

== Objections to the term ==
The Polish historian Prof. Janeczek has advised against using the term Red Ruthenia in historical discourse, as it has ambiguous meaning, its geographical definition varying in different sources. The historical inhabitants of this region did not use the adjective "Red" themselves, they referred to their territory simply as "Rus" (Ruthenia)—without any modifier (for instance, the rulers of Galicia and Volhynia styled themselves in Latin as dux Russiae—"Prince of Ruthenia").

== Ethnography ==
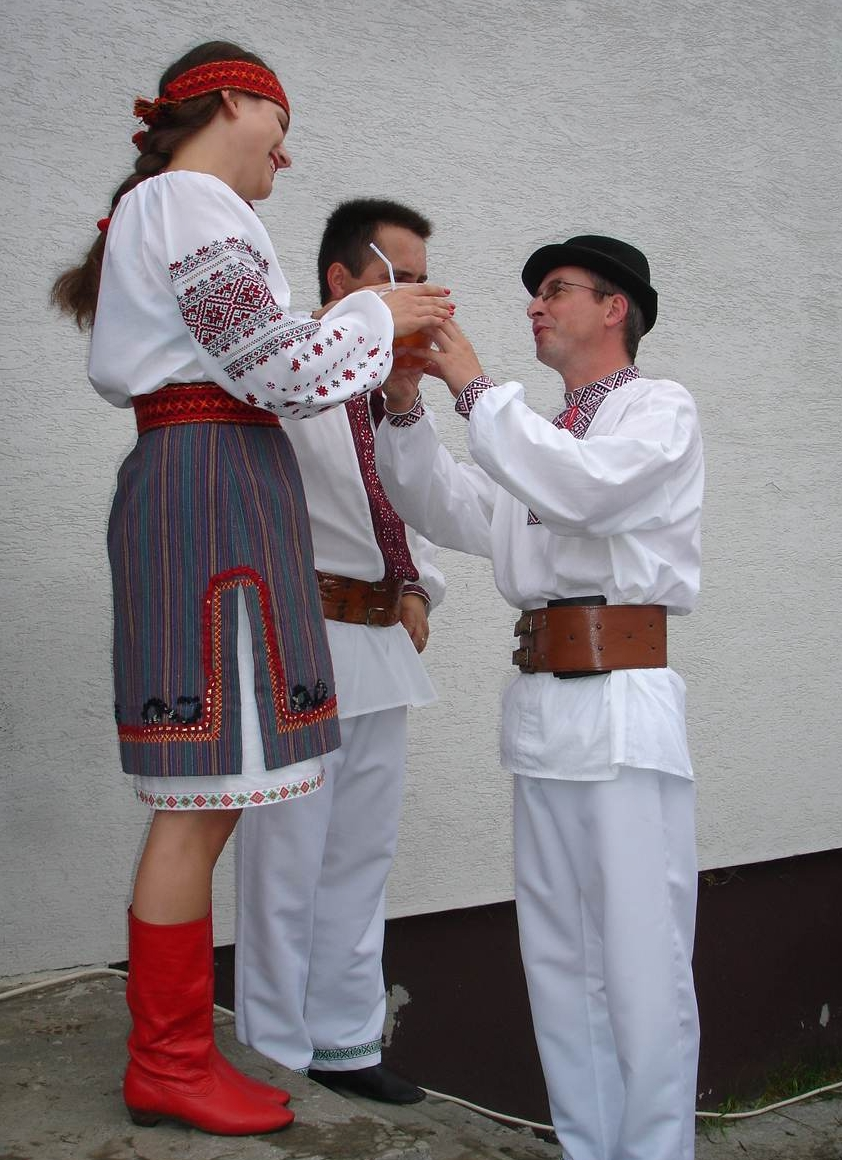
Lemkos in folk costumes from Mokre, near Sanok

One of the first known Slavic tribes to inhabit what would later become known as Red Ruthenia were the Lendians, a Lechitic tribe that would later form part of the Polish ethnicity and founded many of the fortified Cherven Cities in the region. They lived along the banks of the Bug river in the Pobuże (Cis-Bug) and Zabuże (Trans-Bug) regions on the western and eastern sides of the river respectively. Another Slavic tribe were the White Croats (or Chrobatians), who likely originated in what is now Volhynia but whose ethnogenesis is unclear, though their ethnonym being of Iranian-speaking Sarmatian origin indicates possible subjugations or incursions by eastern nomads. The Vistulans, another Lechitic tribe, would also gradually settle in the western part of the region, eventually joining the other related tribes to form an autochthonous Polish-speaking population.

The region would be part of Great Moravia in the 9th century before being invaded by the Magyars at the end of the century. It became a contentious prize for the Kievan Rus', owing to prior settlement of its eastern portions by East Slavic tribes, most of whom would become known in the coming centuries as the Ruthenians. Consequently, it was captured by Vladimir the Great in the late 10th century. In 1018 parts of Red Ruthenia would become part of the newly established Polish kingdom before again falling to Rus' in 1031. The region would thereafter change hands consistently between Poland and Rus' and its successor kingdoms and duchies (such as the Principality of Peremyshl and later the Kingdom of Galicia–Volhynia) across the centuries, endure a Mongol invasion and suzerainty, with only the Galicia–Volhynia Wars ultimately securing it as an integral part of Casimir the Great's Poland.

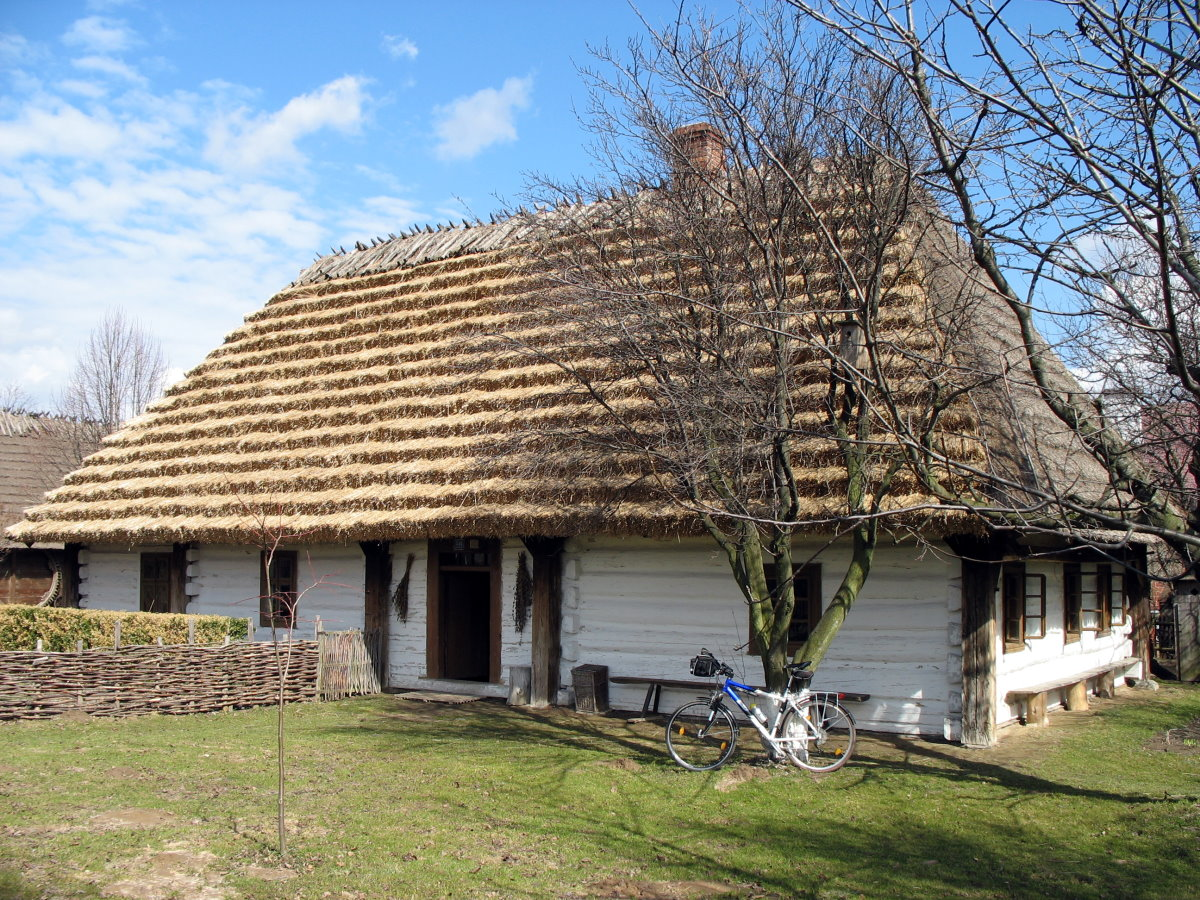
Village of Markowa, about 150-200 km southeast of Kraków. Its 18th- and 19th-century Upper Lusatian houses evoked the mountains of Saxony.

According to Marcin Bielski, although Bolesław I Chrobry settled Germans in the region to defend the borders against Hungary and Kievan Rus' the settlers became farmers. Maciej Stryjkowski described German peasants near Rzeszów, Przemyśl, Sanok, and Jarosław as good farmers. Casimir the Great settled German citizens on the borders of Lesser Poland and Red Ruthenia to join the acquired territory with the rest of his kingdom. Furthermore, Poles from other regions of Poland would begin to settle in the area alongside the already existing autochthonous Polish populations. In determining the population of late medieval Poland, colonisation and Polish migration to Red Ruthenia, Spiš and Podlachia (whom the Ruthenians called Mazury—poor peasant migrants, chiefly from Mazowsze) should be considered.

During the second half of the 14th century, the Vlachs arrived from the southeastern Carpathians and quickly settled across Red Ruthenia, especially in its mountainous southern reaches. Although during the 15th century the Ruthenians gained a foothold, it was not until the 16th century that the Wallachian population in the Bieszczady Mountains and the Lower Beskids was Ruthenized, giving rise to the Rusyn ethnicity. From the 14th to the 16th centuries, Red Ruthenia underwent rapid urbanisation, resulting in over 200 new towns built on the German model (virtually unknown before 1340, when Red Ruthenia was the independent Kingdom of Halych). At this time, a new wave of German settlers known as Walddeutsche ("Forest Germans"), as well as minorities such as Jews, Armenians, Karaims, Crimean Tatars, Greeks and Vlachs also made up part of the population.

== History ==
=== 1199 to 1772 ===
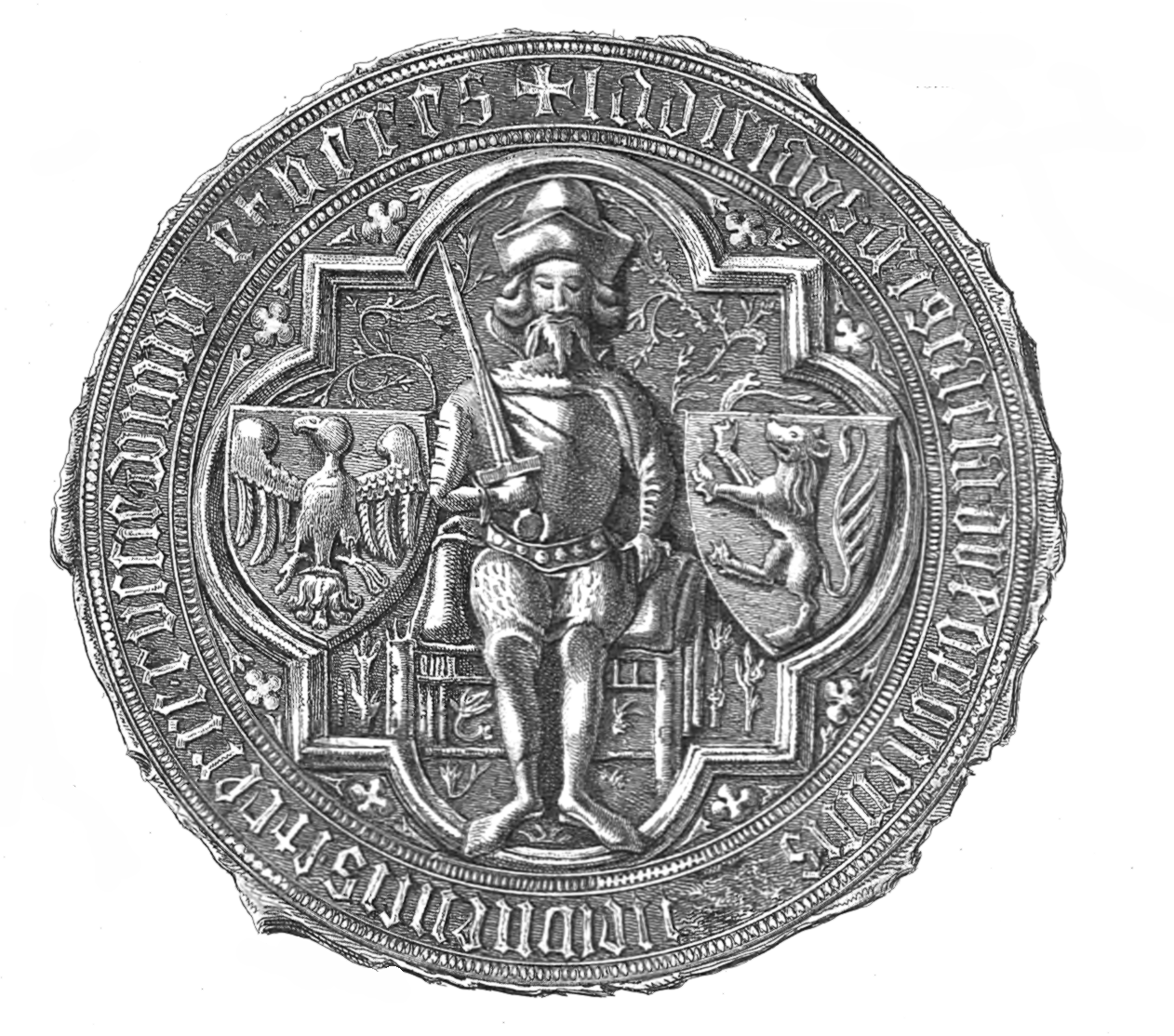
The ducal seal of Vladislaus II of Opole (Władysław Opolczyk): "Ladislaus Dei Gracia Dux Opoliensis Wieloniensis et Terre Russie Domin et Heres" (c. 1387)

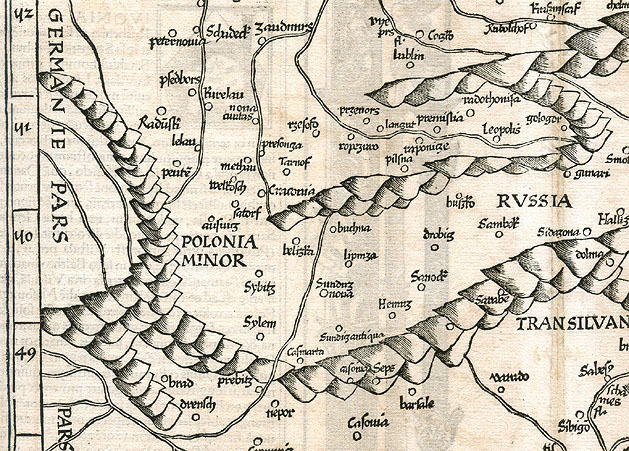
The 1507 Lesser Poland and Red Ruthenia Map (Polonia Minor; Russia) by Martin Waldseemüller

During the early Middle Ages, the region was part of Kievan Rus' and, from 1199, the independent Kingdom of Galicia–Volhynia.

In 1340, the Romanovichi house of princes of Galicia and Volhynia died out, causing the Galicia–Volhynia Wars (1340–1392). Casimir the Great of Poland managed to take control of Galicia in 1340, while the Grand Duchy of Lithuania obtained Volhynia. During his reign from 1333 to 1370, Casimir the Great founded several cities, urbanizing the rural province. Under Polish rule, 325 towns were founded from the 14th century to the second half of the 17th century, most during the 15th and 16th centuries (96 and 153, respectively).

In October 1372, Władysław Opolczyk was deposed as count palatine. Although he retained most of his castles and goods in Hungary, his political influence waned. As compensation, Opolczyk was made governor of Hungarian Galicia. In this new position, he contributed to the economic development of the territories entrusted to him. Although Opolczyk primarily resided in Lwów, at the end of his rule he spent more time in Halicz. The only serious conflict during his time as governor involved his approach to the Eastern Orthodox Church, which angered the local Catholic boyars.

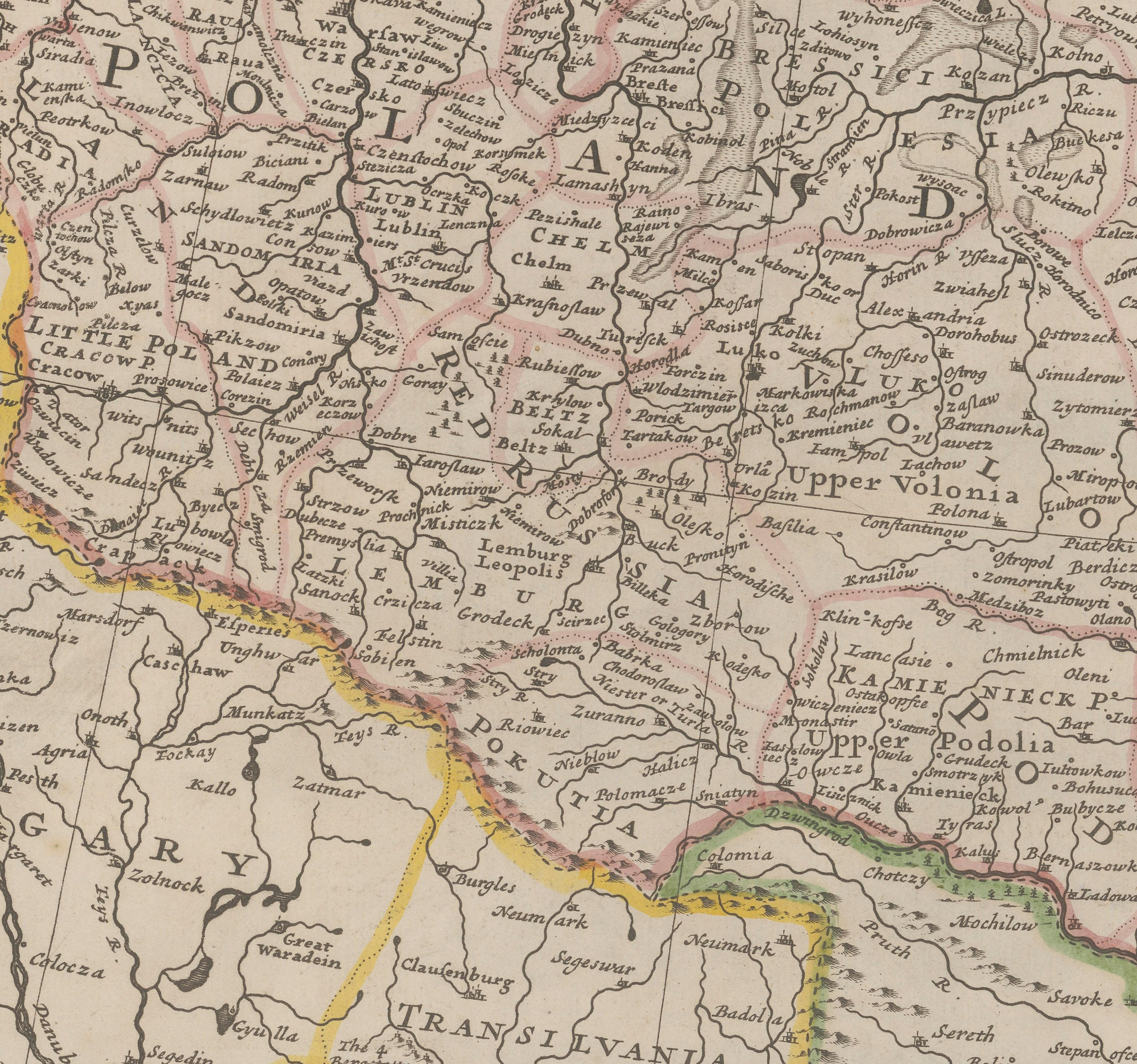
Region of Red Ruthenia at the beginning of XVIII c. - map by Herman Moll

The Polish name Ruś Czerwona (translated as "Red Rus") came into use for the territory extending to the Dniester, centring on Przemyśl. The Polish region was divided into a number of voivodeships, and an era of German eastward migration and Polish settlement among the Ruthenians began. Armenians and Jews also migrated to the region. A number of castles were built at this time, and in the 17th century the cities of Stanisławów (Stanyslaviv in Ukrainian, now Ivano-Frankivsk) and Krystynopol (now Sheptytskyi) were founded. Red Ruthenia consisted of three voivodeships: Ruthenia, whose capital was Lviv and provinces were Lviv, Halych, Sanok, Przemyśl and Chełm; Bełz, separating the provinces of Lviv and Przemyśl from the rest of the Ruthenian voivodeship; and Podolia, with its capital at Kamieniec Podolski. Since the reign of Władysław Jagiełło (d. 1434) the Przemyśl Voivodeship was called the Ruthenian Voivodeship (województwo ruskie), centring on Lwów. The Ruthenian Voivodeship consisted of five regions: Lwów, Sanok, Halicz (Halych), Przemyśl, and Chełm. The town of Halych gave its name to Galicia.

Ruthenian Voivodeship

- Chełm Land (Ziemia Chełmska), Chełm
  - Chełm County, (Powiat Chełmski), Chełm
  - Powiat of Ratno, (Powiat Ratneński), Ratno
- Halych Land (Ziemia Halicka), Halicz
  - Powiat of Halicz, (Powiat Halicki), Halicz
  - Kolomyja County, (Powiat Kołomyjski), Kołomyja
  - Trembowla County, (Powiat Trembowelski), Trembowla
- Lwów Land (Ziemia Lwowska), Lwów
  - Powiat of Lwów, (Powiat Lwowski), Lwów
  - Powiat of Żydaczów, (Powiat Żydaczowski), Żydaczów
- Przemyśl Land (Ziemia Przemyska), Przemyśl; Its area was 12,000 km^{2}. and in the 17th century it was divided five smaller regions (county, powiaty).
  - Przemyśl County (Powiat Przemyski), Przemyśl
  - Powiat of Sambor, (Powiat Samborski), Sambor
  - Powiat of Drohobycz, (Powiat Drohobycki), Drohobycz
  - Powiat of Stryj, (Powiat Stryjski), Stryj
- Sanok Land (Ziemia Sanocka), Sanok
  - Sanok County (Powiat Sanocki), Sanok: Intensive settlement occurred from the 13th to 15th centuries in an area flanked by the Wisłok, San and Wisłoka Rivers. The Vlachs primarily engaged in agriculture; moving west, they established a number of villages during the 15th century. In Sanok Land were six Jewish communities, with synagogues and kahal organizations. Sixteenth- and seventeenth-century Jewish Communities were also autonomous in criminal law.

Bełz Voivodeship

- Belz County, (Powiat Bełzski), Bełz
- Grabowiec County, (Powiat Grabowiecki), Grabowiec
- Horodło County, (Powiat Horodelski), Horodło
- Lubaczów County, (Powiat Lubaczowski), Lubaczów
- Busk Land, (Ziemia Buska), Busk

Ruthenia was subject to repeated Tatar and Ottoman Empire incursions during the 16th and 17th centuries and was impacted by the Khmelnytsky Uprising (1648–1654), the 1654–1667 Russo-Polish War and Swedish invasions during the Deluge (1655–1660); the Swedes returned during the Great Northern War of the early 18th century.

=== 1772 to 1918 ===
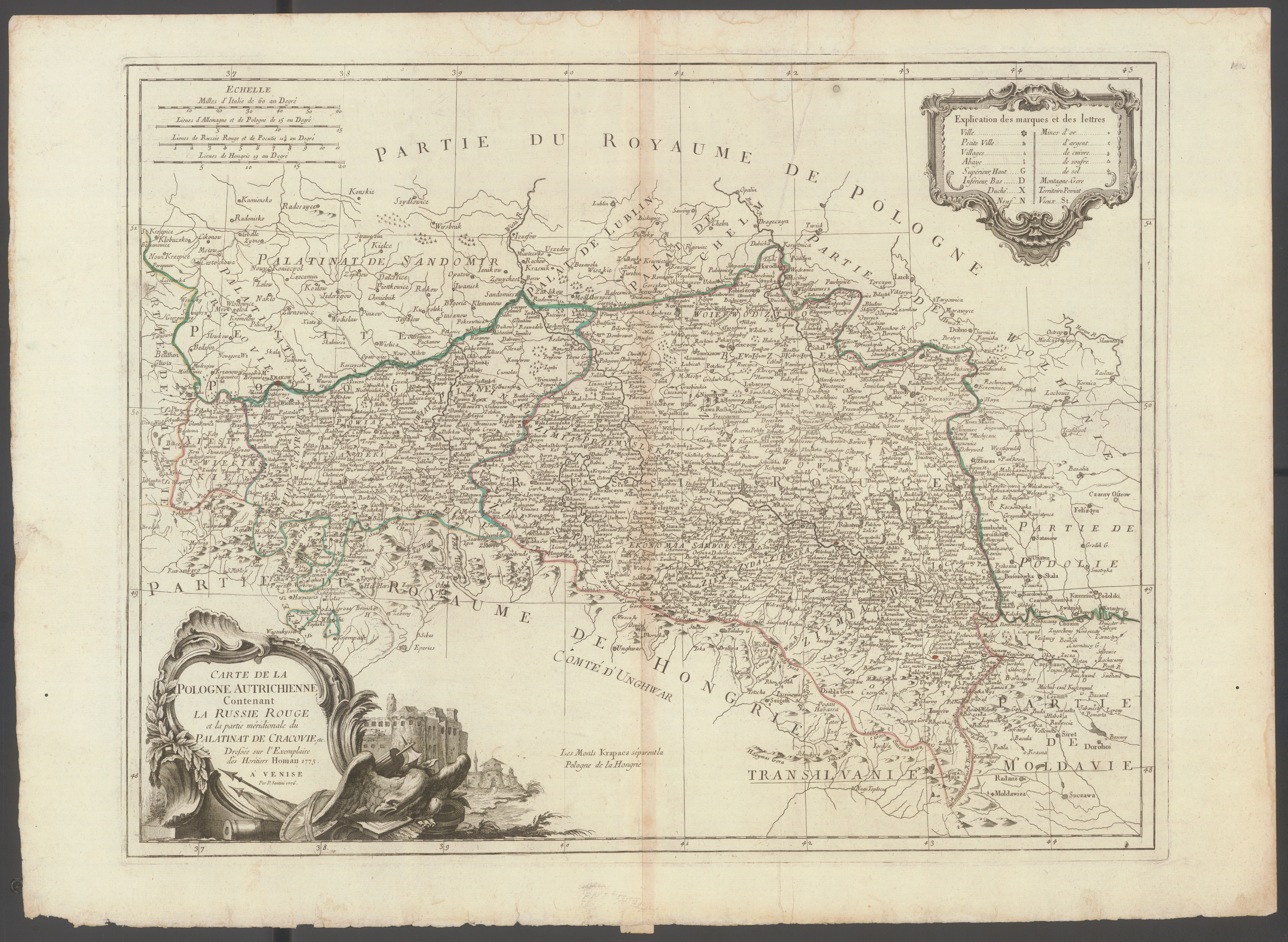
Map of Red Russia (La Russie Rouge) and the southern part of the Krakow Palatinate after First Partition of Poland (Map of 1775)

Red Ruthenia (except for Podolia) was conquered by the Austrian Empire in 1772 during the First Partition of Poland, remaining part of the empire until 1918. Between World Wars I and II, it belonged to the Second Polish Republic. The region is currently split, with its western portion in southeastern Poland (around Rzeszów, Przemyśl, Zamość and Chełm) and its eastern portion (around Lviv) in western Ukraine.

== Largest cities ==
	City	Population (2022)	Country	Administrative
1	Lviv	717,273	(Ukraine)	Lviv Oblast
2	Ivano-Frankivsk	238,196	(Ukraine)	Ivano-Frankivsk Oblast
3	Ternopil	225,004	(Ukraine)	Ternopil Oblast
4	Rzeszów	198,609	(Poland)	Subcarpathian Voivodeship
5	Drohobych	73,682	(Ukraine)	Lviv Oblast
6	Kalush	65,088	(Ukraine)	Ivano-Frankivsk Oblast
7	Sheptytskyi	64,297	(Ukraine)	Lviv Oblast
8	Kolomyia	60,821	(Ukraine)	Ivano-Frankivsk Oblast
9	Stryi	59,425	(Ukraine)	Lviv Oblast
10	Zamość	58,942	(Poland)	Lublin Voivodeship
11	Chełm	57,933	(Poland)	Lublin Voivodeship
12	Przemyśl	57,568	(Poland)	Subcarpathian Voivodeship
13	Krosno	44,322	(Poland)	Subcarpathian Voivodeship
14	Jarosław	35,945	(Poland)	Subcarpathian Voivodeship
15	Sanok	34,687	(Poland)	Subcarpathian Voivodeship
16	Sambir	34,152	(Ukraine)	Lviv Oblast
17	Boryslav	32,473	(Ukraine)	Lviv Oblast
18	Novoiavorivsk	31,366	(Ukraine)	Lviv Oblast
19	Truskavets	28,287	(Ukraine)	Lviv Oblast
20	Chortkiv	28,279	(Ukraine)	Ternopil Oblast

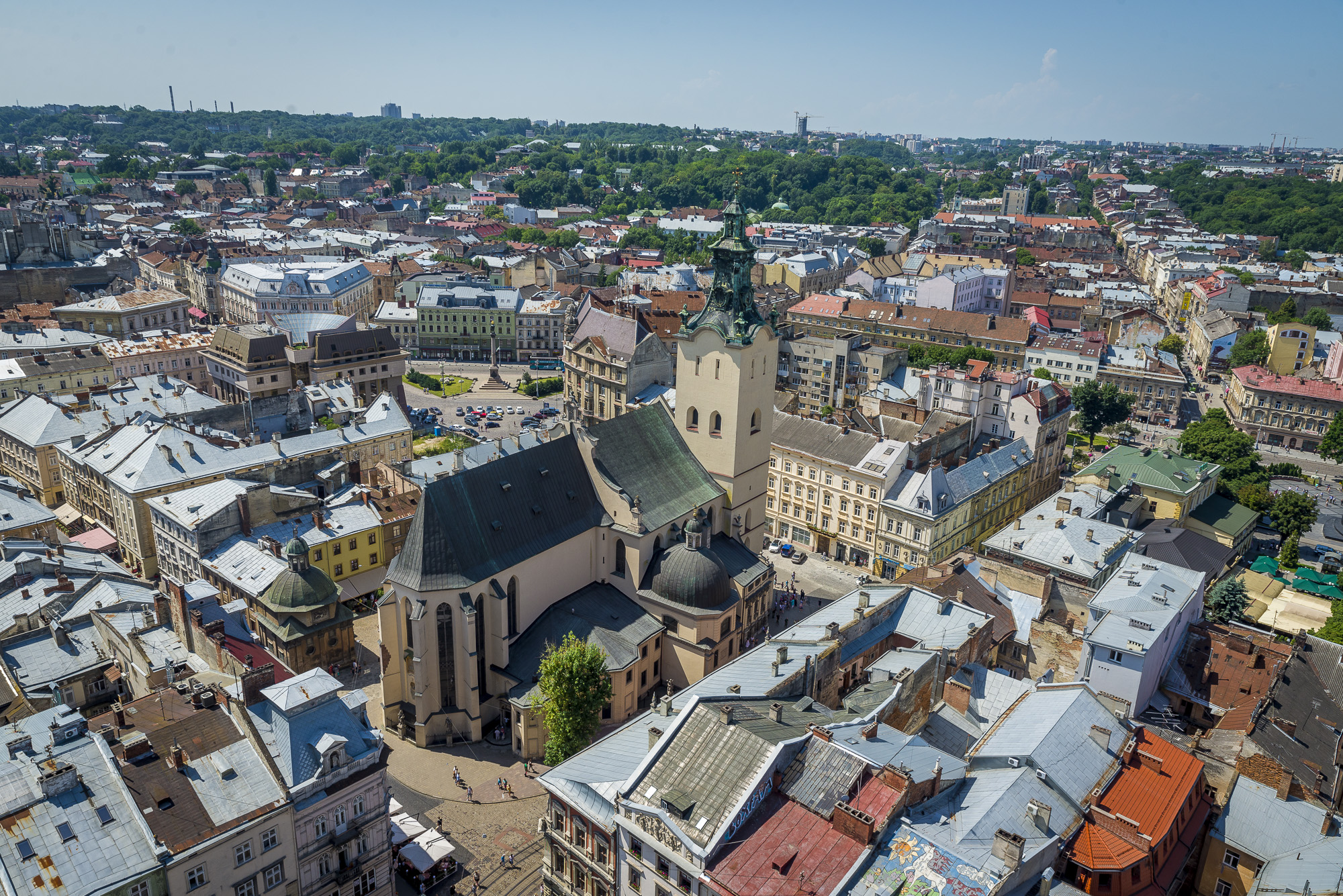
Lviv

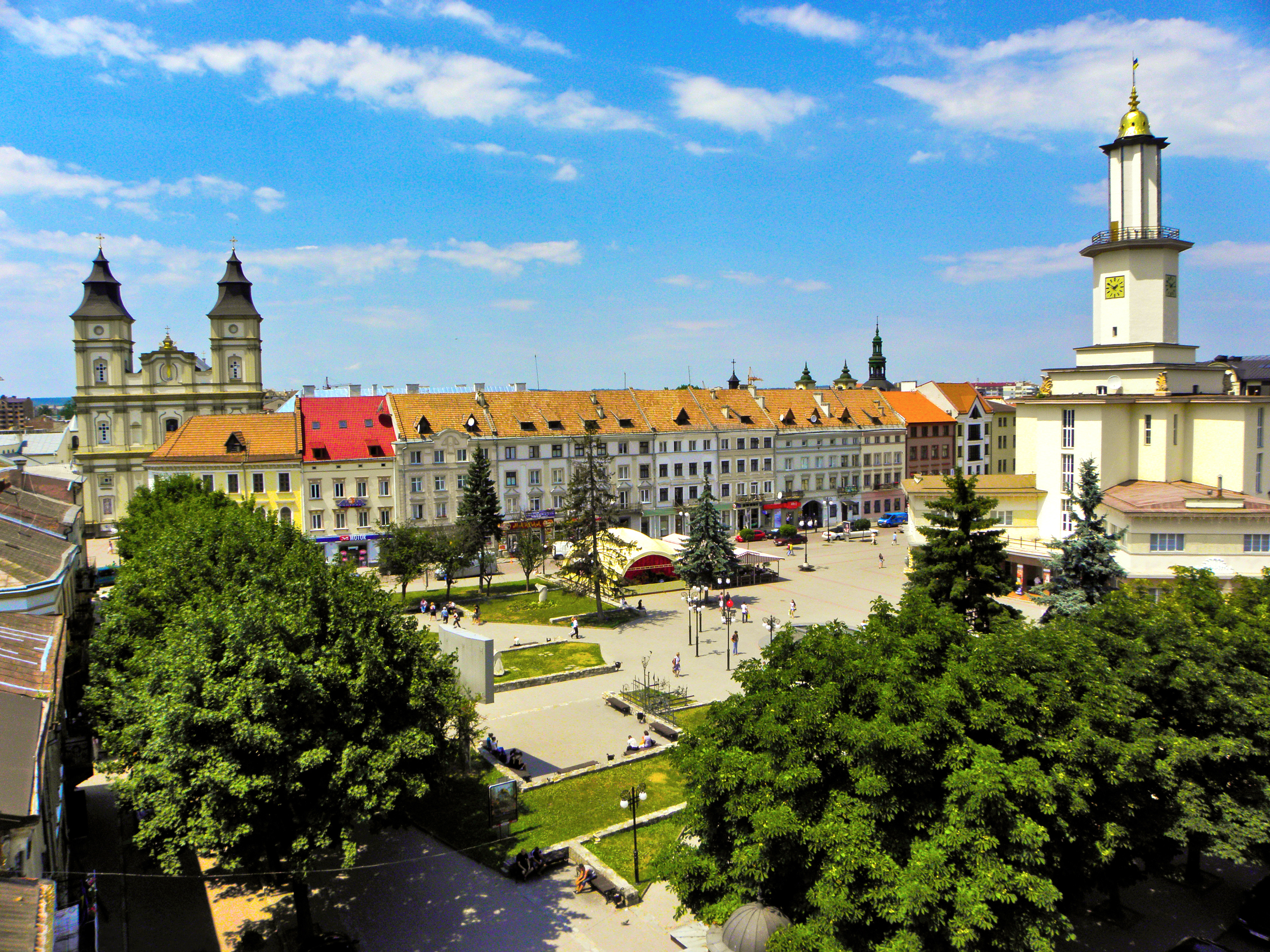
Ivano-Frankivsk

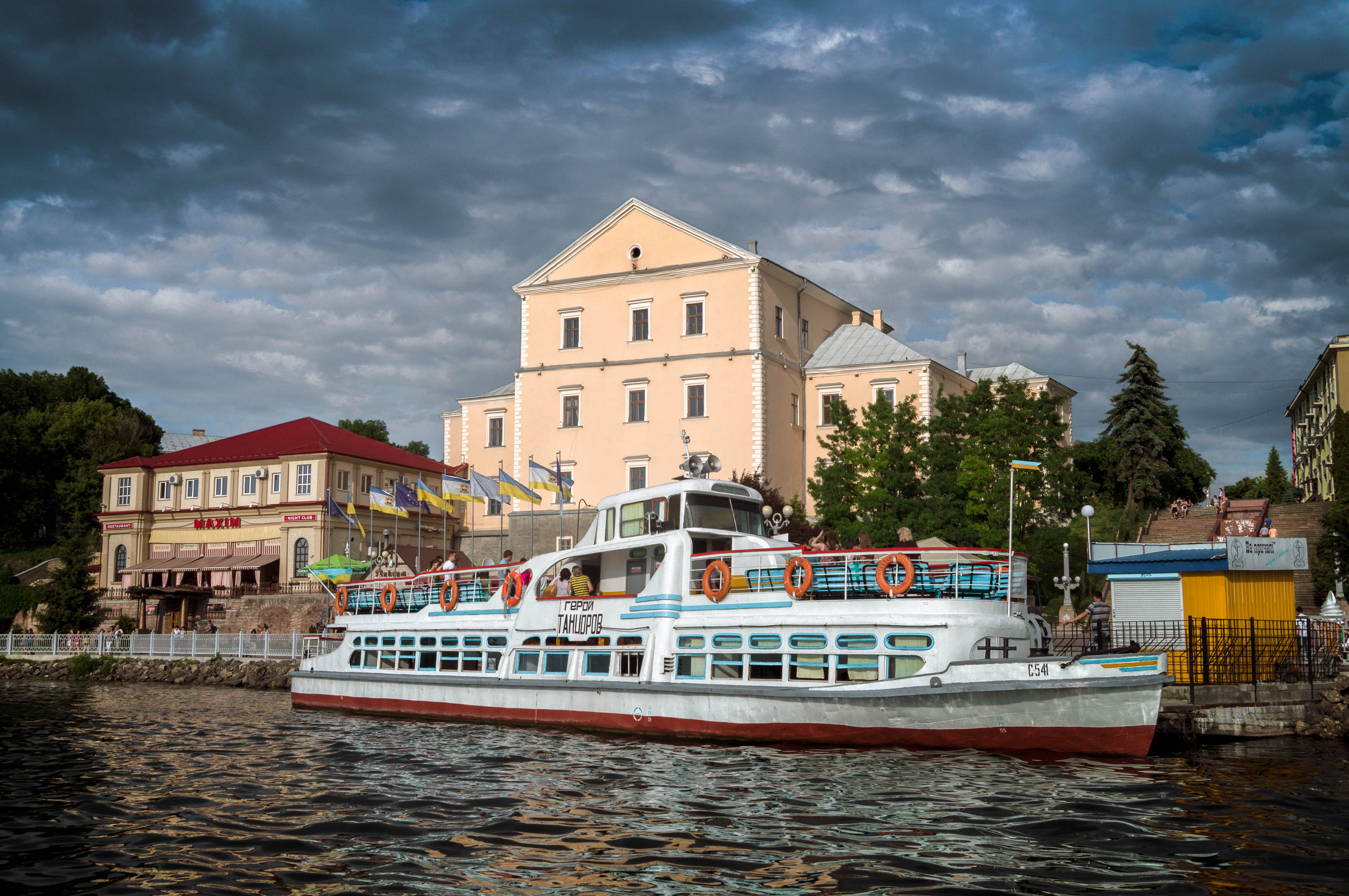
Ternopil

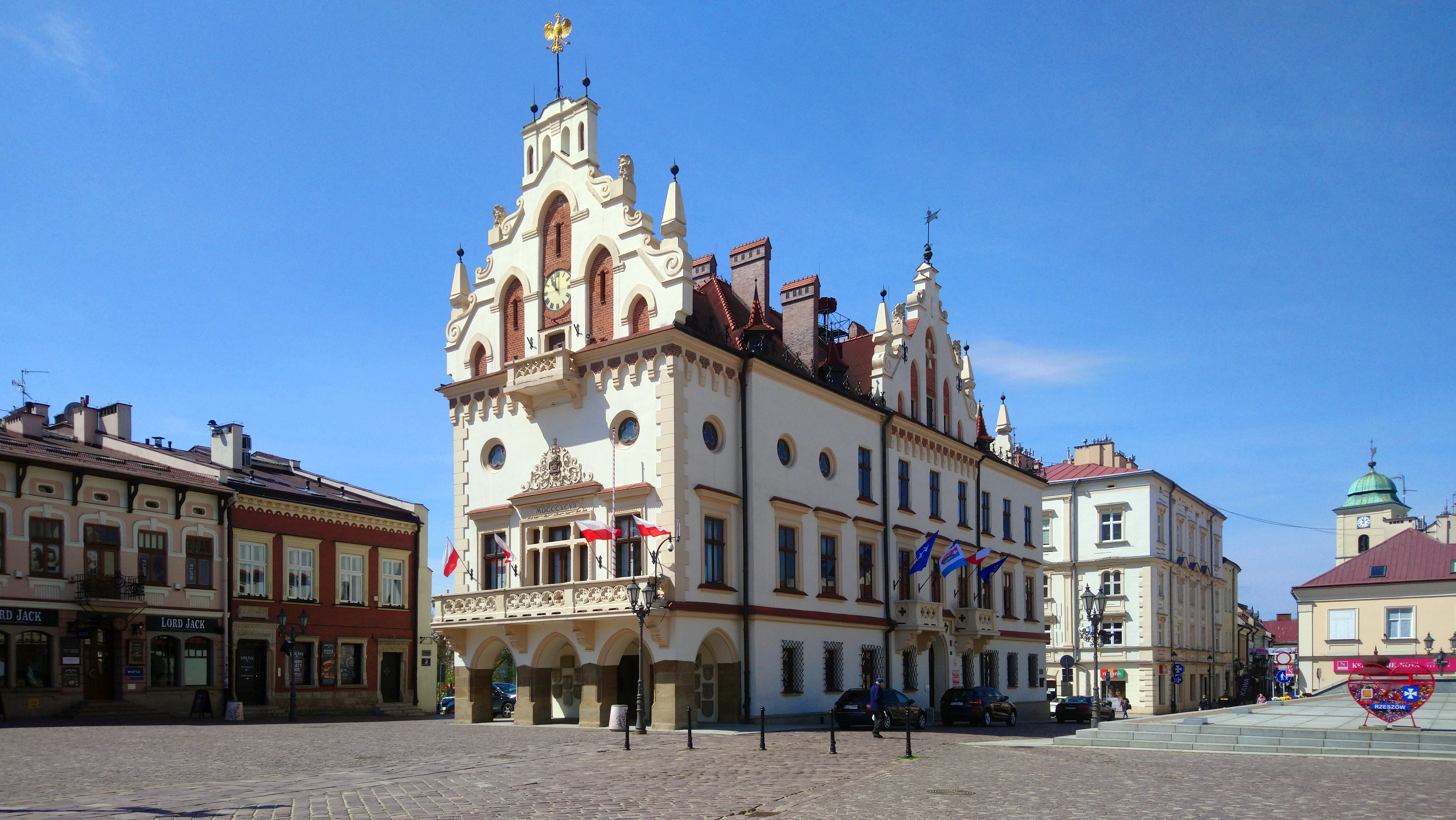
Rzeszów

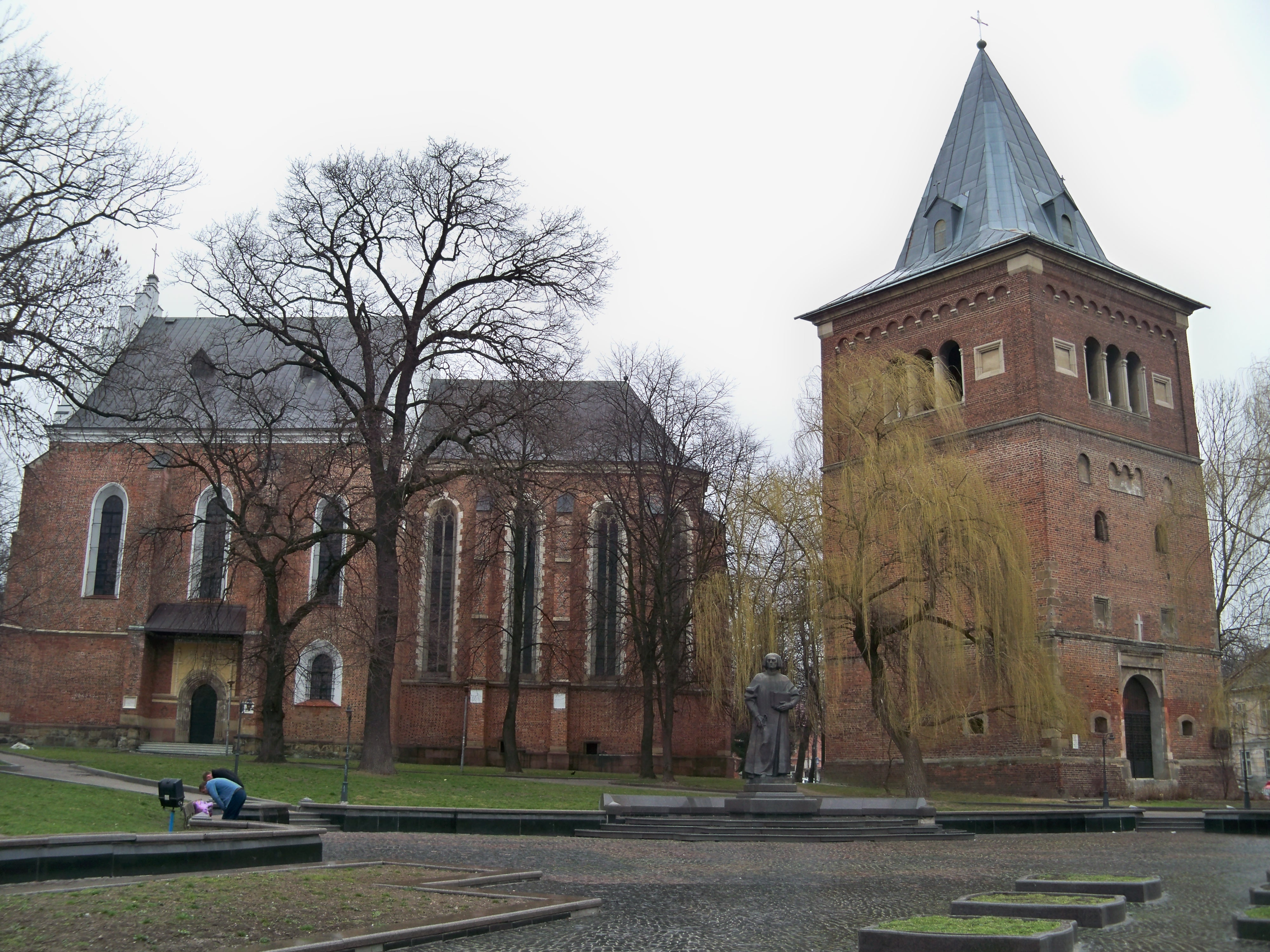
Drohobych

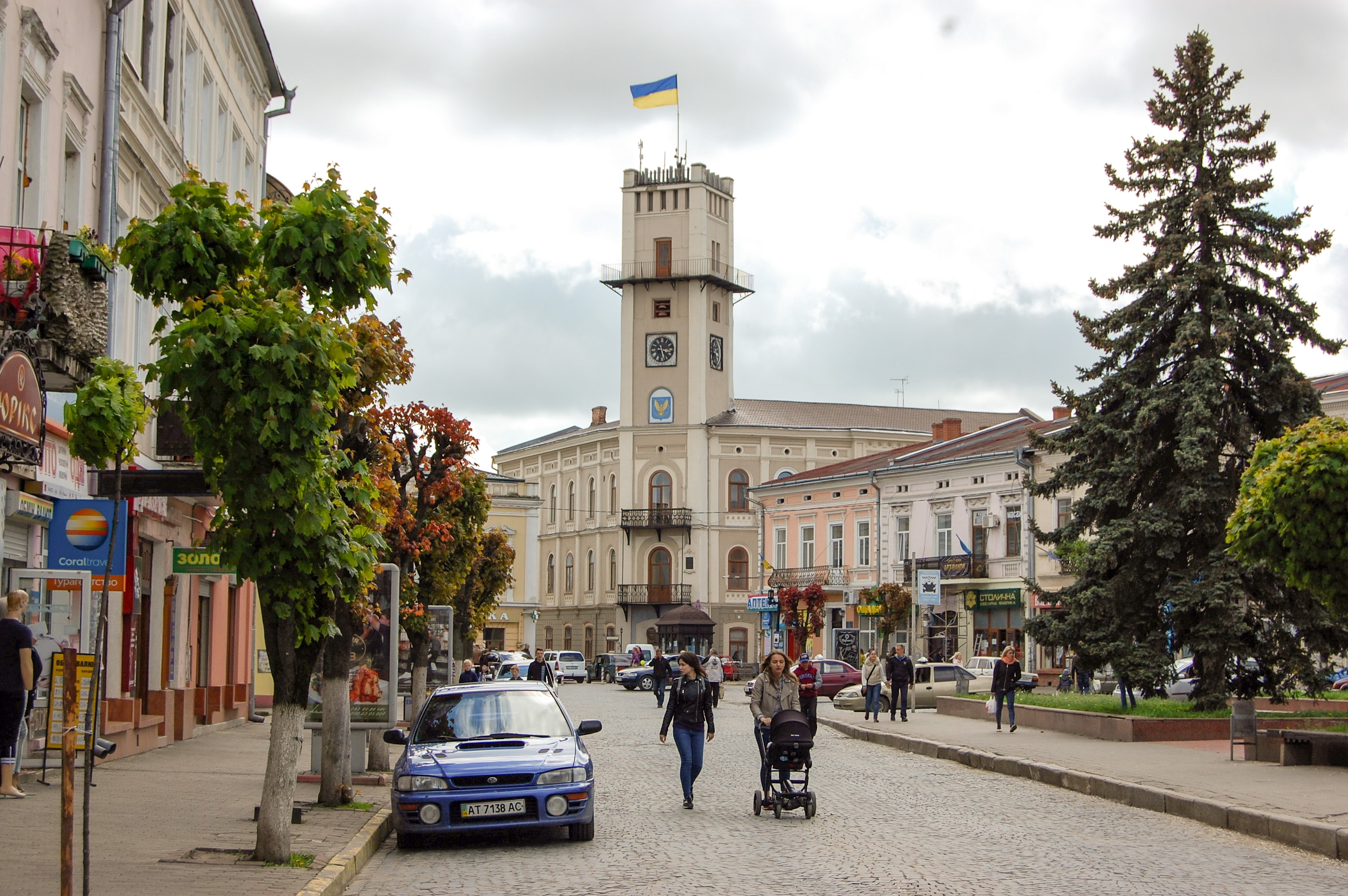
Kolomyia

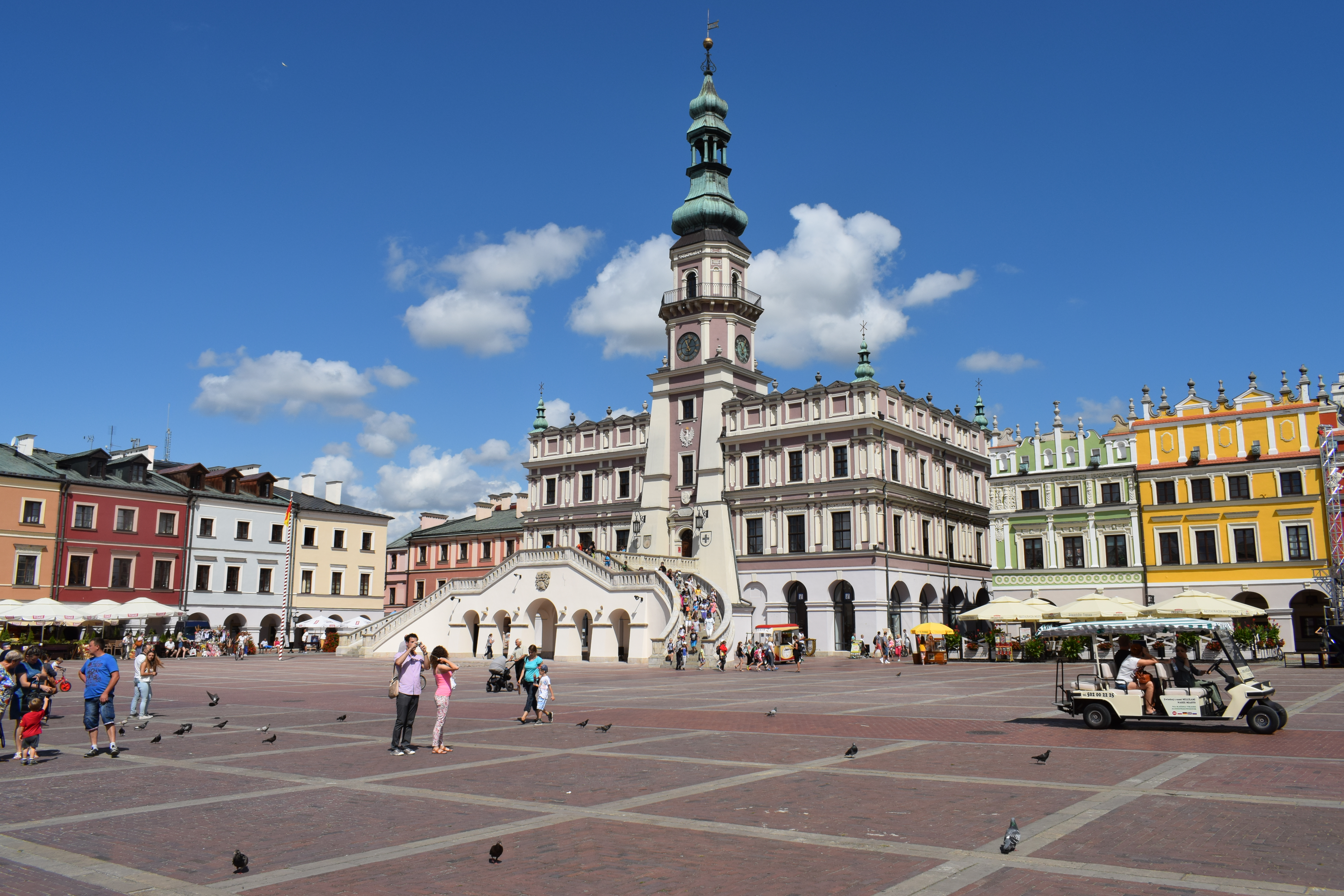
Zamość

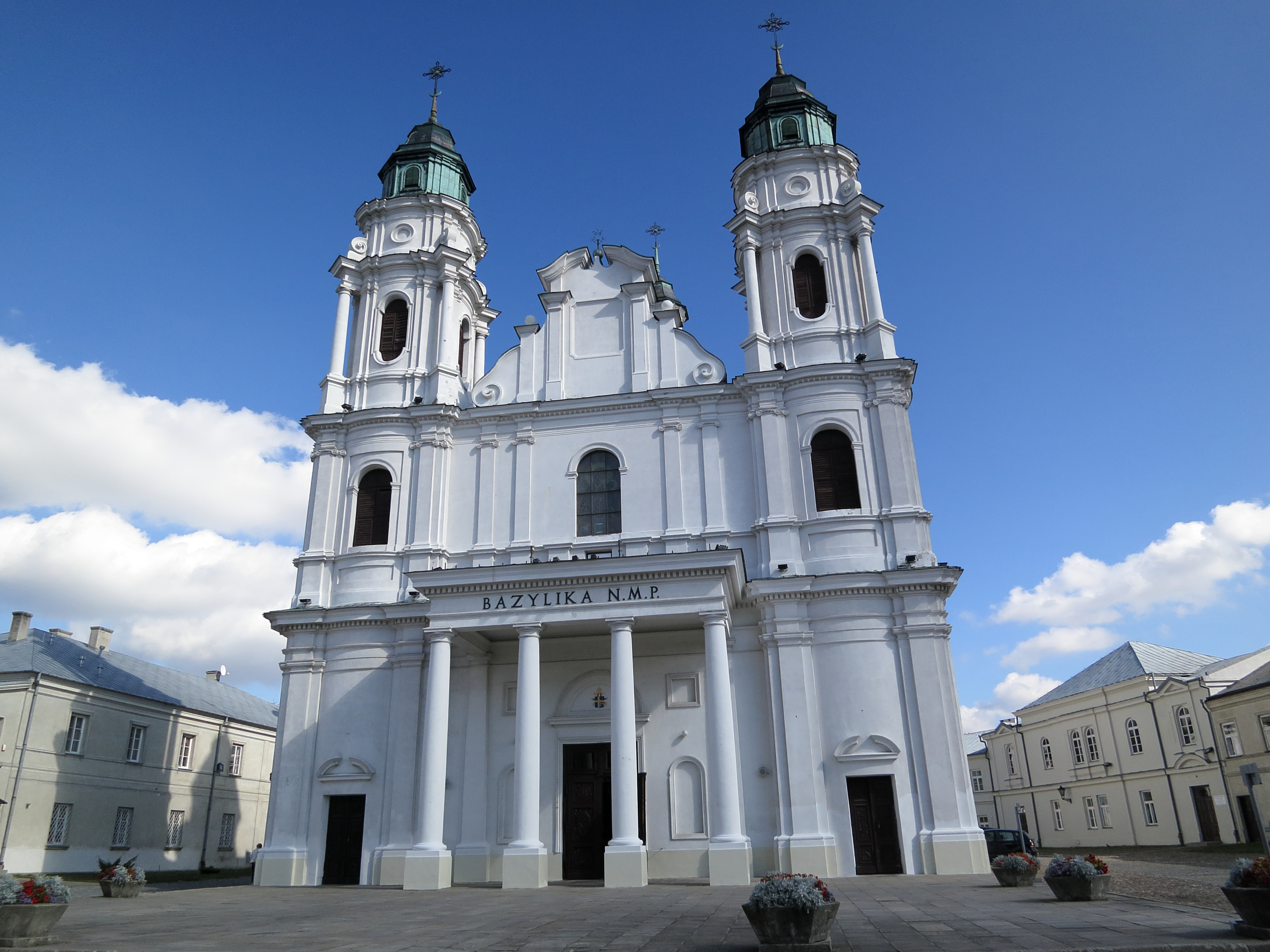
Chełm

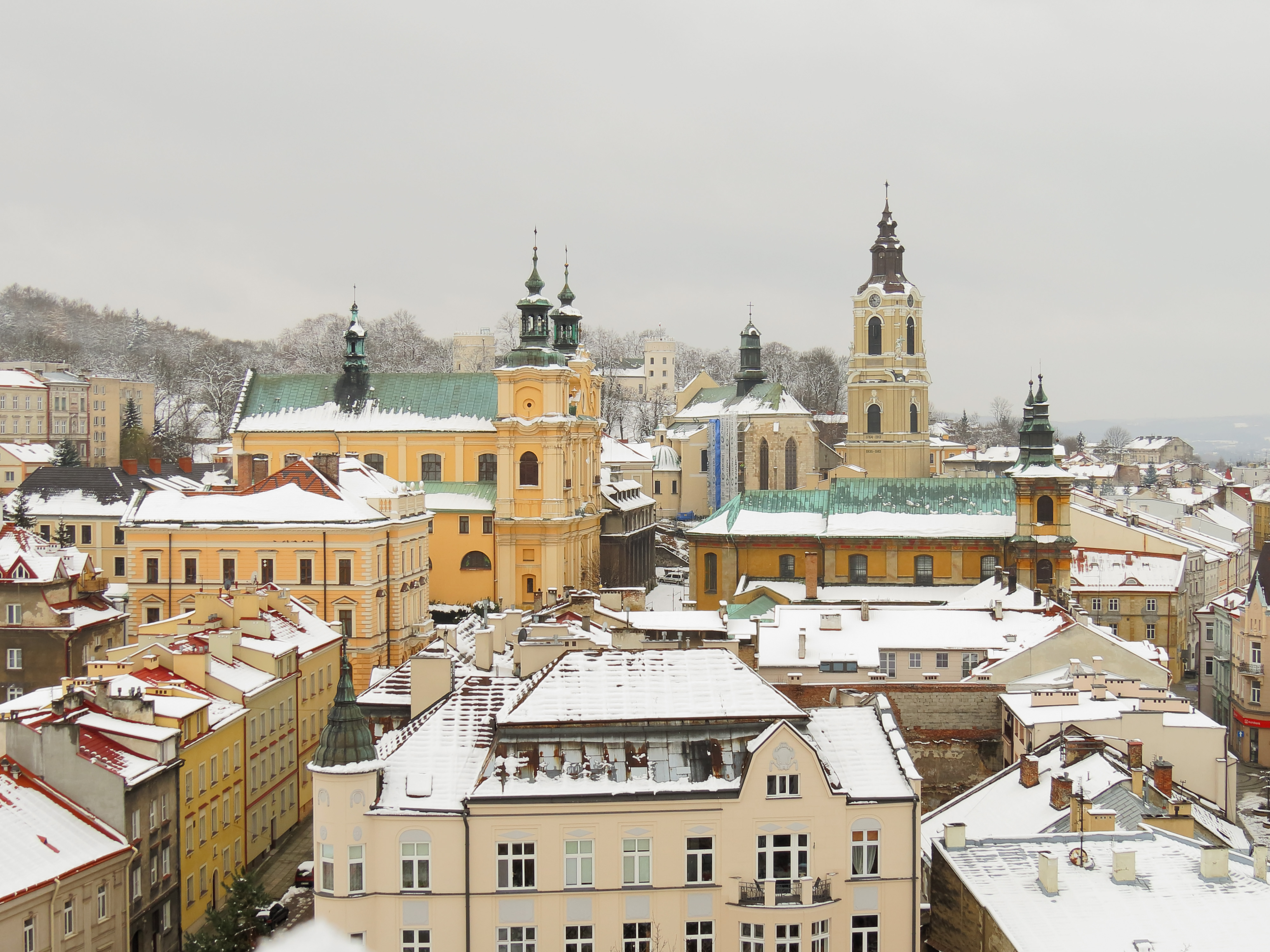
Przemyśl

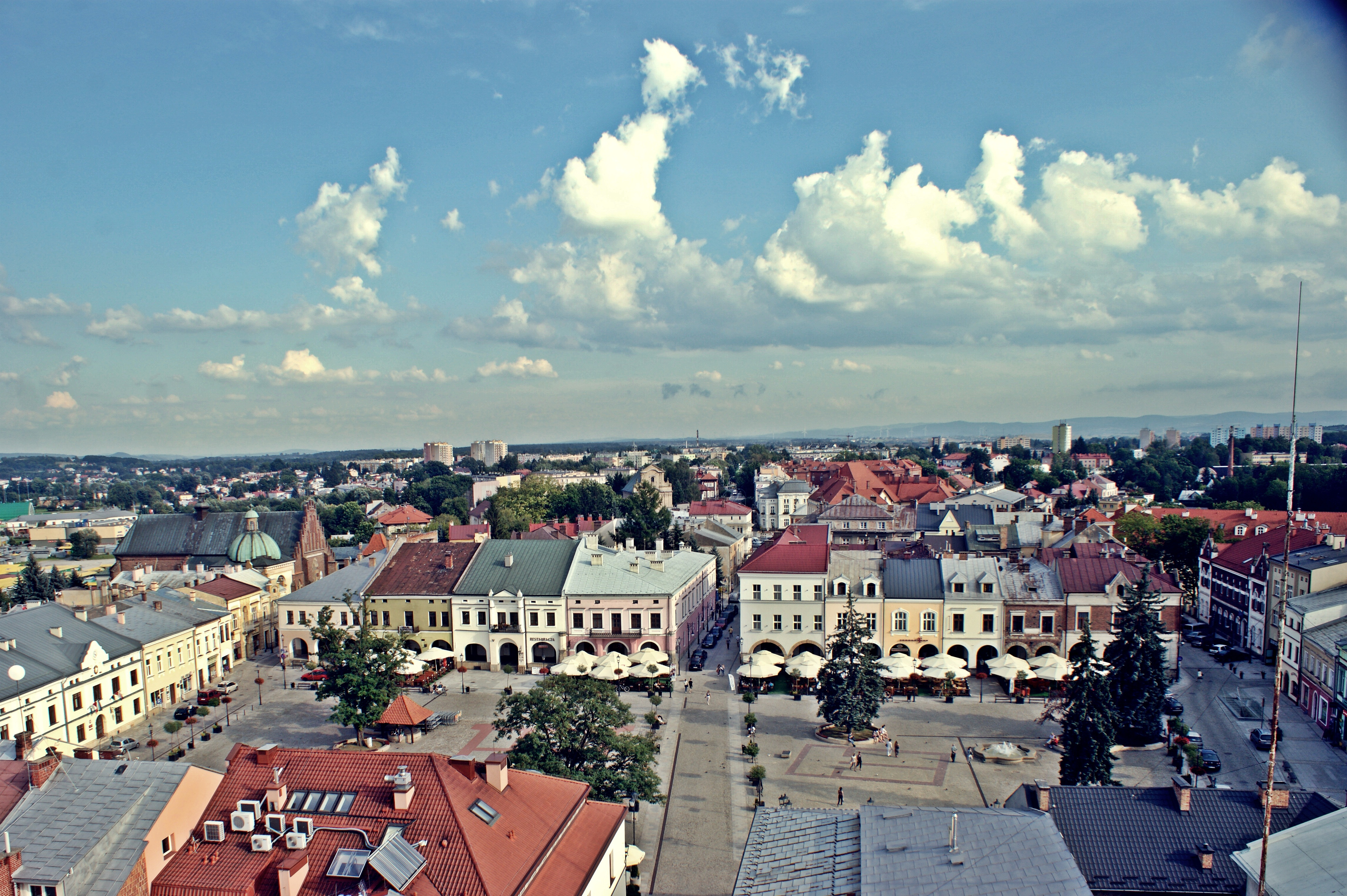
Krosno

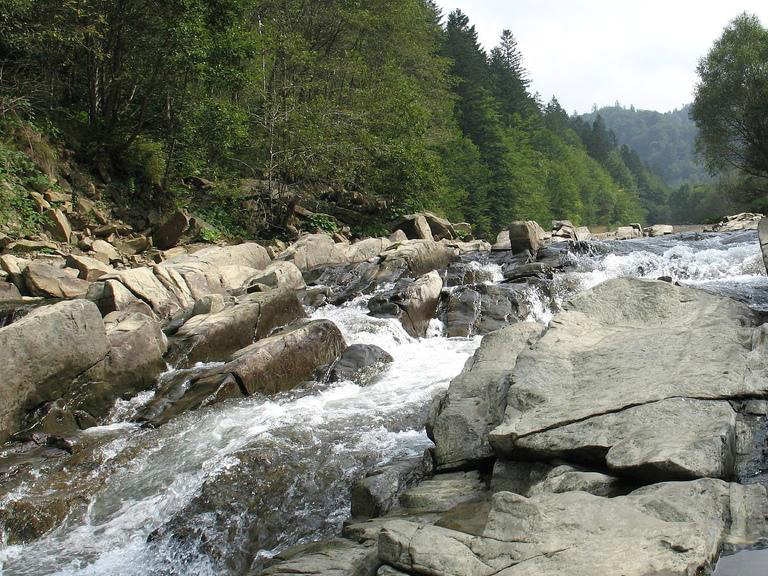
Bieszczady Mountains

== See also ==
- Ruthenia
- White Ruthenia
- Black Ruthenia
- Cherven Cities
- Ivano-Frankivsk Oblast
- Stanisławów Voivodeship
- Eastern Galicia
- District of Galicia
- Lwów Voivodeship
- Ruthenian Voivodeship

== Sources ==
- "Monumenta Poloniae Historica"
- Akta grodzkie i ziemskie z archiwum ziemskiego. Lauda sejmikowe. Tom XXIII, XXIV, XXV.
- Słownik geograficzny Królestwa Polskiego (Digital edition)
- Lustracja województwa ruskiego, podolskiego i bełskiego, 1564-1565 Warszawa, (I) edition 2001, pages 289. ISBN 83-7181-193-4
- Lustracje dóbr królewskich XVI-XVIII wieku. Lustracja województwa ruskiego 1661—1665. Część III ziemie halicka i chełmska. Polska Akademia Nauk - Instytut Historii. 1976
- Lustracje województw ruskiego, podolskiego i bełskiego 1564 - 1565, wyd. K. Chłapowski, H. Żytkowicz, cz. 1, Warszawa - Łódź 1992
- Lustracja województwa ruskiego 1661-1665, cz. 1: Ziemia przemyska i sanocka, wyd. K. Arłamowski i W. Kaput, Wrocław-Warszawa-Kraków. 1970
- Aleksander Jabłonowski. Polska wieku XVI, t. VII, Ruś Czerwona, Warszawa 1901 i 1903.
