= Chełm Land =

Historic region of Poland

Coordinates: 51°08′11″N 23°28′30″E

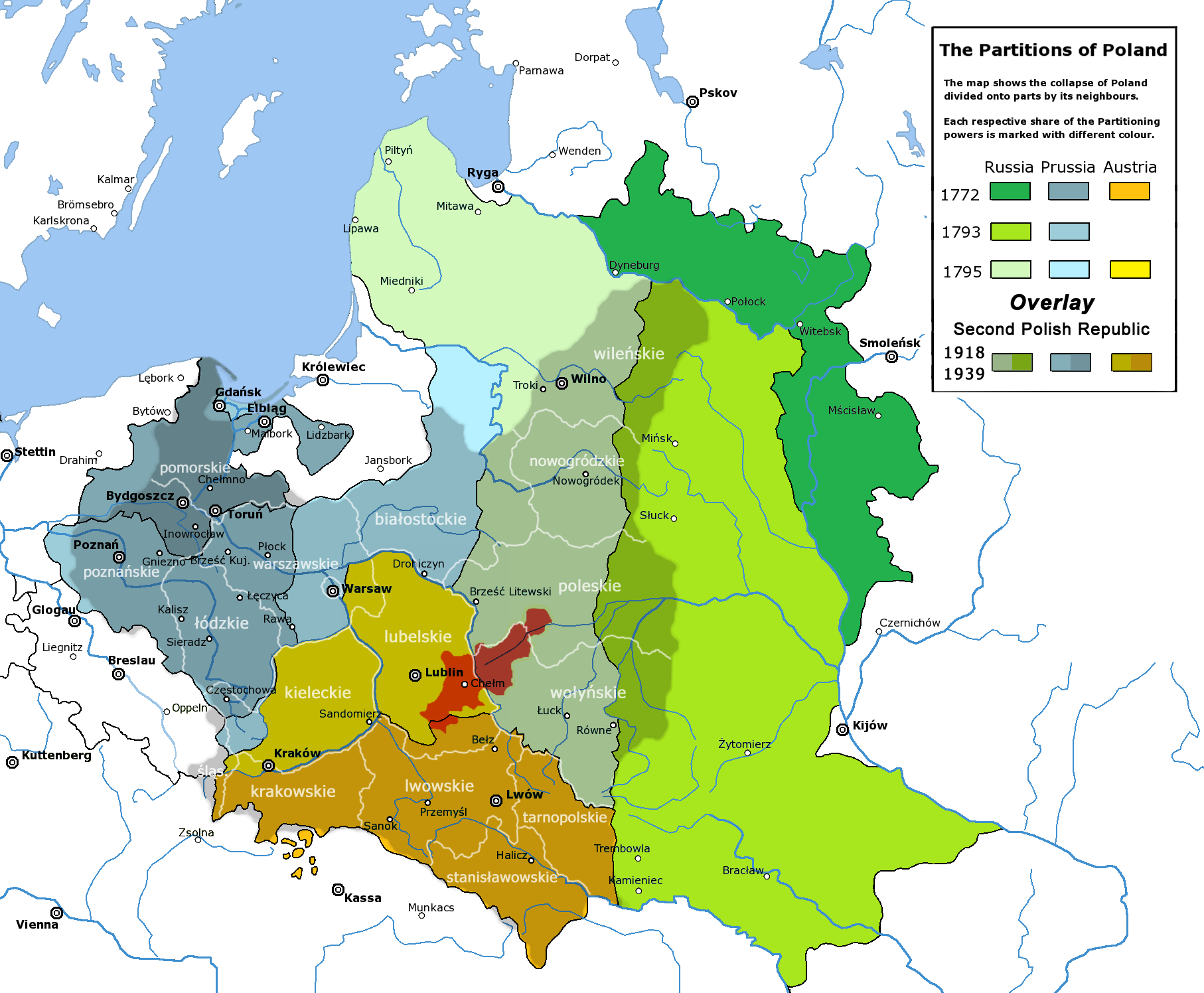
Chelm Land (burgundy) on the map of evolving Poland, 1619–1939. Base map, the Partitions of Poland by Russia, Prussia, and Austria. Overlay, borders and districts of the Second Polish Republic before the Nazi-Soviet invasion of Poland in 1939.

Chełm Land (Note: Also known as Kholmshchyna (Polish: ziemia chełmska or Chełmszczyzna, Ukrainian: Холмщина Kholmshchyna)) was a region of the Kingdom of Poland and later of the Polish–Lithuanian Commonwealth (1569–1795). Today, the region is situated in the modern states of Poland, Ukraine, and Belarus. As an exclave of the Ruthenian Voivodeship, it was separated from the main part of the voivodeship by the voivodeship of Bełz. The region's most important town was Chełm. In the Commonwealth, Chełm Land enjoyed a special status; some documents described it as a separate entity - Chełm Voivodeship (Latin: Palatinatus Chelmensis).

== History ==
In 981 AD, the territory was conquered by the ruler of Kievan Rus', Vladimir the Great. At that time, it was inhabited by West Slavs (Lendians), according to Polish historian Ryszard Orłowski. Vladimir brought Ruthenian settlers to the region.

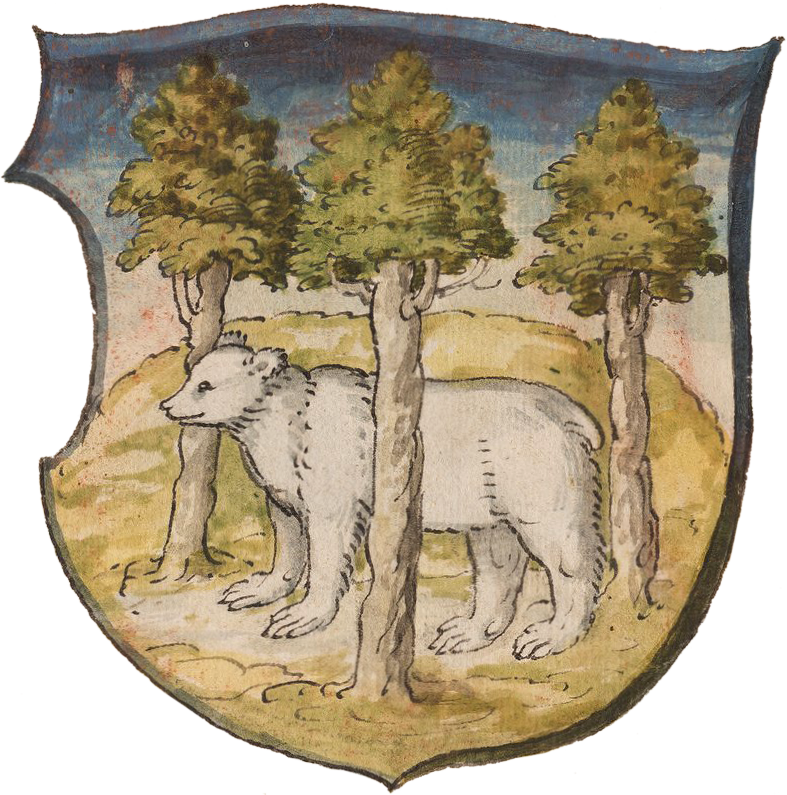
Chełm Land CoA in Recueil d'armoiries polonaises

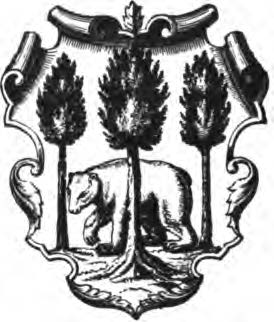
Chełm Land CoA by Kasper Niesiecki

The area of future Chełm Land was located between early Kingdom of Poland and Kievan Rus. Both states fought for it in the 10th century, and after several conflicts, in ca. 1240 King Daniel of Galicia made Chełm capital of an Orthodox Diocese, which resulted in quick development of the town. Following Mongol invasion of Rus', which weakened Ruthenian states, the Grand Duchy of Lithuania, a new power in Eastern Europe, occupied Chełm.

In 1340, the town was annexed by Polish King Kazimierz Wielki, together with Belz, Red Ruthenia and Podolia. At first, the Land of Chełm was united with the Land of Belz, but in 1387, King Wladyslaw Jagiello handed Belz as a fief to Duke of Mazovia Siemowit, while Chełm was directly annexed by the Polish Crown. Older sources claim that Chełm Land became part of Ruthenian Voivodeship at the time of its creation in 1434, but according to new research, it remained an independent unit of administration, with its own sejmik, until probably early 16th century.

At first Chełm Land consisted of Chełm County and Krasnystaw County, but in 1392 it was expanded by the area of Hrubieszow, which had previously belonged to Belz Land. Furthermore, in the 1430s, Chełm Land was expanded by vast areas east of the Bug river, the Counties of Ratno and Luboml. Altogether, its total area was some 10,000 km^{2}, remaining in the same shape until the first partition of Poland (1772).

Polish historian and ethnographer Zygmunt Gloger wrote in the 19th century that Chełm Land was an exclave of the Ruthenian Voivodeship, completely separated from it by the Belz Voivodeship. New research claims that in the area of sparsely populated Solska Forest, Belz Land might have bordered Ruthenian Voivodeship's Przemysl Land. The Bug divided Chełm Land into two unequal parts; in the smaller, sparsely populated eastern two counties, the source of the Prypec river was located, as well as several lakes and swamps of Polesie.

In the 15th century, Chełm Land was divided into the following counties: Chełm, Krasnystaw, Hrubieszow, Luboml and Ratno. In 1465, Hrubieszow County was annexed by Chełm County, and in ca. 1469, Chełm County annexed Luboml and Ratno Counties. After these changes, Chełm Land was divided into two counties: Chełm (area: 7900 km^{2}.), and Krasnystaw (area: 2000 km^{2}.). Furthermore, in southwestern corner of Krasnystaw County was a private Szczebrzeszyn County, also some parts of Chełm Land belonged to Zamoyski Family Fee Tail.

In the Polish–Lithuanian Commonwealth (1569–1795) most inhabitants of the eastern parts of Chełm Land were of Ruthenian and Polish origin while the majority of ethnic Poles lived in its western areas. Chełm Land also had Jewish, Armenian and Wallachian minorities. In the second half of the 16th century, the population of Chełm Land was app. 67,000. In 1636, the population grew to 125,000, but after the wars of the 1650s, such as Swedish invasion of Poland, the population shrank to app. 100,000. In 1667, there were 16 towns and 260 villages in Chełm County, while in Krasnystaw County there were 7 towns and 167 villages.

In 1772, the Habsburg Empire annexed southern part of Chełm Land. As a result of the first partition of Poland, almost whole Ruthenian Voivodeship became part of Austrian Galicia, and Chełm Land became an independent entity, which in 1793 was turned into Chełm Voivodeship. Following the third partition of Poland (1795) the voivodeship was divided between Austria (as part of West Galicia), and Russian Empire. This meant that Chełm Land in its original shape ceased to exist. In 1815, the entire area of the Chełm Land came under Russian rule (Russian Empire, including those areas administered by Austria in the years 1795–1807). In 1918, the entire area of the Chełm land became part of the reborn Poland, and in 1945 it was divided between Poland and the USSR. Currently, historic Chełm Land belongs to three countries – Poland (most area), Ukraine and Belarus.

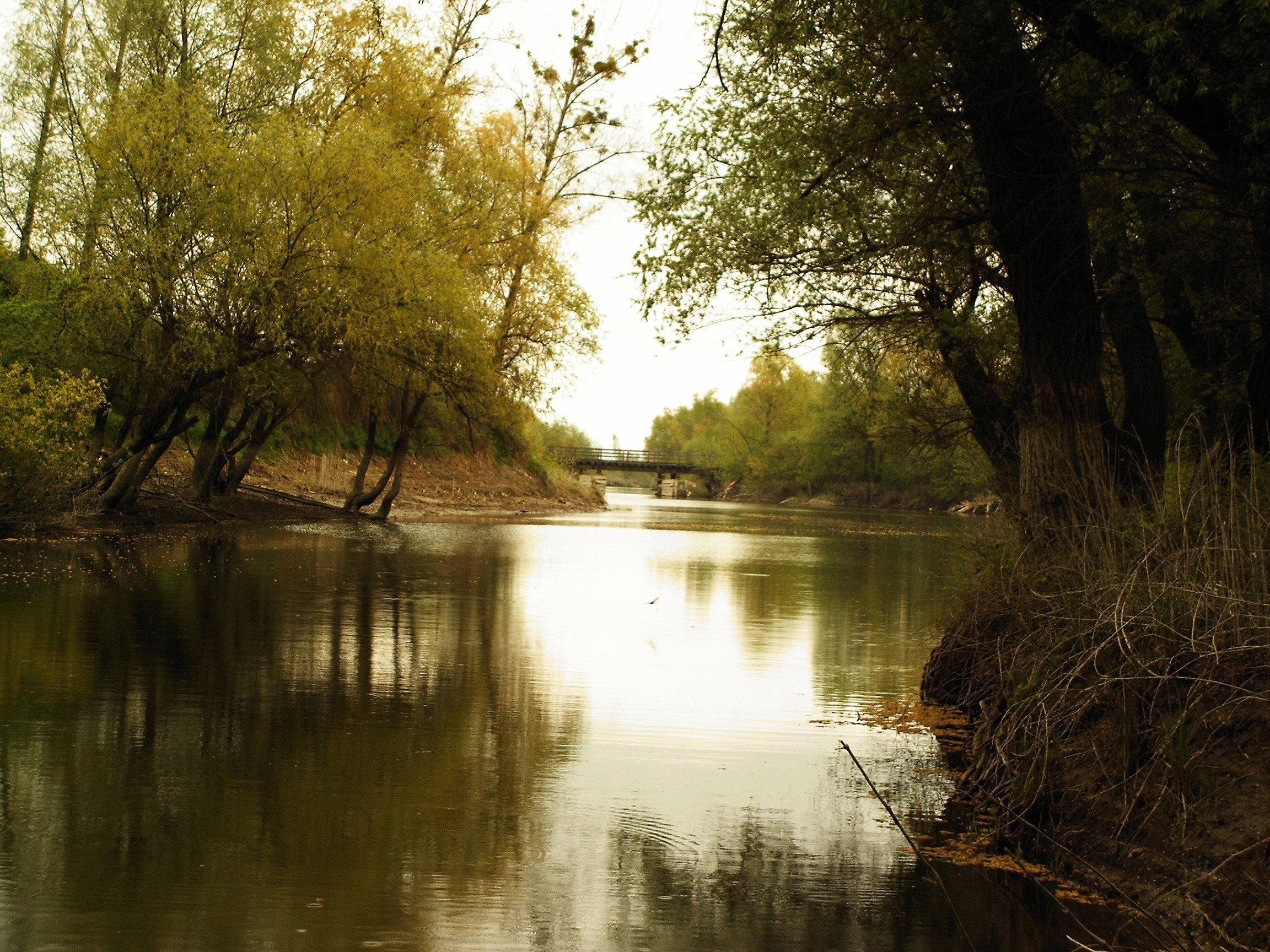
Bug River

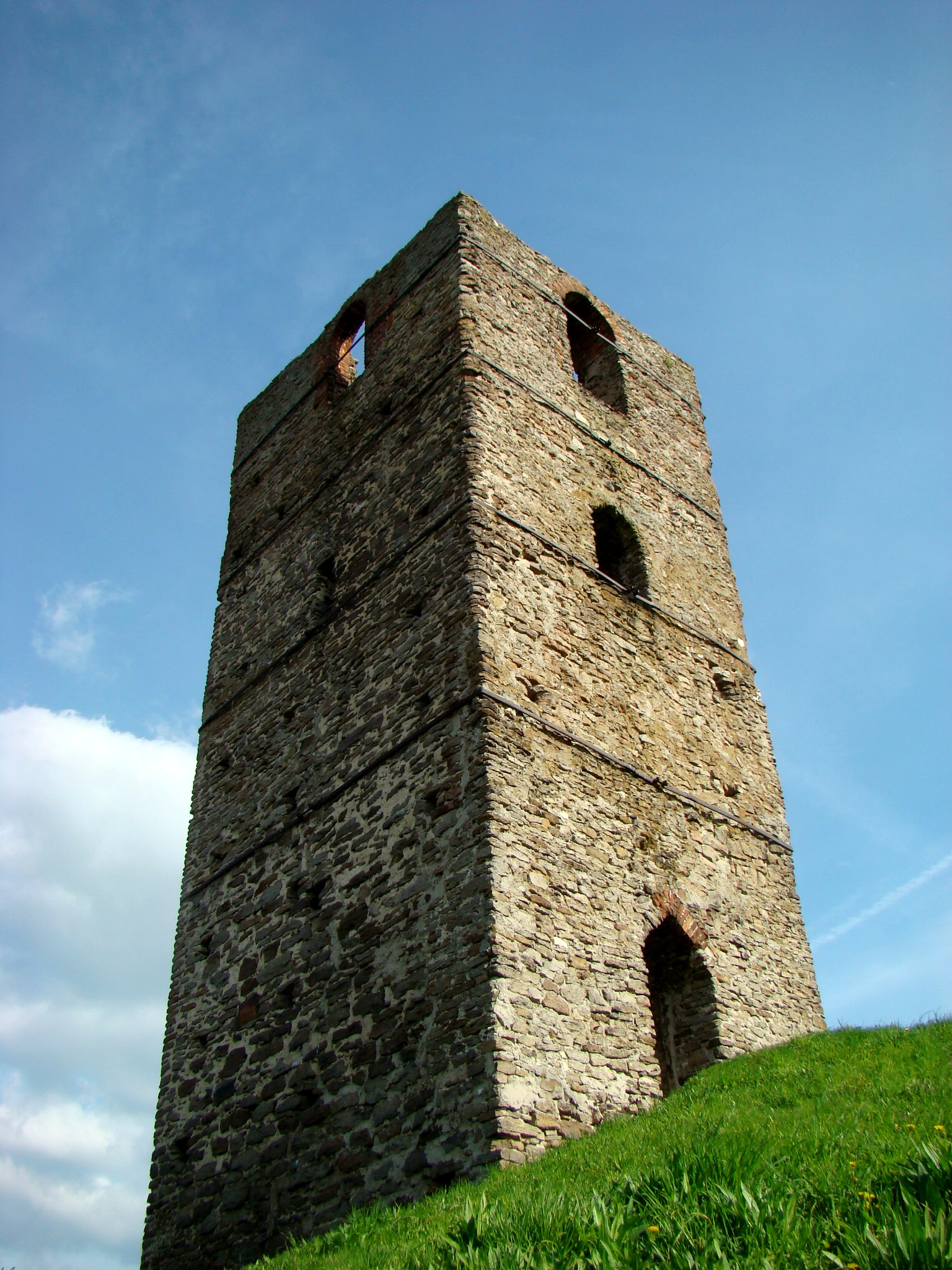
Stołpie

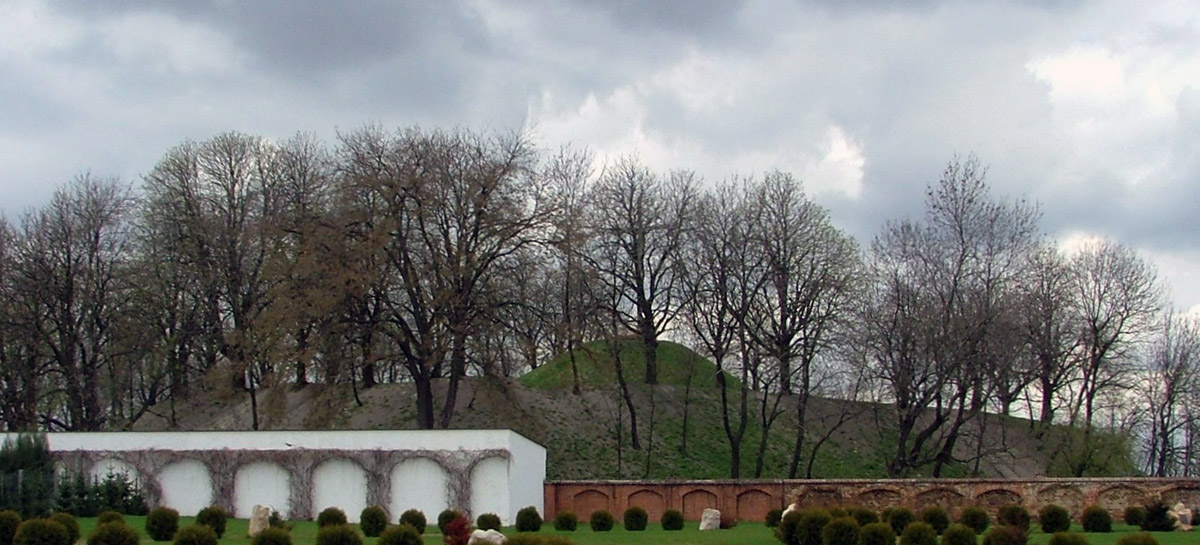
Gord (Chełm)

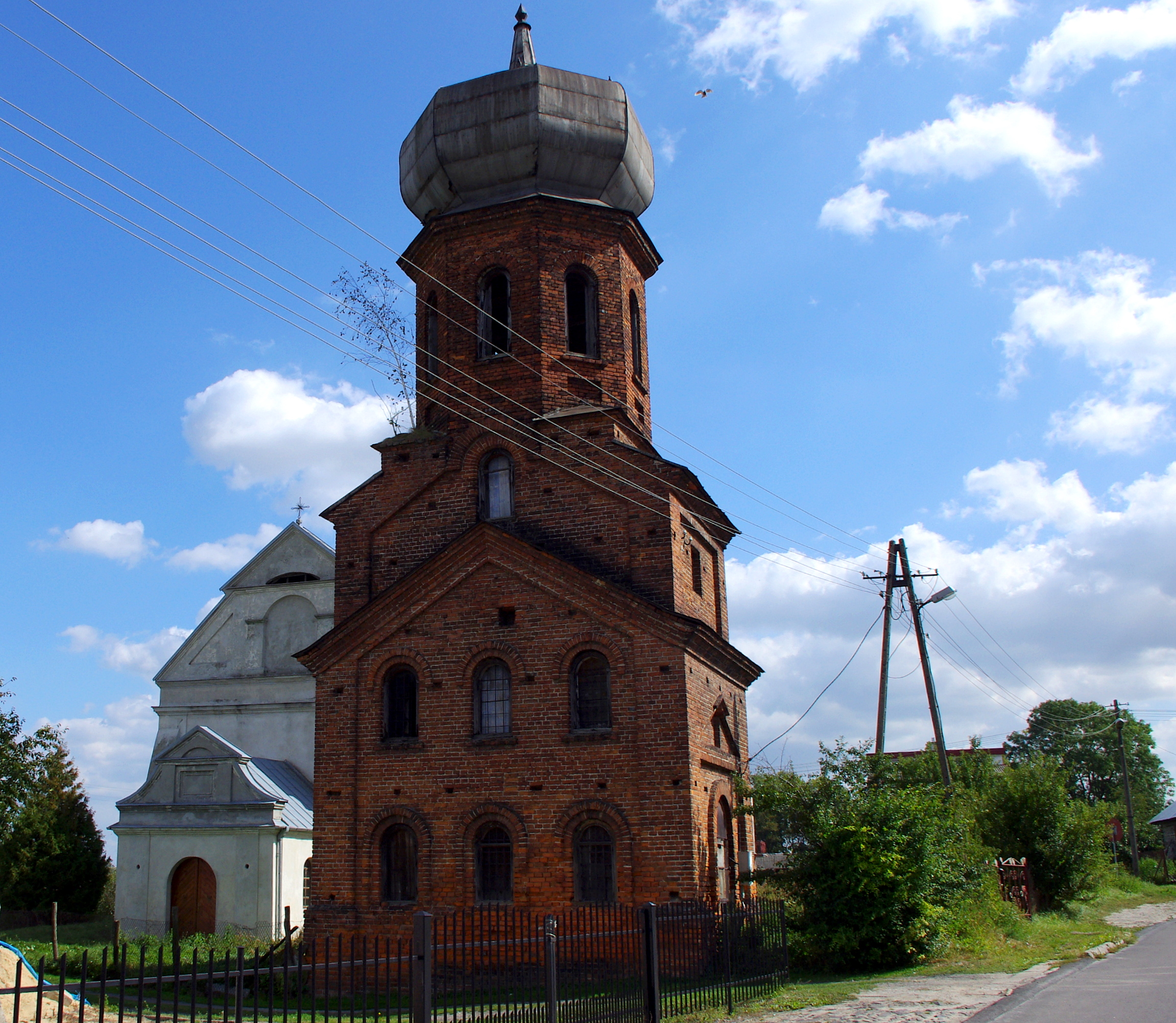
Wojsławice

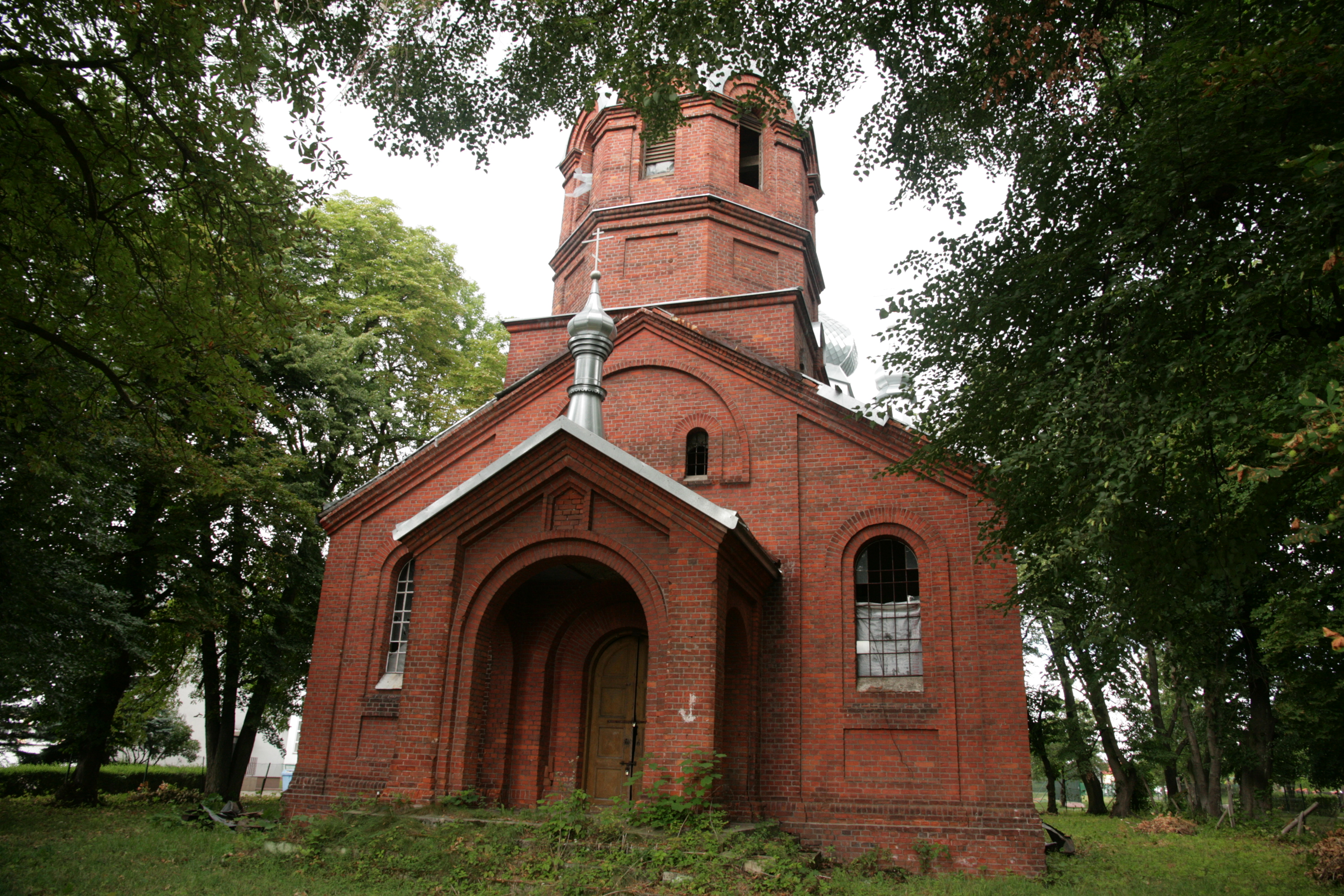
Dubienka
