= Rusyn =

Rusyn may refer to:

- Rusyns, an East Slavic people
  - Pannonian Rusyns, a branch of Rusyn people
  - Lemkos, a branch of Rusyn (or Ukrainian) people
  - Boykos, a branch of Rusyn (or Ukrainian) people
  - Hutsuls, a branch of Rusyn (or Ukrainian) people
- Rusyn language, an East Slavic language
  - Pannonian Rusyn, a variant of Rusyn language
  - Lemko language, a variant of Rusyn language
- Rusyn, one of several self-appellations of East Slavs (Ruthenians)
- Rusyn (surname), a surname

== See also ==
- Rusin (disambiguation)
- Russian (disambiguation)
- Russin (disambiguation)
- Rüthen, town in the district of Soest, in North Rhine-Westphalia, Germany.
- Ruthenian (disambiguation)
