= Russin (disambiguation) =

Russin is a municipality in the canton of Geneva, Switzerland.

Russin may also refer to:

- Russin (surname)
- Alternate transliteration for Russyn
- A meal served between dinner and supper.

== See also ==
- Rusin (disambiguation)
- Russian (disambiguation)
