= Fort Boyard (British game show) =

British game show

- Logo used in the Channel 5 series
- Genre: Game show
- Created by: Jacques Antoine
- Based on: Fort Boyard by Jacques Antoine
- Directed by: Paul Kirrage (1998–2001); Laurent Daum (2003)
- Presented by: Melinda Messenger; Jodie Penfold
- Starring: Leslie Grantham; Christopher Ellison; Geoffrey Bayldon; Tom Baker
- Theme music composer: Paul Koulak
- Country of origin: United Kingdom
- Original language: English
- No. of series: 5
- No. of episodes: 78

Production
- Executive producers: Richard Holloway (1998–2001); Emma Gunnell (2003); Jonathan Webb (2003)
- Production locations: Fort Boyard, France
- Running time: 60–80 mins (inc. adverts)
- Production companies: Adventure Line Productions; Grundy Productions (1998–2001); Thames (2001); Ronin TV (2003)

Original release
- Network: Channel 5
- Release: 16 October 1998 – 29 December 2001
- Network: Challenge
- Release: 20 October – 3 December 2003

Related
- The Crystal Maze; The Desert Forges; Fort Boyard: Takes On The World; Fort Boyard: Ultimate Challenge

Fort Boyard is a British game show devised by Jacques Antoine, based upon his format for the French game show of the same name that was first broadcast in 1990. The programme is set and recorded at the eponymous fortress situated off the western coast of France. The British version aired for five series, spanning from 16 October 1998 to 3 December 2003. The first four series were broadcast on Channel 5, concluding in December 2001. Challenge TV then revived the show for a fifth series in 2003 with a ten-part documentary series, Fort Boyard: Takes On The World, broadcast in October 2004.

It was originally presented by Melinda Messenger and starred Leslie Grantham as Boyard, and Geoffrey Bayldon as The Professor; they were replaced by Jodie Penfold, Christopher Ellison and Tom Baker as Captain Baker for the Challenge TV version. Fort Boyard later returned to UK television in January 2012 under a new format aired on children's channel CITV, Fort Boyard: Ultimate Challenge. This version ended in December 2014 after five series, the first two of which were co-produced with Disney XD in the United States.

== Background ==
The origins of the British version dates back to late 1988 when broadcaster Channel 4 commissioned production company Chatsworth Television (at the time producers of Channel 4's Treasure Hunt and ITV's Interceptor, both also game shows created by Antoine) to devise a concept for a British version of the show.

Refurbished between 1988 and 1989, Fort Boyard was transformed from an abandoned sea fortress into a self-contained outdoor television studio equipped with its own power, water, and production facilities. The historic offshore site features on-site catering, a medical infirmary, and a specialised veterinary centre to support cast, crew, and animals during filming.

A pilot of the show funded by Channel 4 and using a basic replica set was filmed in February 1989 at Elstree Studios in London with Richard O'Brien as presenter, as the fortress intended for filming was not available at the time due to its ongoing renovations. The result was deemed unsuccessful and not broadcast, due to the considerable changes required to the French-owned format in order for it to suit a UK audience; this led to Chatsworth producer Malcolm Heyworth contacting Fort Boyard's creator Jacques Antoine about developing an alternative format and proposed a new adapted idea that was substantially different in terms of presentation and style but used a similar format and the same presenter. Channel 4's alternative game show The Crystal Maze first aired on 15 February 1990, five months before the French series.

Footage of O'Brien's pilot, showing the initial idea for the "Treasure Room" segment of the French format, later appears in a casting call advert for the French version, broadcast in May 1990. Further clips and details about the Fort Boyard pilot (then known as Les Clés de Fort Boyard) began to emerge on French television in 2019 and in June 2022, an out of sync twenty-minute edit of the pilot was uploaded on social media by the show's co-creator Pierre Launay.

== Cast ==
In the UK, two sets of presenters have been used for Fort Boyard. The first set appeared during the first four series of the show, which were broadcast by Channel 5, with the second appearing in the 2003 Challenge-aired fifth series. The leading presenters of Fort Boyard on Channel 5 and Challenge were Melinda Messenger (series 1–4) and Jodie Penfold (series 5). Their roles were to give advice and support for the teams, commentate for the viewers, and match wits with Boyard, the "Master of the Fort".

The characters in Fort Boyard were:

- Boyard (played by Leslie Grantham in series 1–4, Christopher Ellison in series 5) is the "Master of the Fort", who sets the challenges that the team must complete to win. In the UK versions of the show, he is portrayed as a selfish, commanding, and malevolent character who takes great pleasure in ensuring that fear and failure plague the contestants. Grantham portrayed these traits slightly more strongly, with Ellison sometimes showing sympathy, or even being generous to the contestants.
- The Professor (Geoffrey Bayldon, series 1–4) is an eccentric scientist who has become mad over the years as a result of being kept prisoner by Boyard in the 'Watch Tower'. His task is to ask the contestants riddles, which, if answered correctly, will give the team a key or clue word. If they do not answer it correctly, he would throw the key into the sea. Along with Captain Baker, he also talks to the contestants briefly before asking the riddles and to the viewers.
- Captain Baker (Tom Baker, series 5), the replacement for The Professor, is an insane sea captain held captive by Boyard. He would also reveal the code word at the end of each episode of the fifth series.

There was also the resident Fort Boyard cast, who first appeared in the French version, and were subsequently featured in most of the other international formats, including the original UK versions, however these were all excluded for Fort Boyard: Ultimate Challenge:

== Famous contestants ==
On 26 December 1999, a celebrity edition of Fort Boyard was broadcast, featuring, Frank Bruno, Samuel Kane, Glenda McKay, Gabby Logan and Sharron Davies as contestants. As a one-off, the show's length was extended to 80 minutes so that the team had to get five keys (instead of four) and the code word in fifty-five minutes. Frank captained the team and won £7,910 for their nominated charity.

Series 3 aired two celebrity editions of Fort Boyard following the success of the 1999 special; broadcast on 5 January and 25 August 2001, one edition featured Rhodri Williams, Lisa Rogers, "Handy" Andy Kane, Tricia Penrose and Phil Gayle as the contestants. Rhodri was the team captain and the team won £14,350 for charity. The other episode featured Anna Walker, Victor Ubogu, Annalise Braakensiek, Tim Vincent and Troy Titus-Adams. Walker captained the team and they won £7,190 for charity.

Another celebrity edition aired at the end of series four (episode 14) in 2001 featuring Sally Gray, Scott Wright, Nell McAndrew, Keith Duffy and Tris Payne. Gray was the team captain and the team won £10,130 for charity. Episode 4 in this series, broadcast on 13 October 2001, was a special featuring contestants from the first series of The Mole. Before they were famous, Nik & Eva Speakman appeared in the eighth episode of the series.

Celebrity editions were also broadcast during the 2003 series by Challenge. It featured Doug Williams, Paul Burchill, Nikita, James Tighe, and Sweet Saraya, all of whom were wrestling stars from British promotion FWA. Williams captained the team and won £190. Other celebrities appearing in series 5 included Tim Vine, Stewart Castledine and Craig Phillips, Big Brother 2000 winner. They were joined by Angel (played by Carrie Clarke) and Natasha (referred to as Tash) from the 2003 Channel 5 reality game show The Honey Trap. The team won £1,820 for charity, which was topped up by a further £5,000 because team captain Vine accepted a challenge to tell 10 jokes in one minute.

== Format ==
The British versions largely followed the same rules as the original French format but was a more condensed version of the show. A team of contestants enter the Fort with the intention of winning as many gold boyars (the currency inside) as possible. To do this, the contestants must successfully pass a series of physical and intellectual challenges set by The Master of the Fort. The contestants have to go through two phases, the first in which they must recover keys that will open the gate to the treasure room, the second phase in which they search for clues to discover the code word that unlocks the gold treasure.

== Production ==
The Channel 5 run was produced by Paul Kirrage and executive produced by Richard Holloway, later known for producing The X Factor and other high-profile shows on UK television, for Grundy Productions (a subsidiary of Pearson Television) and later Thames Television in 2001. In March 2002, Channel 5’s new entertainment controller, Andrew Newman, cancelled the show during a major station revamp. Despite drawing reasonable ratings, it was cut to help shed the network's "tacky" image. The overhaul aimed to boost audience share, attract wealthier viewers, and open up prime-time slots for fresh creative concepts.

In July 2003, it was announced that the format would be revived, with a new look and different presenters, and this time broadcast on Challenge. It was the channel's first-ever original commission of an adventure-style game show.

== Broadcast ==
In total, 57 episodes were shown in the original Channel 5 series; including four celebrity specials and a special edition with contestants from the first UK series of The Mole. It initially aired on Fridays at 8 pm before moving to Saturdays at 6 pm for its fourth series. The revival produced for Challenge TV, which featured two celebrity specials, was broadcast in a weekday early evening timeslot at 5 pm.

Both iterations of the show featured companion behind-the-scenes documentaries that aired prior to their respective launches. Joe Mace narrated the first special, An Adventure In The Making, which aired under Channel 5's Exclusive! (1997–2002) entertainment banner. The second, Inside The Fort, was a stand-alone programme narrated by Jayne Middlemiss. Both were uploaded online in July 2026 and include on-location interviews with the relevant cast and crew, with the former also showing footage of the audition process.

On 1 July 2014, Challenge announced on social media that they had re-acquired all the Channel 5 years of the show (previously repeated by the channel from 2002 to 2006) and would begin airing series 1–2 in August that year, with series 3 and 4 following in 2015. Series 1 started on 4 August at 5 pm, followed by series 2 on 18 August 2014. Series 3 started on 7 May 2015 at 6 pm and was later followed by Series 4.

=== Regular series ===
| Series | Start date | End date | Episodes |
|---|---|---|---|
| 1 | 16 October 1998 | 18 December 1998 | 10 |
| 2 | 19 November 1999 | 18 February 2000 | 14 |
| 3 | 3 November 2000 | 5 January 2001 | 16 |
| 3 | 30 June 2001 | 18 August 2001 | 16 |
| 4 | 22 September 2001 | 22 December 2001 | 13 |
| 5 | 20 October 2003 | 3 December 2003 | 20 |

=== Celebrity specials ===
Date
26 December 1999
5 January 2001
25 August 2001
29 December 2001

=== Takes on the World ===
| Series | Start date | End date | Episodes |
|---|---|---|---|
| 1 | 18 October 2004 | 29 October 2004 | 10 |

== Fort Boyard: Takes On The World ==
Broadcast in October 2004 by Challenge, Fort Boyard: Takes On The World was a ten-part documentary which introduced British viewers to various different versions of the show from around the world. Comedian and former contestant Tim Vine was the presenter and also provided the voiceover. The show was split into sections including "The Good, The Bad and The Ugly", "Heroes and Zeroes" and "The A-Z of Fort Boyard". There were also on-location interviews with various characters of the Fort (with the humour provided by the fact that Tim cannot speak French and the characters cannot speak English).
