= Rossiyanka =

- Russian: россиянка
- Romanization: rossiyanka
- Literal meaning: fem. singular for citizen of Russia

Rossiyanka may refer to:

- Rossiyanka, female citizen of Russia, regardless of ethnicity
- WFC Rossiyanka, Russian women's football
- ROSSIYANKA, Russian Reusable launch system

== See also ==
- Rossiyanin, male citizen of Russia, regardless of ethnicity
- Russian (disambiguation)
