= Nik Russian con =

Reality TV Swindle

Nik Russian (pictured) perpetrated a con in 2002. In the following months, much of the media attention was placed on him, with commentators speculating that Russian's physical appearance may have helped him perpetrate his swindle. Critics described Russian as "beautiful" and "Byronic-looking", and noted that he "appeared every inch the cocky TV producer he aspired to be".

In 2002, a con was perpetrated by Nik Russian, a British man who, at the time, was working at an entry-level position in a branch of the UK book chain Waterstone's. Russian placed advertisements in major publications that invited people to audition for a year-long reality television programme where they could potentially win a prize of £100,000. After receiving hundreds of responses, he auditioned some of them on Raven's Ait in London, then selected 30 successful auditionees to take part, without informing them that no actual programme had been commissioned. Telling them that the show—to which he had given the working title Project MS-2—would last for an entire year, Russian instructed the participants to leave their homes, quit their jobs and then meet him in London on 10 June, where they would be divided into teams of ten and set their challenge for the next twelve months.

The challenge was to make £1 million in a single year. Realising that they would essentially be making their own prize money, most contestants quit the show within two days. One group stayed together for slightly longer: sleeping on the floor of their cameraman's flat, they attempted to create their own TV show about themselves. Having also given up his flat and job, Russian was also homeless, and was forced to stay with the contestants he had manipulated. After the programme failed, Russian went into hiding, and was unable to be contacted. He was eventually tracked down by one of his victims to an address in Richmond upon Thames, where he was forced to apologise on camera. As he had not taken any money from his victims, a criminal case against Russian was not pursued—a civil case was also not pursued due to a lack of funds.

== Background ==
=== Nik Russian ===
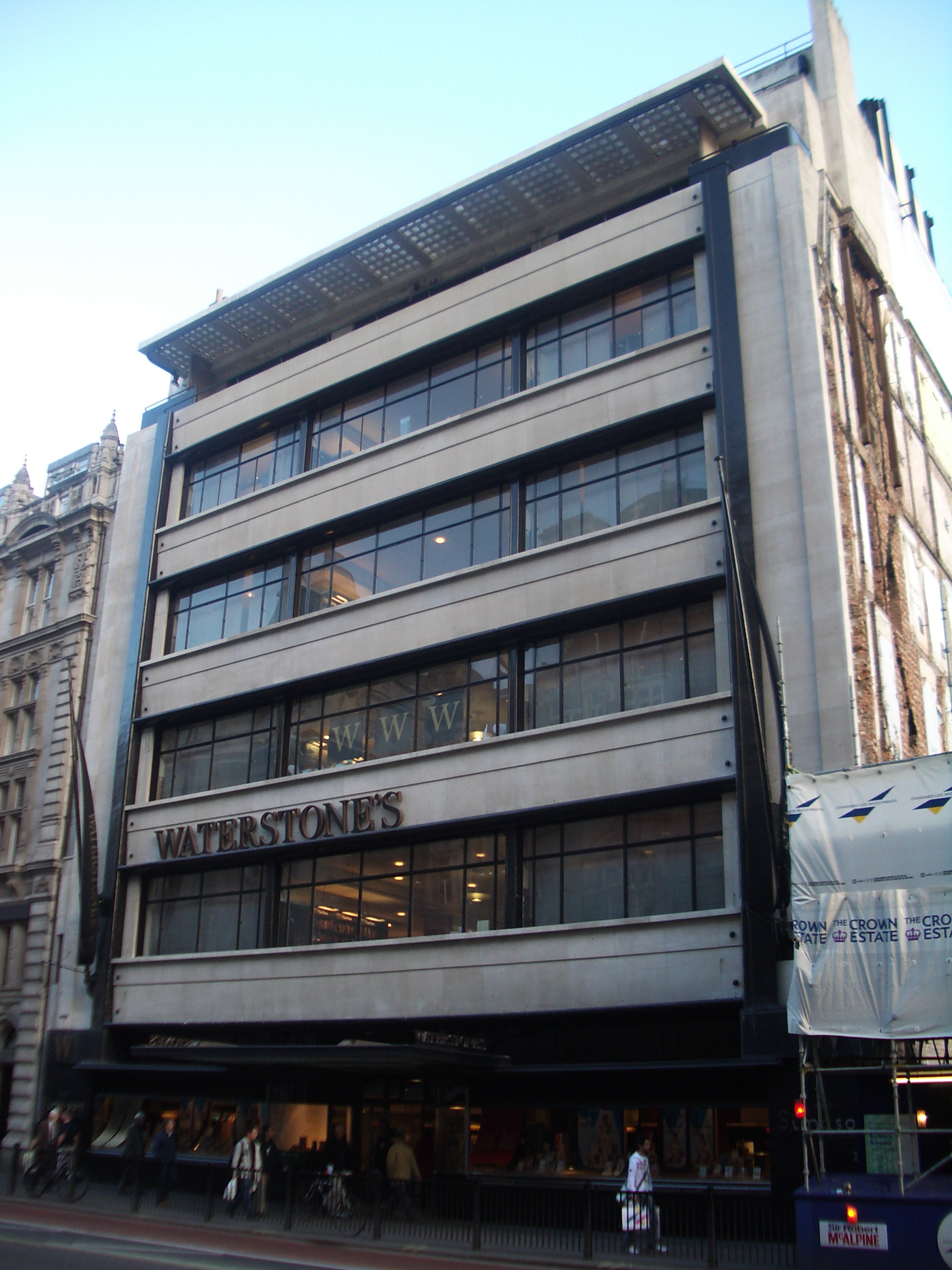
At the time of the swindle, Russian was working part-time in the biography section of Waterstone's in Piccadilly (pictured in 2005).

Nikita "Nik" Russian was born Keith Anthony Gillard in Surrey in 1977. Raised in Farnham, he legally changed his name to Jack Lister in his early twenties, then changed it again to Nikita Russian. He studied English at Goldsmiths, University of London, but dropped out before the exams. He had set up businesses and written unpublished novels before taking a job working part-time in the biography section of Waterstone's in Piccadilly—he subsequently decided that he wanted to produce his own reality television programme.

=== Reality television ===
Reality TV was a popular genre of television programming in the UK in 2002. The third series of the UK version of Big Brother—which was showing while Russian's con took place—attracted audience figures of approximately 5.8 million. Most British reality TV programmes at the time centred on a team of people trying to accomplish a specific goal or target. For example, the 2000 series Jailbreak challenged a group to escape from a mock prison, while the 2001 series The Mole gave the contestants the task of discovering which of them was sabotaging their attempts to win money. Most reality TV shows offered a cash reward to successful participants—both Jailbreak and the first series of The Mole offered a prize of £100,000.

Several reality TV contestants were able to become celebrities in their own right after raising their profiles on television. Craig Phillips and Brian Dowling, the winners of the first two series of Big Brother, both created successful media careers. Phillips had been featured as a DIY expert on programmes such as BBC's Trading Up and ITV's Renovation Street, while Dowling became the UK's first openly gay children's TV presenter when he hosted the Saturday morning programme SMTV Live. Ben Fogle, a contestant on the BBC reality series Castaway 2000, went on to become a television presenter for several programmes, and hosted his own series called Extreme Dreams.

== Con ==
=== Auditions ===
In early 2002, Russian placed advertisements for a year-long television programme in publications such as The Stage and the Evening Standard, which invited "characterful, resourceful and energetic" people to apply for the chance to "raise [their] profile" and potentially win £100,000. Russian was emailed more than a thousand applications and auditioned some of them on the Raven's Ait island in London. Some had applied simply for the prize money; others hoped that exposure from the programme could help them to achieve some of their dreams, such as working as a television presenter or launching a fashion label.

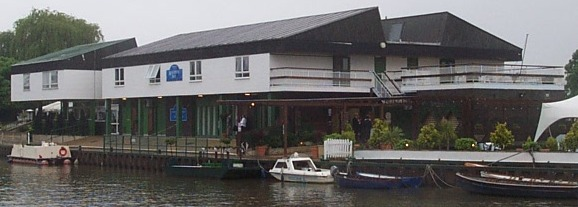
Auditions for Russian's show were held on Raven's Ait in London.

The auditionees were told that the show was being created by the production company Nikita Russian Productions (NRP). For the purposes of the auditions, Russian enlisted the help of his friends to take on roles such as psychoanalysts and runners—his girlfriend, whom he had met on a university access course, acted as a psychological assessor, while his childhood friend Michael Fabbri was a cameraman. A director, David Wilder, was also brought on for the auditions process. The auditionees were divided into small groups and given practical and psychological tests to complete, such as participating in trust falls and baking a cake in under an hour without a kitchen or ingredients. From these auditionees, 30 people were selected to star in Russian's programme, to which he had given the working title Project MS-2.

The winning candidates were informed of their success in an email from NRP and were also sent various contracts to sign and return. They were told that the project would last for a year, so most of them gave up their flats and jobs. The contracts stated that their food, accommodation and leisure money would be provided, and that they were to meet in London on 10 June 2002 for the programme to begin filming. Each contestant was also told to set up a new bank account to which Russian could have access and to arrive without money or credit cards on the launch day.

=== Launch day ===
The 30 contestants were divided into three teams of ten named Team 1, Team 2 and Team 3, and each group met in a different London location on 10 June, the day of the programme's launch. To record what each team did, Russian hired unpaid trainee cameramen; one contestant, Lucie Miller, was asked to co-present the series with Russian. Once the teams were assembled, they were given their challenge: in a year, they had to make £1 million. Their first task was to find accommodation for themselves for free for a week. The contestants slowly realised that, despite what their contracts had claimed, they would have to find their own food and accommodation, and would essentially be making their own prize money. Some contestants demanded to meet with Russian, who eventually revealed to them that no television channel had actually commissioned his show. Teams 1 and 3 disbanded within two days.

Team 2 remained together for slightly longer. Sleeping on the floor of the flat in Dalston that belonged to their cameraman Tim Eagle—a former clown—the team decided to film their own reality TV programme about themselves, and set up a "diary room" to discuss their thoughts about Russian and his show. On 12 June, Eagle contacted the local news programme, London Tonight, and the group locked Russian in the flat, forcing him to speak with the journalists once they had arrived. After their story made the local news, Team 2 stayed together until 14 June before they also split up.

Russian never paid for the use of the island, the crew, "all of them trainees who had given their services and equipment for free", were, mostly, college students. Doug Travers, the team leader, and Amy Dixon, the team co-ordinator did not exist, and Russian's production company was fictitious.

== Aftermath ==
Having believed that they would be participating in Russian's television programme for an entire year, most contestants had given up their homes, jobs and partners—most had to find new employment and some were forced to move in with their parents. Russian went into hiding and was unable to be reached by his victims. On 13 June 2002, Debbie Leigh Driver, one of Russian's victims, contacted Caz Gorham and Frances Dickenson of the independent production company Christmas TV & Film and told them about the hoax. Gorham and Dickenson produced The Great Reality TV Swindle, a TV programme that documented the story of the con and how the participants were now trying to get their lives back together, which was shown on Channel 4 in December 2002.

Some participants tried to track Russian down to have their questions answered. One contestant, Louise Miles, discovered that Russian's production company, NRP, did not actually exist and that the woman who had been answering their phone calls was really Russian's mother, Margaret. Another participant, Daniel Pope, managed to track Russian down to an address in Richmond upon Thames and convinced him to be interviewed by Christmas TV and apologise on camera. As Russian had not actually taken money from his victims, he had not committed a crime, and a civil case was not pursued due to a lack of funds.

== Media reaction ==
In exaggerated form, [this con] invites discussion about the ethics of factual television and the exploitation of film subjects, and of their aspirations as participants in celebrity culture within a post-documentary context. It also dramatises the ongoing and usually taken-for-granted reflexivity of reality TV itself; which is often a platform for television to talk about itself.

— Anita Biressi and Heather Nunn

Much of the mainstream media's reaction to the con was published in December 2002, around the time that The Great Reality TV Swindle was shown on Channel 4. Although most commentators placed the blame for the swindle on Russian himself by denouncing him as a manipulative con man, others were more sympathetic. Rupert Smith of The Guardian described Russian as a "tragic figure".

Some critics placed blame on the contestants' overly trusting nature and desire for fame, calling them gullible wannabes. Others noted the irony in how the con had, ultimately, put them on television, which Gorham described as "a happy ending". In another article for The Guardian, Smith remarked: "These are not stupid people. In archive footage from the fake show, they look like any other post-Big-Brother buffoons; but in the sombre, reflective interviews after the event they come across as likable, wounded individuals."

Other commentators speculated that Russian's physical appearance may have helped him perpetrate his con. Critics described him as "beautiful" and "Byronic-looking", and noted that he "appeared every inch the cocky TV producer he aspired to be". Some felt that the con represented an indictment on how reality television had altered the public's notion of celebrity. Paul English of The Daily Record noted that the swindle reflected a "fascination with reality TV – and how the draw of being on telly can turn us into gullible fools". Both of Christmas TV's producers agreed. Gorham called the con "a fantastic wake-up call for reality TV"; Dickenson remarked: "I hope [the swindle] shows those who may be interested in these programmes that they should be careful."

In 2022, a second documentary about the con was produced by Safe Harbour Films and Factual Fiction, and distributed by Amazon Studios. Titled The Greatest Show Never Made, the three-part series retells the story of the swindle, and provides updates on the lives of six of the contestants and an interview with Russian—now living as an author under the name Nick Quentin Woolf—reflecting on his actions. The Greatest Show Never Made was made available to stream on Amazon Prime Video in October 2023.

== See also ==
- The Great Rock 'n' Roll Swindle – a 1980 film that lends its name to The Great Reality TV Swindle
- List of confidence tricks
- The X Factor (British TV series) series 8 – the eighth series of the British reality TV programme The X Factor, in which Wilder participated as a contestant
