= Deal or No Deal (British game show) =

British game show

- Genre: Game show
- Based on: Deal or No Deal by John de Mol Jr. and Dick de Rijk
- Presented by: Noel Edmonds; Stephen Mulhern
- Theme music composer: Augustin Bousfield
- Country of origin: United Kingdom
- Original language: English
- No. of episodes: 3,153 (Note: As of 22 August 2026. This number of episodes comprises: Channel 4 era (3,001 episodes): 2,985 regular episodes, 13 celebrity specials, 3 other episodes: the '8 Out of 10 Cats' special, the 10th anniversary special (where Noel Edmonds was the contestant) and the 2013 'Christmas Star' show (the 2007-8 'Christmas Star' shows were, however, included in the show count); ITV1 era (152 episodes): 140 regular episodes, 12 celebrity specials.)

Production
- Executive producers: Stephen Lovelock (2024–present); Tamara Gilder (2023–2024); Cat Lawson (2023–2024); David Hall (2023); Richard Hague (2005–2016); Glenn Hugill (2005–2013); Richard Osman (2005–2007)
- Production locations: Paintworks (2005–2013); The Bottle Yard Studios (2013–2016); Dock10 (2023); The Maidstone Studios (2024–present)
- Running time: ca. 36 minutes (2005–2010); ca. 46 minutes (2011–2016; 2023–present)
- Production companies: Cheetah Television West (2005–2009) (Note: Known as Endemol West during series 1); Remarkable Entertainment (2009–2016; 2023–present) (Note: Known from 2009–2016 as Remarkable Television)

Original release
- Network: Channel 4
- Release: 31 October 2005 – 23 December 2016
- Network: ITV1
- Release: 20 November 2023 – present

Deal or No Deal is a British game show. It was originally presented by Noel Edmonds from 31 October 2005 to 23 December 2016 on Channel 4, and then by Stephen Mulhern from 20 November 2023 on ITV1. The show is produced by Banijay UK Productions subsidiary Remarkable Entertainment.

Based on the standard European daytime format of the show first used in the Italian version, each episode sees a contestant choosing one of 22 boxes, each containing a cash amount. A contestant winning is determined by luck – cash amounts are randomly allocated to each of the boxes before the game, with contestants required to open a specific number of boxes per round of the game to eliminate the cash amounts their chosen box does not contain, in turn affecting how much is offered by the Banker. Games always end with the player opening all of the boxes, including their own, regardless of how they intend to make money.

On 19 August 2016, Channel 4 decommissioned Deal or No Deal after almost 11 years on air, ending the show with an On Tour series across the United Kingdom, with the programme concluding on 23 December 2016. In 2022, six years later, two pilots were filmed at dock10 studios, following which ITV commissioned a revival series of twenty episodes to be broadcast on ITV1. The series premiered on 20 November 2023. On 29 January 2024, it was announced that the revival was to be renewed for an extended second run by ITV alongside celebrity specials.

== Gameplay ==
The game is played using 22 sealed red boxes, each with an identifying number from 1 to 22 displayed on the front. Inside each box is a sum of money, ranging from 1p to £250,000 in the original version, and from 1p to £100,000 in the revival. All the boxes are sealed by an independent adjudicator, who is the only person to know the value inside each box.

At the start of each game, one of the 22 contestants, each standing behind one of the boxes randomly chosen prior to the show's recording, is selected to be the player for that episode. The contestant's box contains their potential prize. The contestants themselves do not know who is to play until it is revealed at the beginning of the show. During the game, boxes are opened by the remaining 21 contestants; who offer support and advice. These contestants return for the following episodes, along with a new contestant replacing the previous episode's player. This provides continuity between shows.

One at a time, the contestant chooses one of the 21 remaining boxes to be opened, eliminating the value inside it from the board. It is in the contestant's interest to eliminate smaller amounts of money ("blues") in the hope that their box contains a larger amount ("reds") or so that they can get a higher offer from the Banker for the potential contents of their box. There are six rounds: in the opening round, five boxes are opened, then three in each subsequent round. (Note: From series 12 onward, two boxes for the penultimate round and only one for the final round, increasing the number of rounds to seven.)

After the required number of boxes have been opened in a round, the Banker offers to buy the contestant's box. The amount is dependent on the remaining box values: if several larger amounts are gone, the offer is likely to be low, as the probability is higher that the contestant's box contains a small amount of money. The host tells the contestant the offer and asks the eponymous question. The contestant responds either "deal" or "no deal". Responding with "deal" means the contestant agrees to sell their box for the amount of money offered, relinquishing the prize in the box. The game exits 'live play', and the game continues to show the hypothetical outcome had the contestant not dealt. Saying "no deal" means the contestant keeps their box, and proceeds to the next round, again hoping to reveal small amounts in the remaining boxes.

After the final round, only two boxes remain. If the contestant rejects the final offer and has not dealt, their box will be opened and whatever prize it contains will be what the player has won. However, in some circumstances, the Banker can offer the opportunity for the contestant to swap their box with the other remaining unopened box and take the prize contained in the other box instead.

=== Box values ===
==== Channel 4 version (2005–16) ====
1p
10p
50p
£1
£5
£10
£50
£100
£250
£500
£750

£1,000
£3,000
£5,000
£10,000
£15,000
£20,000
£35,000
£50,000
£75,000
£100,000
£250,000

==== ITV1 version (2023–present) ====
1p
10p
50p
£1
£5
£10
£50
£100
£250
£500
£750

£1,000
£2,000
£3,000
£4,000
£5,000
£7,500
£10,000
£25,000
£50,000
£75,000
£100,000

=== Twists ===
In the Channel 4 series, various twists, either during themed special shows or permanently, applied to the gameplay. From 2014 to 2016, "Box 23" was added to the game. This allowed contestants to purchase it with their winnings to either double their winnings, halve it, add £10,000, lose it all, or have no change. In the same year, the "offer button" was added – meaning that if the contestant predicted their first offer within a 10% range, they were able to call for an offer from the Banker at any time. Other twists like the "Banker's Gamble" (meaning a player could return dealt money to win whatever is in their box) or progressing one box at a time before an offer were factors in achieving the original top prize winners. In the ITV series, no twists were initially used, however the swap was reintroduced in series 3.

== Production ==
Presenters of Deal or No Deal

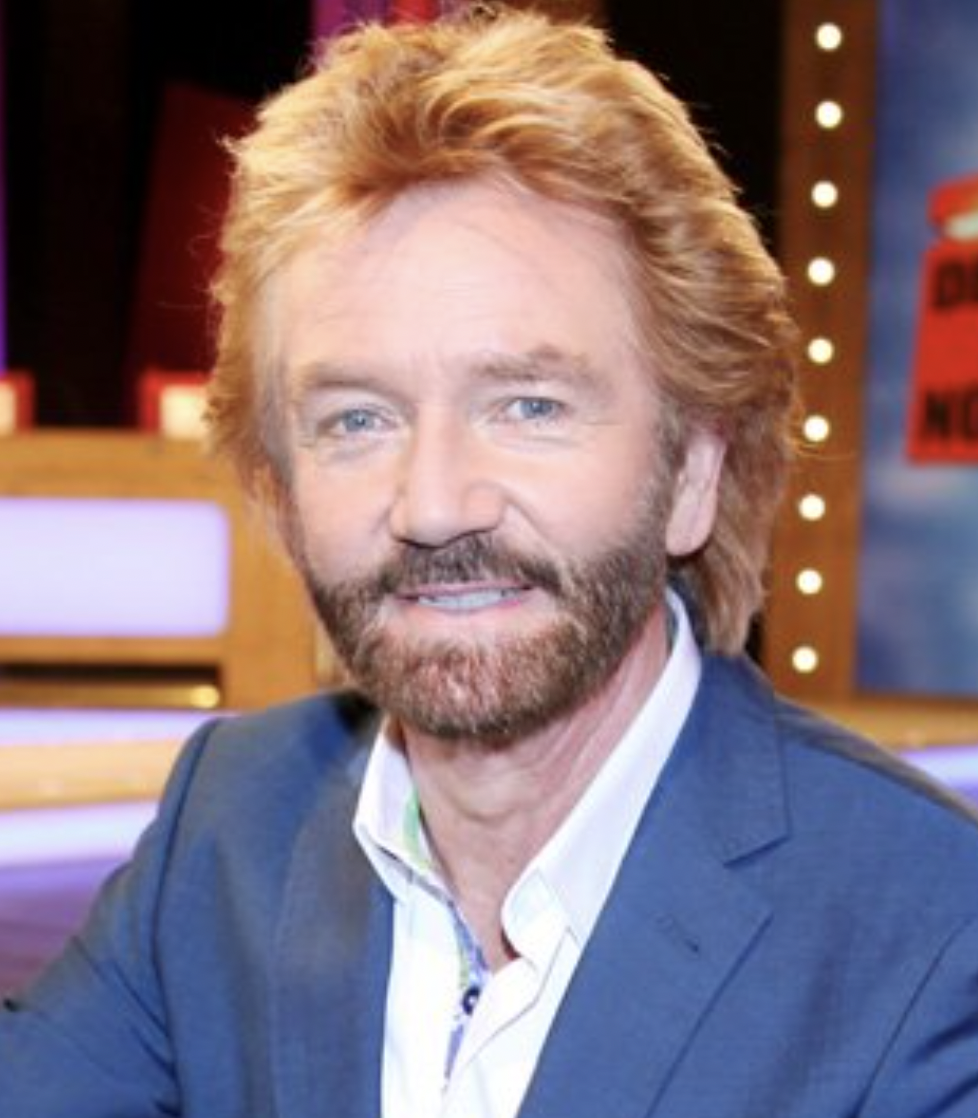
Noel Edmonds

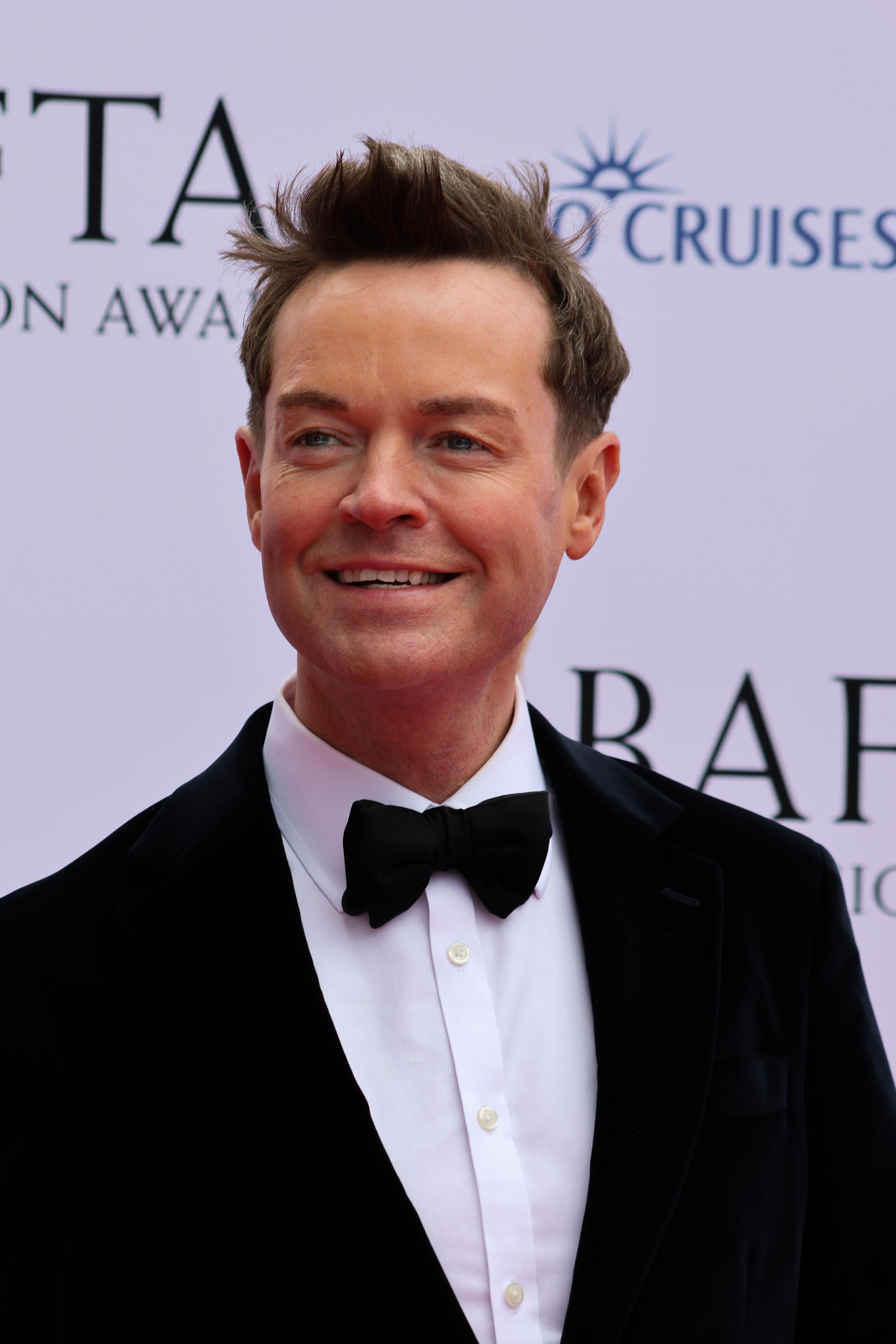
Stephen Mulhern

Deal or No Deal was produced by Endemol and supported by BBC Studios and Post Production, a commercial subsidiary of the BBC. The original studio set for the show was converted from an old paintworks factory (now the Paintworks development) and its associated warehouses in Bristol. Throughout its broadcast, the programme was regularly aired daily – for its first eight series, the show was aired six days a week for a year, with breaks in production between July and August. In addition, the show also showcased a series of special celebrity editions, including a special 10th anniversary edition on 18 September 2015 in which Edmonds played the game himself. The show was put on hiatus by Channel 4 various times between 2015 and 2016, returning in October 2016 to conclude its studio-based run, which ended on 11 December 2016. The special Deal or No Deal on Tour episodes aired from 12 to 23 December 2016, bringing Deal or No Deal to an end.

Endemol announced that it would be bringing the franchise to the UK in August 2005, with Channel 4 as broadcaster. Channel 4 initially commissioned a run of 66 episodes, with filming beginning in October 2005. The first episode was broadcast on 31 October that year. Channel 4 then commissioned a second filming period at the end of 2005.

Episodes of Deal or No Deal are pre-recorded. By May 2006, episodes were being filmed Monday to Friday at a rate of fifteen episodes a week. Three episodes were recorded in a day in two sessions, one edition in the afternoon using one audience, and then two episodes filmed in the evening using a different audience. The studio operated from 9:00 to 22:00. For the ITV series, three episodes are filmed a day, two in the morning and a third in the afternoon. Almost all episodes are filmed with a Steadicam operator. Having initially begun filming episodes just a few weeks in advance, each new period of filming then began several months in advance, and at a peak rate of fifteen episodes a week being filmed, the delay between filming and broadcast varies; it can be months between the filming date and broadcast date for a particular episode. For a two-week period starting on 10 October 2011, live episodes of the show were broadcast in place of the routine pre-recorded episodes to celebrate its six-year anniversary.

In October 2013, production moved to the Bottle Yard Studios, Bristol, which had been purpose-built to house the show. Filming for Series 10 began on 28 October 2013 at the new location, subsequently making its debut in December. The main studio for the first ITV series was based in the dock10 studios of MediaCityUK, and in 2024, production moved to Studio 1 at Maidstone Studios in Kent, which has been used to film the show since the second revival series.

=== Participants ===
The game show participants comprise the host, the unseen character of the Banker, the main contestant playing that day's game, the other 21 contestants, and a studio audience. Audience members, who were often referred to as "pilgrims" by Edmonds, are commonly asked for opinions on whether the contestant should "Deal or No Deal".

The contestants who appear on Deal or No Deal come from all backgrounds and age groups. When on the show, they are kept in a hotel for the duration of their time on the show and are encouraged to get to know each other during this time. The oldest contestant to have played the game was 97-year-old Chelsea Pensioner Joe Britton, who played in April 2009. Britton won £20,000 and gave all the money away. He died in October 2014, aged 103. Contestants who appeared and later went on to fame include 2009 X Factor runner-up Olly Murs, who won £10, politician Aaron Bell, who won £25,000, and Shahid Khan, known as Naughty Boy, who won £44,000. Additionally, Big Brother 16 contestant and YouTuber Jack McDermott and Big Brother 20 contestant Kerry Riches appeared on the show in its early series, with Riches notably enduring a studio power cut during her game.

==== Top prize winners ====
Nine contestants have won the top prize. All winners of the top prize (as well as certain non-top prize winners) are allowed to keep their box. In the original Channel 4 series, nine contestants won the prize.

| No. | Date | Contestant | Prize | Notes |
|---|---|---|---|---|
| 1 | 7 January 2007 | Laura Pearce | £250,000 | First winner. |
| 2 | 12 March 2009 | Alice Mundy | £250,000 | Originally dealt at £17,500, but accepted the "Banker's Gamble" to re-enter the game (winning either 1p or £250,000 in her box). |
| 3 | 13 May 2011 | Suzanne Mulholland | £250,000 | First contestant to have the "dream finish" (having both the £100,000 and the £250,000 boxes in play as the final two boxes). The first and only contestant to win by swapping her box. Also won a holiday. |
| 4 | 22 September 2011 | Tegen Roberts | £250,000 | |
| 5 | 5 August 2012 | Nong Skett | £250,000 | |
| 6 | 12 August 2013 | Paddy Roberts | £250,000 | First male winner and the youngest winner at age 18. |
| 7 | 12 February 2014 | Roop Singh | £250,000 | First winner to be offered Box 23, and would have won £500,000 if he had purchased it. |
| 8 | 15 October 2015 | Ann Crawford | £250,000 | Oldest winner. Second winner to be offered Box 23, and would have lost her winnings if she had purchased it. |
| 9 | 23 December 2016 | Vikki Heenan | £250,000 | The last player to win the £250,000. It was won in the last ever episode of the programme's series before the revival. Game was played in Kelvingrove Museum. |

=== Special episodes and Double Trouble episodes ===
Show logo from 2011 to 2016

During the original Channel 4 series, many special and seasonal episodes of Deal or No Deal aired with themes including Halloween, Guy Fawkes Night, Christmas, Valentine's Day, Easter, Summer and the "Banker's Birthday" week. From 2015, due to the show's inconsistent scheduling, the seasonal episode format was retired, with the show instead featuring "Double Trouble" episodes, where two related contestants played together. An addition added in this format is the "Banker's Breakup Quiz", where the pair were questioned about each other.

== The Banker ==
The Banker is the name given to the show's quasi-fictional main antagonist. Notionally, the money on the game board is the Banker's own. As such, his role is to make cash offers (usually with the first few digits being odd [e.g., £5,900]) to buy the contestant's chosen box rather than allowing them to continue and risk them winning much more. The Banker is played by "Himself", as stated in the end credits. He talks to the host via the Bakelite telephone on the contestant's desk, and also regularly talks to the player.

As Broadcast magazine noted in March 2006, the UK version of the show was the first to exploit the potential for the Banker to be an active character. Despite not being seen or heard on screen, this personification led to a high degree of public and media interest. The Guardian newspaper called the Banker "a cult character in the making and no mistake" and included him in their hotlist. Television programmes such as Harry Hill's TV Burp, GMTV, Richard & Judy and Dead Ringers all made jokes about and regularly speculated as to the Banker's real identity. As the show progressed, the Banker's fictitious back story has been built up through the character's conversations with Edmonds and the daily contestants. Edmonds describes the Banker as an older man, who is overweight and has little hair. The Banker has made several references to his six ex-wives, mother, two boxer dogs and also to his estranged son, to whom he never speaks on account of his being a charity worker.

On several occasions, the Banker's voice can be heard. He has been heard laughing maniacally, blowing kisses and imitating Basil Brush. Contestants have described his voice as sounding like "a dirty phone call", "old and sexy", "rather like well-spoken deep voiced fellow contestant Lance" and "the Scream man". Edmonds often imitated the Banker's voice in a deep Churchillian tone. Short utterances or other audio from the Banker's end of the phone call can occasionally be heard by the viewer. The Observer interviewed Edmonds in relation to the show on 29 January 2006, quoting Edmonds as saying that his scenes with the Banker bring out his "inner actor". He revealed his passion for the show and his admiration for the individual community spirit within it, as well as his (later fulfilled) ambition that it would eventually hold a Saturday evening prime time slot.

Some sources speculated that the Banker during the Channel 4 version was former Coronation Street actor and host of The Mole, Glenn Hugill, who works as part of the show's production team. Edmonds denied these claims in Heat magazine in July 2006. However, in 2015, these claims were later proven to be accurate by Richard Osman, who confirmed that Hugill was the Banker.

In the revival series by ITV1, the Banker's identity is unknown again, beyond being a male individual. Mulhern revealed in pre-launch interviews that he was asked by the production team if he wanted to know who the Banker was, but declined the request, stating that he "wanted to stay on the side of the player".

== Episodes ==
=== Season overview ===
| Season | Start date | End date | Episodes | Presenter |
|---|---|---|---|---|
Edmonds era (Channel 4)
| 1 | 31 October 2005 | 22 July 2006 | 234 | Noel Edmonds |
| 2 | 28 August 2006 | 13 July 2007 | 278 | Noel Edmonds |
| 3 | 13 August 2007 | 25 July 2008 | 299 | Noel Edmonds |
| 4 | 25 August 2008 | 24 July 2009 | 287 | Noel Edmonds |
| 5 | 24 August 2009 | 25 July 2010 | 288 | Noel Edmonds |
| 6 | 23 August 2010 | 29 July 2011 | 294 | Noel Edmonds |
| 7 | 15 August 2011 | 29 July 2012 | 301 | Noel Edmonds |
| 8 | 30 July 2012 | 4 August 2013 | 314 | Noel Edmonds |
| 9 | 5 August 2013 | 3 August 2014 | 281 | Noel Edmonds |
| 10 | 4 August 2014 | 8 July 2015 | 227 | Noel Edmonds |
| 11a | 21 September 2015 | 6 April 2016 | 126 | Noel Edmonds |
| 11b | 17 October 2016 | 23 December 2016 | 46 (Note: Includes 10 'On Tour' shows, 12 - 23 December 2016.) | Noel Edmonds |
| Total | | | 2,985 | Noel Edmonds |
Mulhern era (ITV1)
| 1 | 20 November 2023 | 15 December 2023 | 20 | Stephen Mulhern |
| 2 | 28 October 2024 | 13 February 2026 | 120 | Stephen Mulhern |
| 3 | 2 November 2026 | TBD | 120 | Stephen Mulhern |
| Total (Note: As of 22 August 2026.) | | | 140 | Stephen Mulhern |

=== Episodes not included in episode count ===
==== Celebrity Deal or No Deal ====
On 8 April 2012, Deal or No Deal started broadcasting celebrity editions of the show.

The celebrity contestants (in order of broadcast) were:

| Ordinal number | Airdate | Contestant | Result | Charity |
|---|---|---|---|---|
Channel 4 era
| 1 | 8 April 2012 | Jimmy Carr | £750 | Helen & Douglas House |
| 2 | 22 April 2012 | Olly Murs | 50p | Brainwave |
| 3 | 29 April 2012 | Sarah Millican | £20,000 | Macmillan Cancer Support |
| 4 | 7 May 2012 | Louis Walsh | £70,000 | ISPCC |
| 5 | 13 May 2012 | Peter Andre | £1,000 | Health Improvement Project Zanzibar |
| 6 | 20 May 2012 | Katie Price | £16,000 | Vision Charity & Autistic Research Institute |
| 7 | 3 June 2012 | McFly | £10,000 | Eyes Alight, WWF, When You Wish Upon A Star |
| 8 | 1 January 2013 | Joan Collins | £15,000 | Shooting Star Chase |
| 9 | 24 March 2013 | Jonathan Ross | £20,000 | Royal Marsden Cancer Charity |
| 10 | 12 May 2013 | JLS | £50,000 | JLS Foundation |
| 11 | 25 August 2013 | Gok Wan | 10p | Kidscape |
| 12 | 4 July 2014 | James Corden | £32,000 | Terrence Higgins Trust |
| 13 | 12 October 2014 | Alan Carr | £41,000 | Stand Up to Cancer |
ITV1 era
| 1 | 17 December 2023 | Michael Owen | £4,000 | Fight for Sight |
| 2 | 7 January 2024 | Simon Gregson | £15,300 | Proud & Loud Arts |
| 3 | 8 December 2024 | Sam Thompson | £16,500 | ADHD UK |
| 4 | 15 December 2024 | Motsi and Oti Mabuse | £11,850 | The Winnie Mabaso Foundation |
| 5 | 28 December 2024 | Katarina Johnson-Thompson | £10,777 | Listening Ear, Alzheimer's Society UK |
| 6 | 7 June 2025 | Alex Brooker | £13,780 | UNICEF |
| 7 | 24 May 2026 | Jill Scott | £12,616 | UNICEF |
| 8 | 25 July 2026 | Guz Khan | £19,710 | Medical Aid for Palestinians |
| 9 | 1 August 2026 | Zoe Ball | £13,300 | St Peter & St James Hospice |
| 10 | 8 August 2026 | Adam and Ryan Thomas | £2,010 | Arthritis UK |
| 11 | 15 August 2026 | Joe Lycett | £11,560 | Tamworth Wellbeing Cancer Support Centre |
| 12 | 22 August 2026 | Katherine Ryan | £2,789 | The Women's Health Information & Support Centre |

===== Channel 4 Mash Up =====
In January 2013, as part of the Channel 4 Mash Up, cast members of 8 Out of 10 Cats featured in a special edition of the show, Sean Lock and Jon Richardson playing, with Jimmy Carr hosting.

| Airdate | Contestants | Result | Charity |
|---|---|---|---|
| 4 January 2013 | Sean Lock and Jon Richardson | £32,000 | Pseudo Obstruction Research Trust and Hospice UK |

===== 10th Birthday Special =====
In September 2015, Noel Edmonds played for charity to mark the show's 10th birthday, with Sarah Millican hosting.

| Airdate | Contestants | Result | Charity |
|---|---|---|---|
| 18 September 2015 | Noel Edmonds | £26,000 | Children's Hospice South West |

Additionally, a "Christmas Stars" special featuring contestant Ian Taylor broadcast in December 2013 is not included in the show's official episode count, according to a statistics board shown in episodes broadcast in 2014. The 2007-8 Christmas Stars specials are, however, included in the official episode count.

== Reception ==
=== Critical reception ===
Columnist A. A. Gill described Deal or No Deal as "like putting heroin in your TV remote". The Guardian's television reviewer Charlie Brooker criticised the in-show implication that there are strategies that can be employed and pointed out that the game premise revolves around plain guessing while calling it "a gameshow based on the Copenhagen interpretation of quantum mechanics".

=== Awards and nominations ===
Deal or No Deal had consistently been the most watched programme in its slot for all UK channels for both daytime and primetime, particularly in the early years of its run. It was named "Daytime Programme of the Year" at the Royal Television Society Awards on 14 March 2006, and "Best Daytime Programme" in the TV Quick Awards on 5 September 2006. The UK version also won the Rose d'Or award for "Best Game Show" at the 2006 Lucerne Television Festival. Edmonds was also nominated in the "Best Entertainment Performance" category at the 2006 BAFTA Television Awards. The show was voted "Best Daytime Programme" at the 2006 National Television Awards. Edmonds was also nominated for "Best Entertainment Presenter" at the same awards.

As of 2 February 2015, the show had given away more than £40,000,000 of prize money.

== Sponsorship ==
The programme had numerous sponsors during its run, including Müller, BT, Jackpotjoy.com, More Than.com, Anadin, The Famous Grouse, All-Bran, HSL Furniture, Tombola Bingo and now Aldi for the ITV run.

=== Product placement ===
In August 2012, the show had undertaken product placement by incorporating the PG Tips logo into its episodes. The logo was added digitally in post-production and appears on the contestants' coffee mugs.

=== Merchandising ===
During the original run of the series, many pieces of merchandise were sold based on the show, including books, video games, tabletop games and DVDs.

Drumond Park released board games, electronic games, card games, and handheld games based on the series, while Mindscape developed video games for the Wii, Nintendo DS and PC, titled Deal or No Deal: The Banker Is Back and Deal or No Deal respectively, all featuring custom voice lines from Edmonds.

A book, The Official Behind the Scenes Guide (ISBN 0-09-192006-X), was published on 26 October 2006 by Ebury. It features interviews with Edmonds, the Banker, and contestants, and has statistics for all contestants' games from season 1. Channel 4 DVD released a DVD TV game on 13 November 2006. The game had original filmed segments in the show's original studio featuring Edmonds as the host and the game has the same format as a show would. A second DVD game subtitled Family Challenge was released on 19 November 2007, featuring cameo appearances from contestants from the 2006/7 season.

In 2015, a quiz mobile app titled Deal or No Deal – Noel's Quiz was released. The app was available on iOS and Android, and was shut down a year later. Many quiz-based Deal or No Deal games appear on a number of pub quiz machines in the UK, as well as Deal or No Deal arcade machines developed by ICE and PlayMechanix.

In 2024, updated merchandise, including a board game, based on the ITV series of the show were developed and sold by Big Sky Games.

== Gambling issues ==
In March 2012, with the series approaching its 2,000th episode and the format now broadcast in over 50 countries, senior Channel 4 executives were to meet with the Gambling Commission, who were preparing to issue new guidance in April 2012 on the implications of the Gambling Act 2005 for broadcasters and according to The Guardian, had concerns with the show. The newspaper claimed the show could be breaking the law as it did not involve any element of skill, with such non-skill games played for profit requiring a gambling licence.
