= The Mole series 2 =

The Mole
- Series 2
- Presented by: Glenn Hugill
- No. of contestants: 10
- Winner: Chris Lintern
- Runner-up: Paul Tregear
- Location: Canada
- The Mole: Tanya Buck
- No. of episodes: 9

Release
- Original network: Channel 5
- Original release: 14 October – 9 December 2001

Season chronology
- ← Previous; Series 1

Series 2 of the British reality game show The Mole was released in 2001, took place in Canada, and was also hosted by Glenn Hugill.

== Contestants ==
Player	Age	Hometown	Occupation
Chris Gallagher	28	Holgate, York	Consultant trainer
Chris Lintern	27	Chapmanslade, Wiltshire	Company director
Dafydd "Daff" Williams	27	Cardiff, Wales	Event co-ordinator
Jim Anderson	40	Kilmarnock, Ayrshire	Garage owner
Karrie Fox	50	Truro, Cornwall	Artist
Mel Brookes	30	Fleet, Hampshire	Information associate
Natalie Gadd	28	Buckhurst Hill, Essex	Retail manager
Paul Tregear	29	Westcliff-on-Sea, Essex	Firefighter
Paula Mason	23	Spennymoor, County Durham	Ground stewardess
Tanya Buck	33	Barnet, Hertfordshire	Fitness instructor

== Execution chart ==
Elimination chart
	1	2	3	4	5	6	7	8 & 9
Chris L.	IN	IN	IN	IN	IN	IN	IN	WINNER
Tanya	IN	IN	IN	IN	IN	IN	IN	MOLE
Paul	IN	IN	IN	IN	IN	IN	IN	OUT
Dafydd	IN	IN	IN	IN	IN	IN	OUT	
Karrie	IN	IN	IN	IN	IN	OUT		
Mel	IN	IN	IN	IN	OUT			
Jim	IN	IN	IN	OUT				
Paula	IN	IN	OUT					
Chris G.	IN	OUT						
Natalie	OUT							

Blue indicates the player won the game
Yellow indicates the player was the mole
Green indicates the player won a free pass
White indicates the player was safe
Red indicates the player scored the lowest on the quiz and was executed

== Episode list ==
=== Episode 1 ===
Episode 1 recap
Mission	Money earned	Possible earnings
Find Glenn	£0	£10,000
Swim, Catch and Keep	£5,000	£5,000
Cabin Key	-£2,500	£0
Cross the Dam	£0	£10,000
Current Kitty	£2,500	£25,000
Execution
Natalie	1st player executed	

Find Glenn: When they get off their transportation, they find a suitcase in their luggage. They open it to find a message from Glenn telling them that he is in their range, and that their challenge is to find him around their location. Each contestant has a two-sided puzzle piece somewhere in their luggage that they need to find. They find the pieces, with Jim under suspicion for not looking in all of his bag. One side of each piece reveals a written clue - telling them to march in geographical order of their hometowns from North to South, while the other is a map to Glenn's location. Also in the pack is a GPS, which points them the correct way, but they have arguments about which way to march. After marching for a while, they find a walkie-talkie that connects them to Glenn who tells them if they break the order in which they are in, they will lose the challenge. They try to organise and finally make a decision about where they should stand. After arriving, it is discovered Paul, Natalie, and Tanya arrived in the wrong order and the money is therefore lost. Glenn tells them that the GPS had a map of the UK on it, which they could have used to work out the correct order of contestants. He then gives each contestant a tube containing a clue to the Mole - telling them not to open it unless given permission to do so and to keep it near them at all times.

Swim, Catch and Keep: Glenn asks for four of the best swimmers - and they pick Paul, Chris, Natalie, and Mel. He then explains that their survival equipment is in waterproof bags in the raging rapids - and their survival in the game could depend on them rescuing it. A list of the items in each pack and their release schedule is on a chart at the rapids, and the contestants must get the bags out of the rapids to keep the things in them. They have one minute to memorise the chart to decide the bags they will keep before the first pack is released. The first release has bear mare, a six-pack of beer, two sleeping bags, and wipes. They missed the wipes and sleeping bags, but got the beer and the bear mare. The second release has two sleeping bags, a tin opener, a bottle of whiskey, and a loo roll. They get everything but the loo roll this time. After two misses, Mel is replaced in the swimming team by Dafydd. The third release contains the pen knife, keys to the log cabin, dried rations, and two more sleeping bags. This bag is critical, as the keys are in it. The pen knife, rations, and the sleeping bags are saved but the keys are lost. In the fourth release, there are five blankets, luxury food, bars of chocolate, and two more sleeping bags. The chocolate, blankets, and sleeping bags are saved. The fifth release has repellent, a tent, a cuddly toy, and five more blankets - and if they don't get the tent, they will be sleeping outside. For this round, Natalie and Paul switch positions but only the blankets are saved. In the final release is a torch, the £5,000 prize money, two sleeping bags, and a bottle of whiskey - of which only the money is saved. After the challenge, Glenn offers them the keys to the cabin for half of the prize money, telling them they cannot expect to survive if they sleep outside due to bear attacks, and they decide to sacrifice £2,500 for the key.

Cross the Dam: In order to earn £10,000, all ten contestants must cross over a very high dam on a high wire while not allowing their heart rate to exceed 130 bpm within one hour. If they cannot cross the wire, they can take a ten-minute penalty. Chris G. goes first and immediately has to wait for his heart rate, before deciding to take a ten-minute penalty to get across. Former fireman Paul goes next and gets across. Next is Carey, who cannot calm down and takes the penalty. Mel is fourth, and after a slow start takes the penalty. Natalie, who is next, quickly gets across the dam as does Paula. Chris L. goes 3 paces, then cannot get his heart rate down and takes the penalty. Fitness instructor Tanya goes next, who stays on for a long time before crossing due to her acrophobia. Dafydd makes it across quickly as does Jim but they exceed their time limit by four minutes - ending the episode with the kitty at £2,500.

After a quiz on details about the identity and actions of the Mole, Natalie is the first to be executed.

=== Episode 2 ===
Episode 2 recap
Mission	Money earned	Possible earnings
Stunt Planes	£10,000	£10,000
Grab the Pucks	£5,000	£5,000
Bomb Defusing	£0	£15,000
Current Kitty	£17,500	£55,000
Execution
Chris G.	2nd player executed	

Stunt Planes: The players must identify a plane stunt that is being performed whilst inside the stunt plane. To earn the £10,000 prize, the team must identify five of the nine stunts being performed. They must also choose their names from pilot call signs. The names are as follows:

  - Chris G. - Sir "Maverick"
  - Chris L. - Sir "Goose"
  - Dafydd - Sir "Iceman"
  - Jim - Sir "Jester"
  - Karrie - Madame "Homer"
  - Paul - Sir "Twirp"
  - Paula - Madame "Twinkle"
  - Mel - Madame "Pookey Bear"
  - Tanya - Madame "Baseball"

Chris L., Jim, Karrie, and Paula correctly identified their stunts. However, Chris G., Dafydd, Mel, and Tanya incorrectly answered. The pressure was on Paul to identify his stunt (which was "Corkscrew Twist"). He answered right, winning the team £10,000.

Grab the Pucks: The player must are tied to bungee ropes which to connected to a metal ring. The ring is in the centre of a pole. The players must ice skate to retrieve an ice puck on a pole a few feet in front of them. If the ring touches the pole, then the team loses a life. If all 9 lives are lost or if 20 minutes runs out, the game is lost. However, if all the players can retrieve their pucks and return to the centre blue circle, they will win £5,000.

Mel fails at her first attempt, and Chris L. gets his puck. Paula gets hers, but the alarm is almost triggered. Mel tries again, but falls and triggers the alarm, and losing a life for the team. Mel keeps trying (but falls along with Chris L. in the process) and finally gets her puck. As Paul is nearing his puck, Karrie and Mel fall over, nearly losing a life. After recovering, Paul gets his puck. Jim retrieves his puck with no difficulty. Karrie, having trouble to get her puck, is assisted by Dafydd and grabs her puck. Dafydd then gets his puck, but was deadly close to sounding the alarm. Chris G. then gets his puck. Tanya is assisted by Chris G. falling in the process, but succeeding. Glenn almost took away the prize money for assisting players, but the mission was about teamwork and he was feeling generous.

Bomb Defusing: The players (dressed up James Bond style) had to race across a field without being shot by snipers. If shot, the player is out. Those who make it to the other side will need to defuse a bomb by answering brain-teasers and correctly performing the right procedure. If they get a procedure wrong, or the timer runs out, the bomb explodes.

Chris L., Dafydd, Jim, and Mel were shot by the snipers. Chris G., Paul, Paula, Tanya, and much to the other player's surprises, Karrie, made it past the snipers. Chris G. and Tanya worked on one side of the bomb while Karrie, Paul, and Paula worked on the other. They were close to completely defusing the bomb, but Chris G. and Tanya performed a wrong procedure causing the bomb to explode and losing them the prize money.

At the execution, Chris G. was the second to see a red screen and be sent home.

=== Episode 3 ===
Episode 3 recap
Mission	Money earned	Possible earnings
Tube Check	-£1,000	£0
Speed Boats	£5,000	£5,000
Green Glass Bowl Protection	£0	£10,000
Ball Drop	£0	£10,000
Current Kitty	£21,500	£80,000
Execution
Paula	3rd player executed	

Tube Check: At 1:00 am, Glenn wakes the remaining contestants up and instructs them to meet him in the lobby. At the lobby, Chris L. didn't have his tube from the first episode. The team was penalized 1,000 pounds.

Speed Boats: At 10:00 am the same day, the contestants take a trip to the mountains. Their task is to transfer one team of four to the others' banana boat and vice versa. They have one hour to complete this task. They were able to complete the task and gained £5,000.

Green Glass Bowl Protection: At a cowboy ranch, the contestants are instructed by Glenn flying overhead in a helicopter that they must protect a glass bowl from snipers with green paintballs. The glass bowl has green gel and green tubes in it. The contestants are given paintball equipment with yellow paintballs. If the contestants are able to protect the glass bowl until sunrise the following morning, they can wins £10,000 for the pot.

In the first armed conflict, the team was able to defeat one of the opponents' commandos, bringing them to seven. After some silence in the field, the team had to send someone to do the required patrol of the perimeter - where Karrie was easily shot down after not listening to Chris. The team managed to defeat another commando right after Karrie's defeat. After the commandos changed tactics, they fired on Paula (who is hit by a yellow paintball) and Jim who are covering a bunker near the back - meaning that there are six remaining commandos to the team's five remaining players. Dafydd and Tanya are shot next, leaving the team with only three defending the bowl. In the final assault, Paul and Daffyd are shot - leaving just Chris in the central bunker. The team fail the mission as the Commandos tossing the glass bowl to the ground - losing them the money.

Ball Drop: Immediately after the Bowl Protection Mission briefing is over, Glenn tells them that their next mission is next. One person must ride an exercise bike at all times until 8:00 am (roughly 2.5 hours elapsed time), while the others clean the mess from the previous mission. The rider can be changed at any time, but no-one is allowed to ride for more than ten minutes consecutively. At 8:00 am, the contestants enter a barn where a metal ball is attached to the magnet - which is controlled by a battery that was being charged by the exercise bike. When the battery runs out, the ball will drop - and all they have to do to earn £10,000 is catch the ball when it drops. While they are waiting for the ball to drop, they must stand on Mole sheets. The ball dropped during a transfer of watchers, and the money was lost.

At the execution, Paula became the third victim of the Mole as she received the red screen.

=== Episode 4 ===
Episode 4 recap
Mission	Money earned	Possible earnings
Beat the Train	£10,000	£10,000
Fake Arrest	£10,000	£10,000
Cliff Jumping	£10,000	£10,000
Current Kitty	£51,500	£110,000
Free Passes
-	Chris L. and Jim failed to beat the train	
Execution
Jim	4th player executed	

Beat the Train: Two players (Chris L. and Jim) are to use bicycles to beat a train containing the other 5 players (Dafydd, Karrie, Mel, Paul, and Tanya) who must use newspapers to identify 5 mystery people. The players must find the people's photographs and full names. Every correct answer results in a gain of 2 kilometres. For each incorrect answer, the train will not move. If Chris L. and Jim can make to the finish line before the others, one of them will win a free pass.

The train beat both Chris L. and Jim (who both decided to refuse the free pass). No free passes were won, but the group earned £10,000.

Fake Arrest: At first, the players are arrested for stolen property (the vans). But then they are told that they are under investigation for "tampering with their tubes". The tubes, given on episode 1, contained a piece of light-sensitive photographic paper. Any player's paper that does not develop will be allowed to walk away. The players' papers who does will be locked in cells. Inside each cell is a three-part mathematical brain-teaser. The players who answer their question correctly will be released, while the ones who don't remained locked. The players who didn't open their tubes in the first place were given a cheque for £1,000 each. They could keep the check for themselves or give the cheques back before the dinner ends to release one of their friends (one cheque per friend). For any player that stays in the cell until midnight, the group will be fined £2,000 (with the exception of Chris L., who failed to produce his tube, and his penalty is £5,000 if he fails to escape). If everyone is released, £10,000 will be won.

Dafydd, Karrie, and Mel were found not guilty at the start. Paul and Tanya succeeded at solving the brain-teaser, and Chris L. and Jim failed. Dafydd, Karrie, and Mel decided to use their cheques to bail their friends out. Therefore, Chris L. and Jim were released, and the group won £10,000. (It is also revealed that Dafydd returned his check for nothing, while Karrie turned hers in to free Jim, and Mel turned hers in to free Chris L.)

Cliff Jumping: The players are sequestered separately to cliff height of their choice. One cliff is 20 feet, another is 30 feet, and the last is 40 feet. To win the players must have a combined jump height of 230 feet or more to win. The players are not allowed to tell other players about what height they will jump at, doing so will result in disqualification.

Chris L., Dafydd, Jim, Karrie, Mel, and Paul jumped from the 40-foot cliff. Tanya, who is Aquaphobic and Acrophobic jumped from 20 feet, raising suspicion. Nevertheless, the players won, with combined total of 260 feet.

=== Episode 5 ===
Episode 5 recap
Mission	Money earned	Possible earnings
Chase	£0	£5,000
Cliff Climb	£0	£5,000
Egg Carry	£0	£20,000
Current Kitty	£51,500	£140,000
Free Passes
Tanya	Successfully feigned injury and was assisted to the finishing point.	
Execution
Mel	5th player executed	

Chase: The team are asked to nominate the two people who they consider to be the weakest members of the team, mentally and physically - and they choose Tanya and Karrie, who are sent off on a challenge immediately. Using a set of directions, they have to drive to a given location, taking photos along the way to allow the other team members to find them later. They are also asked to pose for a photo in which they shield their eyes from the sun's glare, a photo which viewers are told is very important. The challenge is not against the clock, however, they are told their finishing time will be crucial later.

Once they arrive and call Glenn, he confirms their finishing time as 57 minutes and 34 seconds. The rest of the team are then tasked with tracking them down using only the photos that were taken earlier, within their 1 hour 27 minutes and 34 seconds - giving them an extra half an hour to complete the challenge. If they succeed, they will win £5,000. They seek help from various locals, although they are not allowed to use any additional resources (for example, maps). After reuniting, Glenn informs them that they arrived exactly one minute over their time limit, so fail the challenge. He also reveals the reason for the 'eye shielding' photo, which the team paid no attention to. If they had looked behind the sun visor, they would have found detailed directions to the location. He also added that due to both parties breaking the speed limit during their respective parts of the challenge, they would have failed regardless.

Cliff Climb: When the team come down for breakfast the next morning, they find an envelope on the table. As the person who picked it up, Paul is told to meet Glenn at reception and leave a second envelope for the rest of the team. All that is revealed to them is that they will be taking a speedboat journey to their next challenge. When Paul meets up with Glenn, he is taken to a National Park where he is presented with a 150-foot cliff face, which the rest of the team will be challenged with climbing. The first section has ropes to assist them, the second is a free-hand climb. Paul's job is to predict what each of his friends will achieve - getting all the way to the top, getting to the end of the rope section, or failing entirely. Their results must much exactly with his predictions for the team to win £5,000.

Predictions and Results
Contestant	Prediction	Result
Karrie	Complete the ropes section only	Completed the ropes section
Dafydd	Complete both sections	Completed both sections
Mel	Complete both sections	Completed the ropes section only
Chris	Complete the ropes section only	Completed both sections
Tanya	Complete the ropes section only	Completed the ropes section only

Paul was correct in only three out of his five predictions, resulting in the challenge being lost.

Egg Carry: In this challenge, the contestants had to carry 18 eggs between them, while traversing rough terrain. They would win £1,000 for each egg making the journey intact, with a bonus of £2,000 for delivering all 18 eggs, meaning potential winnings of £20,000. Tanya, the last contestant to climb in the previous challenge was told by Glenn that she would have an opportunity in this challenge to win a free pass to the next episode as an act of revenge for being voted one of the team's weakest members. To get it, she would have to feign injury or illness and be assisted across the finish line by at least one of the others. Towards the end, Tanya claimed that she had twisted her ankle, with Chris and Dafydd helping her the rest of the way. Despite all 18 eggs making it without being broken, Glenn revealed what Tanya had done and declared the challenge lost.

=== Episode 6 ===
Episode 6 recap
Mission	Money earned	Possible earnings
Release the Dogs	£10,000	£10,000
Bear Witch	£10,000	£10,000
Deaf, Dumb and Blind	£0	£5,000
Current Kitty	£71,500	£165,000
Free Passes
-	Karrie was unable to scare her teammates out of the tent by pretending to be a bear.	
Execution
Karrie	6th player executed	

Karrie was elected as the weakest member of the group physically, so was given the opportunity to sit out the first two challenges of this episode.

Release the Dogs: The four contestants head into the forest where they go on the run as fugitives, dressed in boiler suits and with their legs restrained, while being pursued by attack dogs. They have a five-minute head start on the dogs and their handlers, and may run until the dogs get close enough to them to attack and their handlers shout 'Stop!'. Their ultimate aim is to find two halves of an air horn, assemble and sound it to win £10,000. Three of the contestants are caught, while the fourth, Paul, puts enough distance between himself and the dogs, finds the air horn and sounds it, winning the challenge. It is revealed in the final episode that he managed to snap his manacle restraints, thereby making the task significantly easier.

Bear Witch: The contestants had to sound the air horn from 'Release the Dogs' within two minutes of 6 am the next morning. However, an egg timer, with each turn lasting 2.5 minutes is their only means of telling the time. The contestants work in shifts for several hours, while the others sleep, using 24 twigs to track the passing of each hour, moving them in similar fashion to a cricket umpire moving stones. Given their surroundings, and the risk of bear attacks, they can be rescued by shouting 'Clear the dugouts'.

Meanwhile Karrie has been offered the opportunity to win a free pass, by pretending to be a bear and successfully scaring the other four out of the tent. She fails in her mission and despite her unexpected visit distracting the rest of the team from monitoring the passing of the time, they manage to sound the air horn at 6:01 am and win £10,000.

Deaf, Dumb and Blind: This challenge begins in the headmaster's study of a local school, with Glenn posing as the school principal. Firstly he asks for a volunteer who 'feels ready for an individual responsibility.' Dafydd puts himself forward. The remaining 4 split into two teams, who are sent to different parts of the school and Dafydd, who is blindfolded with a head-mounted camera is tasked with finding them. To do this, he must locate various clues which will tell him where the keys are required to unlock the doors to the classrooms in which his teammates are sitting. He must find both teams within 30 minutes for them to win £5,000.

Team A (Tanya and Karrie) can see where Dafydd is going via a TV monitor which is linked to his camera. They must use this information to relay non-verbal instructions to Team B. They can use a radio transmitter to issue verbal commands to Dafydd, but are unable to see him. Team A also know that Dafydd has to look for clues which will tell them where to look for the keys required to unlock the two classrooms that his teammates are located in. Team B however do not know this.

Dafydd does manage to find one of the classrooms in which his teammates are located, but is unable to unlock the classroom door without the key. The 30 minutes elapse before both teams are located and the challenge is therefore lost.

=== Episode 7 ===
Episode 7 recap
Mission	Money earned	Possible earnings
Roll Call	£-500	£-2,000
Hostage Negotiations	£0	£5,000
Beat the Locals	£0	£5,000
Heli-bombing	£0	£10,000
Current Kitty	£71,000	£185,000
Free Passes
-	Dafydd and Paul both selected the Free Pass in the Hostage Negotiation challenge.	
Execution
Dafydd	7th player executed	

Roll Call: The contestants were woken at 6:30 am and told to report to the hotel reception within 5 minutes. A fine would be imposed for any person failing to make it down within the allotted time. Chris, Dafydd and Tanya all made it on time, however Paul was 9 minutes late, resulting in the team losing £500 of their prize money.

Hostage Negotiations The first challenge was in two parts. Initially, Glenn took the four contestants individually to a hotel room, where they were handcuffed and blind-folded, and told to remain there before his return in two minutes. On the wall of the room was a Scrabble board, with the tiles spelling out various words related to the game. They were told under no circumstances to move or remove their blindfolds. Tanya and Dafydd both removed their blindfolds and got up to look at the board, Chris remained sitting on the bed, while taking notes and Paul stayed seated and did not remove his blindfold. In the end, there was no penalty for breaking the rules and the key section of the Scrabble board were four words in the middle - The Mole Is Male.

All four contestants were then taken to a car and driven to a mountain top. They were presented with four suitcases, each with different contents. One was empty, one contained 3 free answers for the penultimate quiz, one contained £1,000 and the other, a free pass to the final. To win £5,000, each contestant had to choose a different suitcase, and each would also win the contents of the case they chose. So for the first and only time in either series, it was possible for a contestant to win a free pass at the same time as the team winning the prize money. If two or more contestants chose the same suitcase, the challenge would be lost, but if any suitcase was chosen by just one person, they would still win its contents.

Each contestant was given one minute to negotiate with each of the others. Although there were disagreements, it was eventually decided that each contestant would opt for the case they were standing in front of when the rules of the challenge were explained. Things however, did not go according to plan, with Paul, who it was assumed would take the £1,000, chose the Free Pass instead, explaining that his decision was in the interest of fairness, since if one person was exempt from the final execution, the other two contestants would be at a significant disadvantage.

Game Outcome
Contestant	Suitcase Chosen
Dafydd	Free Pass
Chris	3 Free Answers
Paul	Free Pass
Tanya	Empty Case

Beat the Locals This challenge took place at the Apple Bowl in Kelowna. Glenn asked for a volunteer who was 'excellent at taking instructions', with Paul stepping forward. The drum major then explained to Paul how to lead a pipe band, including the commands and mace signals used. He was then tasked with passing these on the first of his teammates, who would then pass it on to the next until finally all four had been briefed, but only with what the person before had remembered. Paul sat in the spectator stands, while his teammates led three different bands across the field. They had to reach a certain point before the band finished playing their three songs. The music was over before the bands got across the field and the £5,000 was lost.

Heli-bombing Each contestant sat in a helicopter which flew over a lake. On the same lake, a boat, pulling a target was driven below them. Their task was to guide the helicopter pilot and when they were confident the target was directly below it, drop a 'bomb' onto it. 2 of the 4 contestants were required to hit the target to win £10,000, however Tanya was the only one who managed it successfully. Glenn explained that the boat followed the same pattern for all four contestants, going straight and then weaving, then straight and weaving etc., before explaining when exactly each of the contestants had chosen to drop their bomb.

The final execution took place later that evening - where Daffyd was executed. As he departed, viewers were informed of the birth of his first child in October 2001.

=== Episode 8 ===
Episode 8 recap
Mission	Money earned	Possible earnings
Gold Panning / Photo Sort	£5,000	£5,000
Find the One Horse	-£2,500	£5,000
Lumberjacking	-£5,000	£10,000
Foreign Language Speaking	£10,000	£10,000
Reach the Final Destination	£10,000	£10,000
Current Kitty	£88,500	£225,000
Winner
Chris	Won the £88,500 kitty and gave Paul, the runner up, a share of the prize money.	
Mole
Tanya	Revealed as the Mole	

The episode began on a luxury paddle streamer in Penticton. There, Glenn explained the format of the episode. The final would take place 300 miles away and their challenge was to reach its location within 7 hours and make the journey on a single tank of fuel. Extra fuel would be provided but at a cost of £1,000 of prize money per gallon. They would also be stopping at several locations along the way where they would face a series of mini-challenges, but being fined half of the prize money on offer from the kitty for each mini-challenge that they fail. Each location will also give them an envelope containing the instructions for their next challenge.

Gold Panning: The first envelope contains 21 photos which they recognise as locations of all the games they have played. At the Henley Heritage Museum they get a brief lesson on how to pan for gold. They then must use the techniques they’ve been taught to find instructions on what to do with their photos. The first tells them to split the photos into two piles - games won and lost. The second is to place only the games they have won in chronological order. They succeed in doing this and win £5,000.

Find the 'One Horse': The second envelope contained instructions on how to reach the next location - Princeton, a ‘one-horse’ town. There, the challenge was to find the one horse. They would receive three clues, one at the start of the challenge, one five minutes later and one ten minutes later. They would then have a further five minutes to locate the horse. They were allowed to ask local people for directions to locations, but not to ask where the horse was. After struggling to make sense of the clues and looking round various locations for further clues, they spot a horse box. Chris asks a passer by where ‘the contents of the trailer’ are and they are directed to the bar. They find the horse with 18 seconds of their time left, but fail the challenge because Chris asked for directions to the horse.

Lumberjacking: On the next leg of their journey, the contestants had to discuss what they would do with the prize money if they won. At the next destination - Lightning Lakes in Manning Park - their challenge was to saw clean through a large wooden log, before a local chainsaw artist could carve a mole. They could use one of three tools to cut the log, with the prize money depending on the tool they selected - £3,000 for a two-handed saw, £5,000 for an axe and £10,000 for a one-handed saw. They choose the one-handed saw and fail to cut the log in two within the timeframe, subsequently losing £5,000.

Foreign Language Speaking: With now having less money than they started with, things have taken a dampener, however the team press on. In the next envelope is a language learning CD. Before reaching their next destination, Hope, they must master several Korean words and phrases, specifically how to ask 'what coloured box should we open?' and the words for various colours. At a Korean restaurant in Hope, they must ask the owner "What coloured box should we open?" and he will reply using one of the phrases they had previously learned. They must then identify the correct box, which will contain the £10,000 prize money. They are allowed to ask the owner the question again if they need confirmation of his answer, but they must not converse in any other language (apart from between each other). Tanya asks the question and from the owner's answer, Paul correctly identifies the green box is the one that contains the prize money.

With their prize fund total now at £78,500, the team's final challenge is to reach the finish point at Grouse Mountain, Vancouver within what is left of their 7-hour time limit. They are short of time, low on fuel and unfortunately for them, the final few miles are an uphill climb. Nevertheless, they arrive without having to refuel and with 4 minutes to spare. This awards them their final £10,000, making their final total £88,500.

=== Episode 9: The Sabotages ===
Down the Mountain: Tanya, who lived near Paul, let Paul make the decision of placing himself, Natalie, and Tanya in the wrong positions. Therefore, the players found Glenn in time, but they were in the wrong order.

River Bags: Tanya genuinely told everyone she was aquaphobic, and became the person to keep other players from drifting down the river by using a rope. She kept pulling the rope on her teammates (Dafydd and Mel) too hard, therefore preventing them from getting any bags except one. This was a risky sabotage, as Tanya knew the two would feel her pulling on them. Two of the important bags containing the tent and the key to the log cabin she purposely prevented the team from getting to ensure that the team would be forced to relinquish half of their prize money for the key to the log cabin. Notably, her team only retrieved one of the bags.

Over the Wire: Tanya had prepared extra-strong coffee, which everyone but her drank. So when the players crossed the wire, they couldn't keep their heart rate down and had to stop. Tanya then stayed on the wire long enough (genuinely saying she was acrophobic) to make the team lose the challenge.

Stunt Planes: Tanya purposely answered her stunt incorrectly with "Corkscrew Twist". However, the team still won the money.

Fake Arrest: Tanya purposely opened her tube, and became one of four people to solve the brain-teaser. However, Dafydd, Karrie, and Mel returned their cheques (much to the producer's surprise) and Paul answered the question correctly. So Tanya answered her question correctly, knowing that the mission was won no matter what she did.

Tanya's Briefings: In season one, the Mole (David Buxton) would have late-night meetings with the producers about the challenges. This season, the producer would use and talk to Tanya via the headphones on her CD player to tell her about the challenges. He would then request Tanya to give him a sign (such as flicking her hotel room lights on and off twice) to confirm that she got his message.

Bomb Defusing: Tanya blew the bomb up by turning the knob on the control panel the wrong way (unknown to the other players), but the bomb blew up more quickly than she thought, so the look on her face when the explosion happened was for real.

Boat Jumping: Similar to "Over the Wire", Tanya had prepared suntan oil which she, Dafydd and other contestants used. The oil caused the players to lose their grip and slip during the challenge, causing fatigue and wasted time. However, the plan worked too well - because the players kept slipping too often, the water eventually washed the oil off and the players won just on time.

Commando Fortress: Tanya used a secret code word, "Listen", to tell the "terrorists" where everyone was. In the confusion, she purposely shot Paula. The team was easily shot down and the bowl was destroyed.

The Ball Drop: Tanya had biked very hard and long to charge the car battery long enough so when the ball did drop, the players were too tired to catch it.

Cliff Jumping: The producers thought all the men would jump at 40 feet, and all the women would jump at 20 feet. But they were shocked when Karrie and Mel jumped at 40 feet. So Tanya, who jumped at 20 feet looked suspicious.

Cliff Climbing: The producer secretly talked to Tanya by using a microphone while Tanya listened on her earphone and CD player (everyone thought she was listening to her favorite CD). He gave her Paul's predictions; she made sure enough people would do what Paul had not predicted, losing the challenge.

Egg Carry: This is Tanya's most blatant sabotage - Tanya was to receive a free pass by faking an injury and being physically assisted over the finish line. Therefore the team wouldn't win any money, but she would get a free pass. However, she wasn't told beforehand of the large amount of money the challenge was worth, which led her to have second thoughts. Tanya decided to fake an injury, but it was very cheesy and lost the £20,000. Tanya broke down afterward.

Dog-gone Chase: Tanya received essential oils from the producer. She poured some on a tissue and placed it in her pocket. Before the mission, she made as much physical contact with the other players by touching the oil and then them. The oil was to help the dogs find the players, therefore losing the mission. However, Paul unexpectedly found and sounded the air horn and won the money for the group.

Bearwitch: This time, Karrie was doing the sabotage for Tanya. As Tanya did little to help keep track of time, Karrie pretended to be a bear in order to scare the players into forfeiting the mission by saying "Clear the dugouts", and win a free pass. Although the players were more than 2 minutes different from the actual time, they somehow managed to sound the air-horn within one minute of 6:00 AM. The producer thought they cheated, but couldn't find any evidence.

Blind, Deaf, and Dumb: Tanya mouthed instructions to Chris L. and Paul as she was gesturing, breaking the rules. However, Chris L.'s and Paul's refusal to listen to Karrie and Tanya as well as Dafydd's yelling, was more suspicious.

Beat the Locals: Tanya purposely left an instruction out when she was teaching Chris L. She then slowed down her band enough so that she and Chris L. didn't finish when the 3 songs were done. Suspicion fell on Paul for placing Chris L. and Tanya in the wrong order.

Negotiation: This time, Paul did the sabotage for Tanya. Tanya couldn't get anyone to pick a certain briefcase and grew angry. But then, Dafydd and Paul chose the same briefcase, so suspicion fell on Paul.

Heli-bombing: Tanya begged the producers to let her play for real, as she felt she was being sidetracked by the men since she was the only woman left. Out of the four, only Tanya scored, easing suspicion on her.

==== Hidden clues ====
- Last series, the first words of each episode confirmed that David was the Mole. This year, the first and second words were important as they spelt out two sentences - "This time not first words, but second initially" and "Is there some trick and no-one your answer". The first sentence directs you towards the second words - the initials of which spell out "IT'S TANYA".
- In Episode 2 during the stunt plane challenge, Glenn stated that "The mole was in a spin" once the challenge had been lost. Tanya's stunt was a spin. Tanya also purposely chose "Baseball" as her call sign, alluding to the fact that the final test and unveiling of the Mole would take place in a baseball stadium.
- In the ice hockey challenge, the contestants were told that the shirt numbers related to episode numbers as there was no shirt number 1 (as Natalie had already been eliminated). The only person guaranteed to be in episode 8, the finale, is the Mole, so Tanya wore shirt 8.
- In the note left in the cabin inviting them to dinner, the word's "...the mole is included in it. Any additional information...". The mole is included in iT ANY Additional information.
- While waiting for the ball to drop in episode 3, the message read:

"Although I may be
taking money from you
in the end you'll see
the mole is okay. OK?"
The end of each line is: be, you, see, K - B U C K. The mole's surname.

- When playing the train game, Tanya's newspapers had a fake obituary visible of David Buxton, the previous UK Mole.
- Tanya stated during the interrogation game when she was questioned about the tube that it had not been "exposed". This meant she knew what was coming, and therefore, was the Mole.
- During the mathematical challenge, the code "A=1, B=2, C=3, etc..." gave the following answers to the puzzles: "201 142 51". When re-arranged as 20, 1, 14, 25, 1 and using the same key to turn this back into letters, it spells TANYA.
- A very cryptic clue was that when Tanya was sitting in the jail cell, she was drumming her fingers together. In Morse code, the drumming spelt "Mole".
- In Episode 5, four static clocks were seen on the wall. In semaphore, the hands spelt out BUCK, Tanya's surname.
- The elimination jeep always had the same air freshener - a dollar bill or 'buck' - revealing the name they needed if they wanted to avoid taking the ride home. However, when this Jeep was used in challenges, Paul always insisted on ripping the air freshener down, not realising its significance.
- In episode 7, the Scrabble board stated "The Mole is Male", effectively removing Tanya from being the Mole. However, it was clearly seen that she went into the room first, and the Scrabble board was never shown until after she had removed her blindfold. This is because as soon as the room was empty, she removed the "f" and "e" to make it seem like the Mole is male. If the letters were replaced, it would show 2 new words forming downwards, if and sedate. She is also shown holding those tiles later in the episode.
- Tanya stated during the video diary in Episode 7, "I've been playing the Mole since day 1".
- There were also seven clues linking Tanya to James Bond:
  - In Episode 8, she always received the envelope marked "For Your Eyes Only
  - In Episode 5, she stated the cliff jump scared "The Living Daylights" out of her.
  - Tanya often wore a cap with an "I" in gold, or a "GoldenEye".
  - In Episode 4, when she was arrested, a Thunderball lottery ticket can be seen in her bag.
  - In Episode 3, Tanya was wearing a "Jaws" t-shirt, Jaws being the villain in 2 Bond films.
  - In Episode 6, she stated she "felt like I was gonna blow, felt like I was gonna lose my temper". The middle of this sentence sounded like "Blofeld", another Bond villain.
  - In Episode 2, in the video diary, she stated "either it's a con or 'es the mole", with the middle sounding like (Sean) Connery, who played the first James Bond.

== Ratings ==
Official episode viewing figures are from BARB.

Episode no.	Airdate	Viewers (millions)	Channel 5 weekly ranking
1	14 October 2001	—N/a	—N/a
2	21 October 2001	—N/a	—N/a
3	28 October 2001	—N/a	—N/a
4	4 November 2001	—N/a	—N/a
5	11 November 2001	—N/a	—N/a
6	18 November 2001	—N/a	—N/a
7	25 November 2001	1.08	26
8	2 December 2001	1.13	26
9	9 December 2001	0.93	30
