= Rusin =

Rusin is an alternate transliteration for Rusyn.

Rusin may also refer to:

- Rusín, a village and municipality in the Moravian-Silesian Region, Czech Republic
- Rusin (surname), a surname
- Rūsiņš of Satekle (died 1212), Latgalian duke
- 26390 Rušin, an asteroid

== See also ==
- Russin (disambiguation)
- Rusyn (disambiguation)
