= Million Dollar Secret =

American television reality game show

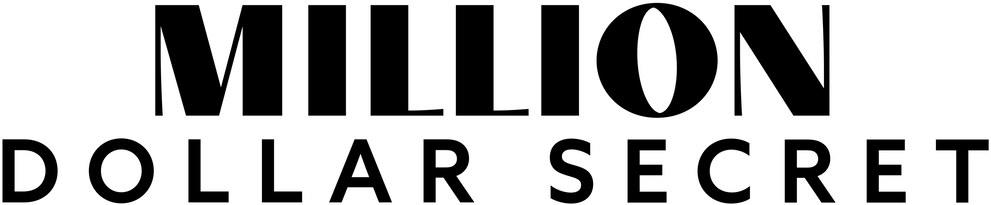
- Genre: Reality game show
- Created by: Glenn Hugill
- Presented by: Peter Serafinowicz
- Country of origin: United States
- Original language: English
- No. of seasons: 2
- No. of episodes: 16

Production
- Executive producer: Charles Wachter
- Production locations: Kelowna, British Columbia, Canada
- Running time: 45–60 minutes
- Production company: Wheelhouse Entertainment

Original release
- Network: Netflix
- Release: March 26, 2025 – present

Million Dollar Secret is an American reality game show streaming on Netflix, which premiered on March 26, 2025 and is hosted by British comedian Peter Serafinowicz.

The series features a group of contestants who stay at a luxurious lakeside estate as they play, with one of whom is secretly awarded the $1,000,000 grand prize at the start of the game. The objective for the "millionaire" is to keep their identity hidden while the other contestants attempt to uncover and eliminate the "millionaire", so that they can become the "millionaire". The last player remaining is the millionaire who wins the game and the prize. The show incorporates elements of strategy, deception, and social deduction, drawing comparisons to other reality series like The Traitors and The Mole.

It was renewed for a second season, which premiered on April 15, 2026. In September 2026, it was renewed for a third season featuring celebrities and reality TV alumni.

== Format ==
A group of contestants reside together in a luxurious lakeside estate known as "The Stag," located at Château Okanagan in Kelowna, British Columbia, Canada. On the first day, each player is randomly given a case — one of which contains $1,000,000. The contestant who finds it becomes the "Millionaire" and must conceal their identity for the duration of the game.

The remaining contestants, known as "Hunters," aim to determine who is secretly holding the prize money. At the end of each episode, players vote to "lock out" the person they most suspect. If the Millionaire is eliminated, the money is re-hidden in a new box and the game continues — this is known as "The Transfer."

During their stay, the Millionaire receives secret agendas at the start of each new day - secret missions that they must undertake during their stay. If they complete the agenda, they receive a game advantage, while some agendas give the Millionaire a penalty if they fail to complete the agenda. Occasionally, other players may be given a Secret Agenda.

Throughout the game, players participate in trust-based challenges and alliance-building exercises. Winners of the challenges can enter the "trophy room" where one of them receives a clue about the current millionaire. In the evening, the contestants gather at the "Elimination dinner", where they vote for who they think is the Millionaire and the one with the most votes is eliminated. After only three contestants are left in the game, the Final Challenge is held, giving the top 2 the ability to swap any two boxes. After the final swap, the person with the money in their box is the winner and leaves "The Stag" with $1,000,000.

The show's format rewards emotional intelligence and psychological deception. Critics have compared it to other social-strategy reality shows such as The Traitors and The Mole (a series whose British version was previously hosted by MDS creator Glenn Hugill), but with a reversal of incentives: instead of striving to win the money, one player already has it — and must keep it.

== Episodes ==
Season	Contestants	Episodes	Originally released		Winner
Season	Contestants	Episodes	First released	Last released	Winner
1	12	8	March 26, 2025	April 9, 2025	Cara Kies
2	14	8	April 15, 2026	April 29, 2026	Nick Pellecchia

=== Season 1 (2025) ===
No. overall	No. in season	Title	Original release date
1	1	"Instant Millionaire"	March 26, 2025
2	2	"The Five Suspects"	March 26, 2025
3	3	"Going to Hell on a Scholarship"	March 26, 2025
4	4	"Hot Seat for Three"	April 2, 2025
5	5	"The Kill Shot"	April 2, 2025
6	6	"911, Misdemeanor, Handcuffs"	April 2, 2025
7	7	"The Tale of Two Sisters"	April 9, 2025
8	8	"Get Rich or Lie Trying"	April 9, 2025

=== Season 2 (2026) ===
No. overall	No. in season	Title	Original release date
9	1	"Millionaire Mind Games"	April 15, 2026
10	2	"Million Dollar Hat Trick"	April 15, 2026
11	3	"Troubled Waters"	April 15, 2026
12	4	"1999 Problems"	April 22, 2026
13	5	"A Silent Assassin"	April 22, 2026
14	6	"House of Dummies"	April 22, 2026
15	7	"Killer Croquet"	April 29, 2026
16	8	"Lie Hard"	April 29, 2026

== Production ==
Million Dollar Secret was filmed over several weeks in late 2024 at Château Okanagan, a sprawling waterfront estate in Kelowna, British Columbia, Canada. The 44-acre property, referred to in the show as "The Stag," features luxury accommodations, a private dock, panoramic lake views, and multiple outdoor gathering spaces that served as key locations for challenges and vote ceremonies.

The series was produced by Wheelhouse Entertainment. The series was created by Glenn Hugill. The Executive Producer and showrunner was Charles Wachter. The production reportedly emphasized secrecy even during filming — with cast members unaware of who received the $1,000,000 prize until the first box-opening scene was filmed.

The show was shot using a combination of handheld cameras and drones to capture intimate moments and sweeping aerial shots, giving it both a documentary and cinematic feel. Editing focused on heightening suspense in each episode.

== Reception ==
Million Dollar Secret received mostly positive reviews from critics, who praised its psychological complexity and premise, while noting its similarities to other deception-based reality formats.

Stuart Heritage of The Guardian described it as "a shameless but entertaining rip-off of The Traitors," adding that "you won't be able to get enough of it." He complimented host Peter Serafinowicz's "dry charm" and the show's suspenseful editing.

On Netflix's official blog *Tudum*, the show was billed as "a psychological thriller disguised as a social experiment," emphasizing the tension created by the hidden Millionaire twist and trust-based gameplay.

Audience response has been more enthusiastic. The show debuted in Netflix's global top 10 for English-language TV during its premiere week and quickly became a talking point across social media platforms, where fans speculated about the Millionaire's identity and strategy.

On Rotten Tomatoes, the series holds a 83% critic score and a 91% audience rating. Reviewers noted the show's strengths in casting and production quality, though some criticized the voting mechanics as predictable.

Some comparisons were also drawn to The Mole and The Circle, though critics noted Million Dollar Secret distinguishes itself by making one contestant an instant millionaire — flipping the usual competitive arc into one of concealment and survival.

== See also ==
Similar shows

- Fortune Hotel
- The Mole
- The Traitors
  - The Traitors UK
  - The Traitors US
    - The Traitors: New Blood
- Survivor

General

- Social deduction game
