= 5 Gold Rings =

British game show

- Title card
- Genre: Game show
- Created by: Glenn Hugill; John de Mol
- Presented by: Phillip Schofield
- Country of origin: United Kingdom
- Original language: English
- No. of series: 4
- No. of episodes: 24

Production
- Running time: 60 minutes (inc. adverts)
- Production company: Possessed

Original release
- Network: ITV
- Release: 5 March 2017 – 6 December 2020

5 Gold Rings is a British game show that aired on ITV from 5 March 2017 to 6 December 2020. It was hosted by Phillip Schofield. It is based on the Dutch game show 5 Golden Rings, with the first series being filmed on the same set in the Netherlands and the second through fourth series at BBC Elstree Centre in London. An app had also been released, so viewers can play along with the show.

== Gameplay ==
=== Overview ===
Two teams of two contestants each compete through five rounds to build up separate prize banks. At the start of each round, the teams choose one member to play. A picture is displayed on a large circular LED screen set into the studio floor, and the contestant has 30 seconds to place a gold ring on a spot named by the host. Successfully doing so (defined as having any portion of the correct spot within the inner circumference of the ring) adds money to the team's bank. In each successive round, the ring size decreases and the money at stake increases. The non-participating teammate may offer advice as desired.

Examples of questions include:

- Given an unlabelled map of Scotland, mark the location of Loch Ness.
- Given an unlabelled timeline from 1901 to 2000, mark the year in which Muhammad Ali won a gold medal in boxing at the Summer Olympics.
- Given a photograph of the Golden Gate Bridge and an incomplete reflection of it in the water below, mark the spot where the reflection of a specified point should appear.

Each team has two forms of assistance ("lifelines") that may be used once per game. Before any attempt to place a ring, the teammate not participating in a question may press a button to signal that they want to use a lifeline. The options are:

- Flip the Floor: A second question is presented, and the team then decides whether to play it or keep the original one.
- Team of Five: Each team brings a group of five supporters to the studio. The team's group members use individual tablet computers to indicate their guesses at the correct answer; these guesses are briefly displayed on the floor screen.

==== Series 1 ====
Each completed question increases the team's bank by one level (£1,000, £2,500, £5,000, £10,000, £25,000). The team begins with five rings and loses one for every unsuccessful placement. One team plays at a time and can only move on to the next round by completing the current one; their turn ends when they have either completed the fifth round or lost all their rings. The maximum potential bank is £25,000, obtained by completing all five rounds.

==== Series 2 to Series 4 ====
Each team has one turn in every round, and successful completions add a set amount to the bank that increases from one round to the next (£1,000, £2,500, £5,000, £7,500, £10,000). In addition, if one team misses a question, the opponents can steal the money at stake by correctly re-positioning the ring within 15 seconds.

The maximum potential bank is £52,000, obtainable if one team completes all five rounds and steals all available money from the opponents.

=== Final ===
Each team is given one ring, and one final question is presented. The higher-scoring team receives the larger of the two rings and decides which team will play the question. If the scores are tied, the teams receive identical rings and a coin toss decides control.

One member of the team playing the question has 30 seconds to position the ring as instructed. Successfully doing so awards the team their entire bank and sends the opponents home with nothing, while a failure forfeits the money and allows the opponents to keep their bank.

== Broadcast ==
Series	Start date	End date	Episodes
1	5 March 2017	16 April 2017	6
2	2 September 2018	7 October 2018	6
3	1 September 2019	6 October 2019	6
4	1 November 2020	6 December 2020	6

== International versions ==
Legend: Currently airing No longer airing Upcoming Pilot

Country	Local title	Channel	Presenter	Premiere date	End date
France	Les 5 anneaux d'or	France 2	Olivier Minne	24 August 2017	18 August 2018
Germany	5 Gold Rings	Sat.1	Steven Gätjen	12 October 2020	24 April 2021
Greece	5 Gold Rings	Star Channel	Unknown		
Hungary	5 Arany Gyűrű	RTL	Gábor Gundel Takács	24 March 2025	4 April 2025
Israel	חמש טבעות זהב; Khamesh Tvaot Zahav	Reshet 13	Yaron Brovinsky	29 April 2018	14 October 2019
Mongolia	5 алтан цагираг 5 altan tsagirag	Central Television	Ankhbayar Ganbold	3 November 2021	present
Netherlands (original format)	5 Golden Rings	SBS 6	Rik van de Westelaken (2017); Kim-Lian van der Meij (2018)	12 January 2017	28 February 2018
Saudi Arabia	خمس خواتم; Khams Khawatem	SBC	Yasir Al Saggaf	12 September 2018	present
Spain	El juego de los anillos	Antena 3	Jorge Fernández	7 August 2019	23 January 2021
Thailand	แหวน 5 ท้าแสน - 5 Golden Rings	Channel 7 HD	Varavuth Jentanakul	4 March 2019	29 September 2020
United States	5 Gold Rings	NBC	Kevin Pereira	2018	
Vietnam	5 vòng vàng kỳ ảo	VTV3	Bùi Đại Nghĩa (2018–2019); Bạch Công Khanh (2021)	1 December 2018 (Season 1); 2 September 2021 (Season 2)	23 March 2019 (Season 1); 2 December 2021 (Season 2)

=== Merchandise ===
A board game version of the series was released in 2018.
