= Rushen (disambiguation) =

Rushen may refer to:

== Places ==
- Rushen, formally Kirk Christ Rushen, a historic parish of the Isle of Man
  - Rushen (constituency), a House of Keys constituency of which the parish forms part
  - Rushen (sheading), a historical administrative division of which the parish forms part
- Rushen River, flowing through Glen Maye, Isle of Man

== People ==
- Arthur Rushen (fl. 1906–1908), British cyclist
- Patrice Rushen (born 1954), American musician
- Rushen Jones (born 1980), American football player

== Religion ==
- Rushen are preparatory practices in Dzogchen

== See also ==
- Russian (disambiguation)
