= Rossiysky =

Rossiysky (masculine), Rossiyskaya (feminine), or Rossiyskoye (neuter), all meaning Russian, may refer to:

- Rossiysky, Orenburg Oblast, a rural locality (a settlement) in Orenburg Oblast, Russia
- Rossiysky, Rostov Oblast, a rural locality (a settlement) in Rostov Oblast, Russia
- Rossiyskaya (Samara Metro), a station of the Samara Metro in Samara, Russia
- Rossiysky cheese, a type of cheese developed in Uglich, Yaroslav Oblast, Russia in the 1960s

== See also ==
- Russian (disambiguation)
