= Rusyn (surname) =

Rusyn is a surname. Notable people with the surname include:

- Nazariy Rusyn (born 1998), Ukrainian footballer
- Rostyslav Rusyn (born 1995), Ukrainian footballer

== See also ==
- Rusin (surname)
- Russin (surname)
