= Russini (surname) =

Russini is a surname. Notable people with the surname include:

- Dianna Russini (born 1983), American sports journalist
- Simone Russini (born 1996), Italian footballer
