= Rusin (surname) =

Rusin is a surname. Notable people with the surname include:

- Brad Rusin (born 1986), American soccer player
- Chris Rusin (born 1986), American baseball player
- Kinga Rusin (born 1971), Polish television presenter
- Sergey Rusin (born 1959), Russian freestyle swimmer
- Vladimir Rusin (born 1990), Russian badminton players

== See also ==
- Rusyn (surname)
- Russin (surname)
