= Russian =

Russian(s) may refer to:

== Related to Russia ==
- Russians (Russian: русские, romanized: russkiye), an ethnic group of the East Slavic peoples, primarily living in Russia and neighboring countries
- A citizen of Russia or a person whose ancestors were Russian citizens
- Russian language, the most widely spoken of the Slavic languages

== Media ==
- The Russians, a book by Hedrick Smith
- Russian (comics), a Marvel Comics supervillain
- Russian (solitaire), a card game
- "Russian" (Mandy), a 2020 television episode
- "Russians" (song), from the album The Dream of the Blue Turtles by Sting
- "Russian", from the album Tubular Bells 2003 by Mike Oldfield
- "Russian", from the album <|°_°|> by Caravan Palace

== Other ==
- Nik Russian, the perpetrator of a con committed in 2002

== See also ==
- Russia (disambiguation)
- Rus (disambiguation)
- Rossiysky (disambiguation)
- Russian River (disambiguation)
- Rushen (disambiguation)
