= Russin (surname) =

Russin is a surname. Notable people with the surname include:

- Babe Russin (1911–1984), American musician
- Robert Russin (1914–2007), American sculptor
- Robin Russin, American playwright, screenwriter, author, and educator

== See also ==
- Rusin (surname)
- Russini (surname)
