= Russian River =

Russian River may refer to any of the following:

- Russian River (Alaska), a river in Alaska
- Russian River (California), a river in California

== See also ==
- List of rivers of Russia
- Russian River Valley AVA, California wine region in Sonoma County
