= The Mole series 1 =

The Mole
- Series 1
- Presented by: Glenn Hugill
- No. of contestants: 10
- Winner: Zi Khan
- Runner-up: Jennifer Waller
- Location: Jersey; France
- The Mole: David Buxton
- No. of episodes: 9

Release
- Original network: Channel 5
- Original release: 12 January – 9 March 2001

Series chronology
- Next → Series 2

Series 1 of The Mole took place in Jersey and France and was hosted by Glenn Hugill.

== Contestants ==
Player	Age	Hometown	Eliminated	Occupation
Jules Woolston	33	Bolton	Episode 1	Conference Organizer
Gloria Bernard	47	Farnborough	Episode 2	Project Administrator
Paul Wallace-Sims	35	Bognor Regis	Episode 3	Religious Studies Teacher
John Church	53	London	Episode 4	Company Director
Jo-anna "Jo" Cortett	34	Isle of Man	Episode 5	Designer/Artist
Oliver "Ollie" Norman	22	Glasgow	Episode 6	Trainee Lawyer
Sara Lee	24	Droitwich	Episode 7	Financial Recruitment Consultant
David Buxton	35	London	The Mole	Merchandising Company Director
Jennifer "Jenny" Waller	37	Darlington	Runner-Up	Medical Representative
Zi Khan	32	Doncaster	Winner	Restaurateur

== Execution Chart ==
Elimination Chart
	1	2	3	4	5	6	7	8 & 9
Zi	IN	IN	IN	IN	IN	IN	IN	WINNER
David	IN	IN	IN	IN	IN	IN	IN	MOLE
Jennifer	IN	IN	IN	IN	IN	IN	IN	OUT
Sara	IN	IN	IN	IN	IN	IN	OUT	
Oliver	IN	IN	IN	IN	IN	OUT		
Jo	IN	IN	IN	IN	OUT			
John	IN	IN	IN	OUT				
Paul	IN	IN	OUT					
Gloria	IN	OUT						
Jules	OUT							

Blue indicates the player won the game
Yellow indicates the player was the mole
Green indicates the player won a free pass
White indicates the player was safe
Red indicates the player scored the lowest on the quiz and was sent home

== Episode list ==
=== Episode 1 ===
Episode 1 recap
Mission	Money earned	Possible earnings
Tandem skydive	£10,000	£10,000
Luggage repack	£0	£5,000
Hostage rescue	£0	£10,000
Current Kitty	£10,000	£25,000
Execution
Jules	1st player executed	

Tandem Skydive: The ten contestants were placed into 2 separate planes with half in each . The played to jump from 10,000 feet tandem and land on a beach in Jersey. If any one did not jump, the money would be lost. However, all succeeded and won the money.

Luggage repack: The players were separated into 2 cars. One car went to the hotel while the other containing Jules, Gloria, John, David and Jo were taken to the airport. There they had to repack their own luggage into rucksacks. They were given 10 minutes to place as much luggage into the bags with at least one item being left out. After the 10 minutes, they were then told they had to repack the other group's luggage but with only 7 minutes to do it but the same rules applied from before. When the time was up, the other group was brought in and had to guess what was left out. 3 out of the 5 had to get it right to win the money. Zi, Paul and Oliver got theirs wrong so the money was lost.

Hostage rescue: During dinner, Glenn asked the group who deserves an early morning call with votes being cast in secret. Zi was chosen and at the early hours was taken 45 minutes by car to a two-story building and locked in. The next morning, the group were first debriefed in a meeting room with various maps. No one noticed the name of the hostage location was on the maps but too concentrated on who was going in which mode of transport. The group was split in three, one team by boat (David, Sara and Oliver), one team by helicopter (John, Paul and Jo) and the team by car (Gloria, Jennifer and Jules). They were given 90 minutes to find Zi. Each team was given a phone with pre-programmed numbers of the other teams and Zi. Within each transport was a key which needed to be found to be able to free Zi but could not be used until all teams were there. With 3 1/2 minutes to spare they won the money.

However, later that night, the teams were shown footage of Jennifer driving the wrong way down a one-way street even with encouragement from the other players. Therefore, she broke the law. The rules state that if the law is broken then the money cannot be won so the money was taken away from them, losing them the game.

=== Episode 2 ===
Episode 2 recap
Mission	Money earned	Possible earnings
Charity	£5,000	£5,000
Golf	£0	£5,000
Tiger rally	£0	£10,000
Current Kitty	£15,000	£45,000
Execution
Gloria	2nd player executed	

Gloria did not take part in any of the assignments as she was apparently ill.

Charity: At breakfast, the group was asked to choose the best golfer (Oliver) and someone who has never played before (Sara) who were taken to the later challenge. The remaining 6 were then asked to split into 3 pairs: artists (Jo and Jennifer), animal lovers (David and John), and extroverts (Zi and Paul). The teams had to make a total of £150 which all proceeds would go to a local children's charity on the island. They were given 3 hours to complete this. The artists had to draw pictures of holiday makers who asked for it. The animal lovers had to offer donkey rides to holiday makers and the extroverts has to put on a punch and Judy show for children. They raised £216.51 and won the money.

Golf: While the other challenge was going on, Oliver was teaching Sara the basics on golf in 3 hours. When the others arrived at the golf club, the team had to answer general knowledge questions to earn 2 shots for Sara to hit the ball with the first four were already given to her for free. Sara had to put the ball into the 18th hole on the course to win the money. With only Paul getting the question right. Sara didn't put the ball and lost the money.

Tiger rally: The group has to split into 3 teams, two teams of 3 and one team of 2. One person in each team would be the navigator while the others would be pit crew and have to change tires. The teams were: John, Jennifer and Zi. Paul, David and Sara leaving Oliver and Jo. Each team was given a classic car. The navigator had to guide a driver round a course using a map. Halfway through, there was a pit stop where the pit crew would have to swap the rear tires. The navigators (Paul, John and Oliver) were given a lap round the course in a mini cooper to learn the course before hand. The teams had to beat a target time of 20 minutes to win the money. There was trouble switching tires which was mainly accused on Jo, cost the team time and lost the challenge going over by 3 minutes.

=== Episode 3 ===
Episode 3 recap
Mission	Money earned	Possible earnings
Bridge swing	£20,000	£20,000
Taste test	£0	£5,000
Night Maze	£15,000	£15,000
Current Kitty	£50,000	£85,000
Execution
Paul	3rd player executed	

For this episode, the players were taken from Jersey to the north of France but returned to Jersey for the rest of the series.

Bridge swing: The challenge was for the remaining 8 players to swing off of a bridge. If all 8 completed the swing within one hour of the first player swinging off the bridge, they would earn £20,000. All 8 completed the swing.

Taste test: The team is asked to divide themselves into 3 groups; 1 group of 2 and 2 groups of 3, with one group "with good taste" (who go to a local wine cellar to learn about wine making and tasting), "with an excellence nose" (who go to a local goat farm to learn of goat cheese), and the group of 2 "who can stand the heat" (taken to a château to learn French cooking). Then, during a black tie dinner, each team must use the info they gathered from their experience from the day to answer 1 question each. 2 out of 3 correct answers will win them £5,000.

Stand the Heat Team; (Jennifer and Zi) They are shown the 6 ingredients from the starter course that was prepared for dinner and put the ingredients in order of how the dish was prepared. The group got this answer wrong. However, even if they were correct, they would have been disqualified because John told them one of the ingredients was mint, even though the groups were told clear that only the group assigned to that task could answer, and that no other players can help.

Excellent Nose Team; (John, Sara, and Paul) They are given 3 goats cheeses to taste. 2 of the cheeses they had that day, while the other one they did not. They must pick the cheese they did not have to win. This one they got correct.

Good Taste Team; (Oliver, Jo, and David) They are given 3 red wines, 2 they tasted from the wine cellar they visited, while the other is not. They must choose the wine that they did not have that day. They answered wrong, losing the money.

Night Maze: The teams are brought to a maze (designed to look just like the "thumbprint" logo), and are divided into 4 teams of 2, with a Runner and a Navigator. The 4 runners must stay in the maze for a combined total of 5 minutes, as in the maze are 2 guards, to win £10,000. If even just one team is able to enter the maze and reach the exit, they will win £15,000. David entered the maze first, with Jennifer guiding him, and was able to survive for 1 minute and 31 seconds. Paul, with John directing him, only lasted for 20 seconds. Zi then tried, with Jo guiding him, and was caught after 32 seconds. Last was Oliver, with Sara guiding him. He had to survive for 2 minutes and 37 seconds or find the exit to win the money for the group. After 1 minute and 23 seconds, Oliver found the exit and won the team £15,000.

Paul correctly named the Mole's identity, having announced to the group that he knew who the Mole was. Later in a video diary, he cited David's company being named 'Black Sheep' as a hidden clue. Controversially, Paul was subsequently evicted from the show on the same episode, raising the question of whether he had been removed for discovering the Mole too early in the series.

=== Episode 4 ===
Episode 4 recap
Mission	Money earned	Possible earnings
Fishing	£5,000	£5,000
Overnight Stay	£10,000	£10,000
Leave the Island	£5,000	£5,000
Current Kitty	£70,000	£105,000
Free Passes
None	No one took the offer in Overnight Stay	
Execution
John	4th player eliminated	

Fishing: The group is asked to nominate two players to be sea scouts (John and Oliver), and they are led to their own boat. The other five are sent on a fishing trip with a team of two fishing in calm waters (Jo and Sara) while the other three (Jennifer, David and Zi) taking on the high seas. The goal to win £5,000 is for both teams to catch a combined 7 kilograms of fish in a 3-hour time span, with the added rules that the fish must be caught themselves and they must be back within the 3 hours or the challenge will be lost automatically.

The deep sea team was able to reel in 6.5 kilograms, leaving the shallow water team to get just .5 kilograms. They ended up getting 6 kilograms, smashing the target number and winning the money.

Overnight Stay: During the team's fishing trip, the two sea scouts were instructed to build a shelter to house five people on a tiny island. In order to win £10,000, the five fishermen must stay on the island until 7:00 AM to win. If at any point one of them wants to leave, they have to call Glenn using a cellular phone. That player will be picked up and will spend the night on the yacht with the sea scouts team (John and Oliver). Leaving will result in a forfeit of the money and the player that leaves will also receive a free pass to the next round.

Zi was actually thinking about using the phone, however, David and Sara split up the phone, with one taking the battery and the other holding the phone itself. The group stayed all night, winning £10,000.

Leave the Island: The team is told that they must get off the island themselves and that all the materials they need are located on the island. They have 2 hours to reach Glenn and win £5,000, with an added rule that no one can get wet above the waist. If they feel like they can't make it, they can radio Glenn and he'll come and get them, however that will lose the money. They found an inflatable boat, however it had numerous holes. They were somehow able to fix it enough and make it to Glenn on the yacht without getting wet above the waist, winning the money.

=== Episode 5 ===
Episode 5 recap
Mission	Money earned	Possible earnings
Brain Teasers	£0	£5,000
Blackjack	£0	£0
Family Game	£0	£5,000
Paintball	£0	£10,000
Current Kitty	£70,000	£125,000
Free Passes
Sara	Shoots Zi, who was last remaining teammate alive, in "Paintball".	
Execution
Jo	5th player eliminated	

Brain Teasers: The group is asked to split into 2 teams of 3 people. Each team has to enter an old war time fortification bunker to solve three brainteasers. Both teams have to solve all three brainteasers and exit the bunker in a combined time of less than 40 minutes. For every incorrect answer a team gives, they lose 5 minutes. The teams have to solve a brainteaser first before continuing. Team A of David, Sara, and Zi had one incorrect answer, but solved all three brainteasers in 19 minutes, 54 seconds. Team B of Jennifer, Jo, and Oliver therefore had to solve all three brainteasers in under 20 minutes 6 seconds. However, they had four incorrect answers, which is 20 minutes of penalties, going over the time limit and losing the challenge.

Blackjack: The players play five rounds or hands of blackjack to win chips that can be used as free passes against questions on the quiz. The aim is to get closest to 21 without going bust. The first winner wins 5 chips, which guarantees that one quarter of the 20 question quiz is correct. The second winner 4 chips and so on, down to one chip for the last winner. David won 5 chips, Oliver 4 chips, Jo 3 chips, Jennifer 2 chips and Zi 1 chip. Sara doesn't win any chips and cannot participate in the Family Game.

Family Game: On a stage inside an opera house, there are 12 individuals, arranged in two rows. Row 1 is numbered 1 to 6 and the second row is numbered 7 to 12. 6 of these individuals are family or friend of the players. 6 are imposters. The five players, who won chips in the blackjack game, have to guess the correct family member or friend. They have to get 21 correct out of 30 guesses to win £5,000. Jo's friend was correctly guessed 2 out of 5. Zi's friend was also correctly guessed 2 out of 5. Sara's friend was guessed by none of the five players, thus with already 11 incorrect guesses (4 of 15) the game was lost already. The game went on and David's partner was correctly guessed 4 of 5. Jennifer's brother 2 of 5 correctly guessed, and Oliver's friend was correctly guessed 3 times, for a final total of 13 correct guesses out of 30.

Paintball: Sara, who won no chips in the Blackjack game, is taken away from the group. The remaining contestants is brought to a course filled with planks and barrels set on a field. Sara is chained up and held captive in an army vehicle. The other 5 have to save her for £10,000. But there are snipers with paint guns. If the contestants are hit on their blue vest or on the head, they're dead. If they're hit anywhere else, it's a wound and they have to stop to put bandage on it. If they don't bandage it, the entire team will get disqualified. Three wounds equals death. To win the money, they have to go get Sara and return with her. If they get to Sara's location and unchain her, they can defend themselves with paintball guns. She has to be accompanied by at least 1 contestant. If she gets shot, they win nothing. If the other 5 all get shot... they win nothing. However, Sara (who had no free pass questions for the quiz) is offered a free pass to the next episode if she arrives alone to the finish line, but she would have to shoot her teammates and the money would be lost.

Zi is the first to reach Sara and finds the key to free Sara. Oliver and Jo also manage to reach Sara's location. David and Jennifer were out of the game, as the snipers hit them. Now armed, the four remaining players try to reach the finish line. Jo is isolated and a sniper hits her in the head. Jo is out. Oliver is protecting Sara while Zi is ahead of them on his own. Oliver gets hit, leaving Sara and Zi. Zi has to return to Sara's position. Zi proceeds to drag Sara to the finish despite Sara falling twice, somehow avoiding the snipers along the way. However, at the finish area, Sara shoots Zi twice, thereby earning herself a free pass to the next episode and the team wins no money.

=== Episode 6 ===
Episode 6 recap
Mission	Money earned	Possible earnings
Death Slide	£0	£10,000
Prediction Game	£5,000	£5,000
Interrogation	£15,000	£15,000
Current Kitty	£90,000	£155,000
Free Passes
None	David forfeited his chance to win a free pass in "Interrogation"	
Elimination
Oliver	6th player eliminated	

Death Slide: The contestants are asked to each slide down a zipline between two cliffs and then correctly answer a question about their time in the competition so far. At least 3 of the 5 contestants must agree to do so and succeed for the task to be won. The group decide that Sara and Jennifer will go last as they are scared of heights, meaning they will not have to take the challenge if the first three contestants succeed. Zi goes down the slide first and gets his question right. David, Oliver and Sara all complete the slide but get their question wrong. As the task is already lost, Jennifer does not have to attempt the slide.

Prediction Game: The group is asked to choose a member with a cool head and a competitive streak. They choose David. David goes off to visit a cafe with Simon, a "friend" of the producers. The producers secretly film them in the cafe. Afterwards, the rest of the group are shown four clips from this footage. During each clip, the video is paused and the group are asked a yes/no question about how David will react to a situation that is happening. The group must answer 3 of the 4 questions correctly to win the challenge and £5,000. They answer 3 questions correctly, winning the money.

Interrogation: David remains separated from the group. It is revealed to the viewers that Simon is an interrogation coach; he spends the afternoon coaching David in interrogation techniques, while the rest of the group relaxes. That night, at 11pm, instead of going to bed, the rest of the group (David is still absent) are taken to prison cells in a castle, where they are forced to kneel in "stress positions", deprived of sleep, and forced to listen to the show's theme tune on a loop. David is in charge of the prison, and can command the guards; he can order an inmate to be brought before him for interrogation, or for an inmate to be given a bed (an uncomfortable camp-bed with no covers or sleeping-bag) in their cell and allowed to sleep. David's task is to get the rest of the group to reveal information about their day; if they reveal all of the required information then David wins a free pass and the group can leave the prison and return to their hotel and comfortable beds, but the task and money are lost. If the group manage to withhold at least some of the information from David until 6am then they win the task and £10,000 (and David does not get a free pass). During the interrogations, David wears an earpiece through which Simon, who is watching via video link, gives him advice. David is not given any detail up front about what information he needs to win the free pass, but during the task Simon advises him on what line of questioning to follow, and, later, how many more pieces of information he needs. In fact the information needed is the fact that he was secretly filmed in the cafe, that the other contestants took part in a task that involved this, that they won, and the four questions they were asked. David interrogates each inmate repeatedly over the next few hours. Zi and, eventually, Sara each agree to give him some of the information in return for a bed. By 4am, only one more piece of information is needed. However, the remaining waking inmates refuse to disclose it. David has Zi woken up and brought to him; Zi angrily refuses to co-operate further, so David has his bed taken away. With 15 minutes to go, David has Sara woken up and brought to him. However, David, no longer able to accept the effect his actions are having on the other contestants, breaks down and refuses to continue with the task. Thus he forfeits his chance of a free pass, and the other contestants win the task and the £10,000.

=== Episode 7 ===
Episode 7 recap
Mission	Money earned	Possible earnings
Expert Challenge	£0	£5,000
Disguise	£0	£5,000
Roulette Dares	£15,000	£15,000
Current Kitty	£105,000	£180,000
Free Passes
Jennifer	Succeeded at staying hidden in "Disguise"	
Elimination
Sara	7th player eliminated	

The group is asked to choose a member who can mix in with any crowd. They choose Jennifer; she is taken away from the group to prepare for the second task. The remaining contestants take part in the first task.

Expert Challenge: The remaining group members are presented with three sporting champions, of bowls, fencing and jet-ski, but they are not told who is which. They must each challenge one of the champions to a match in one of the sports; as part of this they must try to guess who is champion in which sport, so as not to challenge a champion in their own sport, which would result in inevitable defeat for the contestant. At least 2 of the 3 contestants must win their match in order to pass the task and win £5,000. Sara challenges one of the champions at bowls and wins; he is later revealed to be the jet-ski champion. David challenges another of the champions to a jet-ski race; at first he leads the race, but he misses a buoy (which the racers must ski around or receive a large time penalty) and turns around to ski round it, losing the race. His opponent is revealed to be the fencing champion, although she also jet-skis as a hobby. Meanwhile, Zi loses a fencing match against the third champion, who is revealed to be the bowls champion. As 2 of the 3 members lost their matches, the task is failed.

Disguise: Meanwhile, Jennifer was disguising herself. For this task, she hid in a crowd in her disguise, and the remaining three (David, Sara, and Zi) had to find her. If successfully found, £5,000 would be added to the kitty, whereas if not Jennifer would receive a free pass to the finals. Jennifer managed to stay unidentified until time was up, and so earning herself the free pass.

Roulette Dares: After lunch, the players were taken to a roulette table with four envelopes. Each envelope contained a task that only one player would have to complete. A spin of the roulette wheel determined whether each player would do the easier (Black) task, or the harder (Red) task. To win, three of the four players needed to complete their tasks. The tasks were:

1A.Pierce your ear
1B.Piece your eyebrow or nose (Sara: nose piercing)

2A.Dye your hair (Jennifer)
2B.Shave your entire head

3A.Paint a nude person (Zi)
3B.Be painted while nude

The Trio Task (David: 1A, 2B, and 3B)

While David refused to complete his tasks, Jennifer, Sara, and Zi completed theirs, winning £15,000 for the kitty.

=== Episode 8 ===
Episode 8 recap
Mission	Money earned	Possible earnings
Boiler Suit Drop	£0	£15,000
Market	£0	£10,000
Current Kitty	£105,000	£205,000
Winner
Zi	Won the £105,000 kitty	
Mole
David	Revealed as the mole	

Boiler Suit Drop: The contestants are told to wear boiler suits and nothing else. Each contestant is dropped off in a different part of Jersey and given a GPS navigator and told to memorise some numbers. They have 2.5 hours to make their way on foot to a meeting-point, which is programmed into their GPS devices. At the meeting point, they will need all 3 contestants' numbers to open a safe containing £15,000 for the kitty. David reaches the meeting-point in time, but the others fail as Jennifer's GPS device apparently stops working and Zi is hampered by foot pain and leg cramp. It is revealed that all 3 contestants broke the rules by wearing other clothes underneath their boiler suits and would have caused the group to be disqualified anyway.

Market: The contestants are taken to a market and must follow a series of clues, where each clue indicates the location of the next. They have 45 minutes to do this, but take 3 minutes too long and fail the task.

Final Quiz: The final 3 take the quiz, with each player taking the quiz in their own private jail cell. After all 3 finish, Glenn asks for the winner's cell to be open. As the gate slides open, with Glenn's hand extended in congratulations, Zi is discovered to be the winner of £105,000. Afterward, they open the cell of the mole. Zi walks forward to shake hands with David, who is unmasked as the mole. Jennifer is then let out, as the runner up, and the group leaves.

=== Episode 9 ===
6 months after the game ended, the group was reunited to watch the final episode of The Mole (with only Glenn, Zi, David, and Jennifer knowing the outcome). The group finally learned the identity of the mole and the winner. The rest of the episode showed the sabotages and clues to point to the mole's identity.

=== Sabotages ===
David's Briefings: It is revealed that David would have late night briefings with the producers about the missions.

Parachute Jumping: David tried to talk Gloria (the person most scared of heights) into not jumping. However, Gloria decided to jump, and the mission was won.

Hostage Rescue: There were 2 parts to this sabotage. David changed one digit on Zi's pre-programmed number, casting suspicion on Oliver, who was using the telephone. David stressed this fact during the computer test. However, the team was close to winning and David had to think of something fast. He waved Jennifer to drive down the wrong way on a one-way street, breaking the law and losing the money. He then jumped and rode on the back of their vehicle so he would not be seen in the footage of this that was later shown to the contestants. Suspicion raised on Sara for being happy that they were close, and Oliver and Paul for not stopping Jennifer although the one-way sign was less than ten feet away from them.

Golf: David purposely answered his question incorrectly. However, all but one got their questions wrong too, lessening suspicion on David.

Rally: David reversed the direction on the socket wrench after using it, and it took Zi one minute to fix the problem. The car jack also was sabotaged to prevent it from going under the car.

Food Tasting: David purposely failed to stop Jo and Oliver from choosing Wine C instead of Wine A, losing the mission.

Bridge Swing: David was supposed to jump early. The plan was that David would fake a back injury and say it was scary but he thought it was going to be okay. However, many of the nervous people wanted to jump first. Therefore, David had to abandon his plans and jumped perfectly.

Maze: David chose Jennifer as a partner as he knew she had trouble telling left from right and would give him poor directions. After being caught by a guard in the maze, he then made Jennifer look suspicious by claiming her directions were confusing.

Fishing: David tried to avoid doing important tasks, but Zi did perform those tasks, winning the team money.

Island: David used a Swiss-Army knife to rip holes in the inflatable boat. Although some holes were plugged when found, David rushed the team into leaving early. The remaining holes took water into the boat, but not enough water could flood it, and the mission was won.

Family Game: David excused himself to the restroom to look at pictures of the contestants and their friends and family, which was hidden in a toilet stall. He and everyone else then answered enough questions wrong to lose the mission.

Paintball: In an overlooked sabotage, where Sara shot Zi to win a free pass and lost the mission for the team, David failed to bandage any of his wounds. The players were strictly told they were to bandage any wounds if shot or else the entire mission would be forfeited. Therefore, the money was lost long before Sara won the free pass.

Death Slide: David purposely answered his question wrong, and the mission was lost.

Interrogation: David, feeling the pressure of no sleep, not revealing that he was the mole, and receiving harshness from his friends, broke down when Sara was brought in and forfeited the free pass and won money for the group.

Sports: David purposely lost at water skiing. However, the person he was playing against water skied occasionally, while Zi played against a complete novice and lost. Therefore, the suspicion fell on Zi.

Disguise: David did little to help Zi find Jennifer. The suspicion, however, fell on Sara who found Jennifer the second the mission was over.

Roulette Dares: David purposely refused to do his challenge knowing Jennifer and Sara probably wouldn't do theirs. However, they did, along with Zi, and the mission was won.

Boiler Suit Drop: This was David's most blatant sabotage. David apparently took a long time to suit up when he really tampered with Jennifer's and Zi's GPS's, removing the direction arrow. Afterwards, the tape on the briefcase containing the GPS's was missing. David then proceeded to raise suspicion on Jennifer, saying that at the end her GPS was showing she was at the goal and he didn't understand why the arrow would suddenly disappear.

Market: David slowed everyone down; however, Jennifer and Zi took a long time to solve the Adrian Mole clue, raising suspicion on them.

==== The Hidden Clues ====
Baggage Swap: David had the smallest bag (along with a noticeable paper from the production company), which Glenn stated, "David has the smallest bag. Perhaps he knew this was coming." The players said they also had to lose one item permanently, and it won't be returned until the end of the season. However, the blue-jack shirt David discarded was the same shirt he wore in the final.

Jules's Elimination: It was made clear that Jules voted for Jennifer during the computer test, and was eliminated. Therefore, Jennifer could not be the mole.

The Mole's Notes: The mole left the same note at the golf course and the beach. At the end of both cutscenes, a child's buggy and a golf buggy are shown. In episode 6, David's nickname is clearly shown as "Buggy".

Episode 4 Elimination: David is seen wearing his bedtime slippers. Therefore, he knew he would survive that night's elimination.

David's Shirt: In several episodes, David wears a William's Bar T-shirt. The disguise taken off the "William in Question", reveals the man is William of Orange. In 1702, he died when he was flown from his horse, after it tripped over a molehill. Also, the made-up telephone number (4 26 843 6653) of the phony bar spells out "I AM THE MOLE", after using a keypad as a decoder.

Episode 7 Monologue: David said he thought there were clues in the intros during the computer tests. In fact, there was. In episode 7, Glenn says "He (Oliver) braved the death slide with a smile. But the mole was one step ahead of him." David went before Oliver in the death slide.

Brain Teasers: Glenn wraps up the failure of the mission by saying, "Were you genuinely stumped? Or was it that moles thrive underground?" During the mission, David is the one giving the correct answers.

Episode 5 Intro: The players were shown alphabetically by first name, except for David. However, if went by his nickname, Mole, he is in alphabetical order.

The Monologues: Adding together the first word Glenn says each episode gives: "The first words reveal the mole is David."

The First Meal: In the first episode, a table could be seen with tea, coffee, and bottled mineral water for the contestants. The bottles were labeled "BUXTON Mineral Water", Buxton standing for David's last name. Nobody picked up on this clue.

At the end of the night, as the players enjoyed a final meal together, Glenn pulls out a check for £105,000 and passes it down the table to Zi, tells the group he has another challenge for them, and toast them for their journey.

== Ratings ==
Official episode viewing figures are from BARB.

Episode no.	Airdate	Viewers (millions)	Channel 5 weekly ranking
1	12 January 2001	1.45	15
2	19 January 2001	1.39	13
3	26 January 2001	1.01	28
4	2 February 2001	1.13	22
5	9 February 2001	1.09	25
6	16 February 2001	0.88	30
7	23 February 2001	—	—
8	2 March 2001	1.41	16
9	9 March 2001	0.88	22
