= Glenn Hugill =

British television presenter, actor, and producer

- Born: 8 February 1970 (age 56); Darlington, County Durham, England
- Occupations: TV presenter, musician, producer, Managing Director
- Children: 2

Alwyn Glenn Hugill (born 8 February 1970) is an English television presenter, actor and producer. He is best known for playing policeman Alan McKenna in Coronation Street during the 1990s, presenting The Mole, and was the executive producer and Banker during the Channel 4 era of Deal or No Deal.

Hugill was previously managing director of the independent TV production company Possessed which became one of the most successful production companies in the UK. In early 2023, he sold Possessed to ITV and became chief creative officer of Wheelhouse, the media company founded by Jimmy Kimmel, where he then created the Netflix show Million Dollar Secret.

== Early life ==
Hugill grew up in Barnard Castle and was educated at the independent Barnard Castle School and Christ Church, Oxford. In 1980, as a ten-year-old schoolboy, he scored a 207 in a national IQ test designed for under 16s. It was the highest recorded result in the country. Local newspaper The Northern Echo then reported he took another test designed for adults and recorded a result of 177, the highest score the test was capable of registering.

At senior school, he developed an interest in music, film and television alongside classmate and lifelong friend Giles Deacon, now a major fashion designer. In interview, Deacon has recalled re Hugill "We both didn't really like the town we lived in and used to go and look at all the record covers in HMV in Newcastle; that was sort of an initial portal to other things that we didn't really know about. This when we were both about thirteen! That led onto an interest in music scenes, like Joy Division and early New Order, and various other bands".

== Career ==
Hugill began his career as an actor and director, becoming known for his time as Alan McKenna in Coronation Street.

Hugill also worked as a voice artist, appearing in numerous adverts and on the stunt series Mission Implausible on Sky One presented by Jason Plato and Tania Zaetta, The Whole 19 Yards on ITV1, and the Charlie Brooker series How TV Ruined Your Life and Screenwipe.

Hugill presented the UK version of The Mole and was the executive producer of Channel 4 game show Deal or No Deal. In 2015 Richard Osman suggested that he was also the mysterious Banker on the show, and this claim was further endorsed by Stephen Mulhern during an appearance on This Morning later that year but was only officially confirmed in 2025. He has produced or created many other game shows such as Playing It Straight, Beauty and the Geek, Cash Cab, Pointless, Two Tribes, Pick Me!, Divided, and most recently 5 Gold Rings, Moneyball, Unbeatable and Sitting on a Fortune.

He is also a writer with credits including the Deal or No Deal annual, the series Beauty and the Geek for Channel 4, Sky TV's Hollywood Autopsy and the reality crime series Texas S.W.A.T. in the USA.

In 2014, Hugill founded Possessed, a television production company. He has gone on to produce shows such as Cash Trapped, hosted by Bradley Walsh, and 5 Gold Rings, hosted by Phillip Schofield. The company won a Rose D'Or in 2016 for Best Gameshow of the year for Pick Me!. They were nominated again for Best Gameshow in 2018 for 5 Gold Rings. In the autumn of 2021, Possessed had two prime time gameshows on air at the weekends on ITV - Moneyball and Sitting On A Fortune. They have two BBC gameshows in Catchpoint and Unbeatable.

After joining Wheelhouse he created a number of hit formats including Million Dollar Secret for Netflix, Got To Get Out for Hulu, Last Bite Hotel for Food Network and Celebrity Puzzling for Channel 5 in the UK".

== Personal life ==
Hugill is married and has two children.

Hugill is a fervent supporter of Sunderland AFC.
