= The Mole (British TV series) =

- Genre: Reality game show
- Presented by: Glenn Hugill
- Country of origin: United Kingdom
- Original language: English
- No. of series: 2
- No. of episodes: 18

Production
- Running time: 60 minutes (inc. adverts)
- Production company: Action Time

Original release
- Network: Channel 5
- Release: 12 January – 9 December 2001

Related
- De Mol

The Mole is a British adventure reality game show based on the Belgian TV series The Mole, which has been adapted in other countries. The show aired on Channel 5 for two seasons in 2001 and was hosted by Glenn Hugill.

The first series of The Mole was filmed in Jersey and France, while the second took place in British Columbia, Canada.

== Format ==
Following the premise of other versions of The Mole format, the show features a group of contestants who must collaborate in a series of missions to win money for a Prize Fund, which serves as the game's grand prize. However, among the group of contestants is the titular "Mole" - a secret double agent hired by the producers to sabotage the money-making efforts of the group whose identity is unknown to the audience and the other players. The genuine contestants must find and follow the behaviour of The Mole during the game and the missions. The contestant who knows the least about The Mole, as determined by the results of a Quiz, is eliminated from the game. In the end, the player who knows the most about The Mole after participating in the Final Quiz is declared the winner and is awarded the Prize Fund.

== Series overview ==
Series	Premiere	Finale	Host	The Mole	Winner	Runner-up	Amount won	Location
1	12 January 2001	9 March 2001	Glenn Hugill	David Buxton	Zi Khan	Jennifer Waller	£105,000 / £200,000	Jersey; France
2	14 October 2001	9 December 2001	Glenn Hugill	Tanya Buck	Chris Lintern	Paul Tregear	£88,500 / £200,000	British; Columbia, Canada

=== Locations map ===
Locations of the British version of The Mole.
