= Western Rus =

Western Rus' may refer to:

- western regions of Kievan Rus', including:
  - Halychian Rus', an East Slavic medieval state, centered in Halych
  - Volhynian Rus', an East Slavic medieval state, centered in Volhynia
  - Halych-Volhynian Rus', an East Slavic medieval state, uniting Halych and Volhynia
  - Kingdom of Rus', an East Slavic medieval kingdom (Galicia-Volhynia)
  - Turovian Rus', an East Slavic medieval state, centered in Turov
  - Polotskian Rus', an East Slavic medieval state, centered in Polotsk
- several Slavic historical regions, including:
  - White Rus', an East Slavic historical region
  - Black Rus', an East Slavic historical region
  - Red Rus', an East Slavic historical region
  - Carpathian Rus', a historical region inhabited mostly by Rusyns (Rusynia)

== See also ==
- Rus' (disambiguation)
- Principality of Rus' (disambiguation)
- Grand Principality of Rus' (disambiguation)
- Ruthenia (disambiguation)
- Russia (disambiguation)
