= Ruthenian Americans =

Ruthenian Americans may refer to:

- Rusyn Americans, also referred to as Carpatho-Ruthenian Americans
- Ukrainian Americans, historically also designated as Ruthenian Americans
- White-Ruthenian Americans, an old term for Belarusian Americans

== See also ==
- Ruthenia (disambiguation)
- Ruthenian (disambiguation)
- Carpatho-Ruthenian (disambiguation)
- Carpatho-Ruthenians (disambiguation)
