= Ruthenian Church =

Ruthenian Church may refer to:

- Ruthenian Uniate Church, that existed from the 15th to the 18th century
- Ruthenian Byzantine Catholic Church, one of the 23 particular (sui iuris) Eastern Catholic Churches
- a church building that is fashioned in accordance with the liturgical Ruthenian Rite
- Ruthenian Orthodox Church (disambiguation)

== See also ==
- Ruthenian (disambiguation)
- Ruthenia (disambiguation)
