= White Ruthenians =

White Ruthenians may refer to:

- inhabitants of the historical region of White Ruthenia in general
- historical and exonymic term for Belarusians

== See also ==
- Ruthenia (disambiguation)
- Ruthenian (disambiguation)
