= North Ruthenian =

North Ruthenian or Northern Ruthenian may refer to:

- something or someone related to northern regions of Ruthenia (those regions are now belonging to the modern Belarus)
- northern varieties of the Ruthenian language (those varieties evolved into the modern Belarusian language)

== See also ==
- Ruthenia (disambiguation)
- Ruthenian (disambiguation)
