= Carpatho-Ruthenians =

Carpatho-Ruthenians or Carpathian Ruthenians may refer to:

- inhabitants of the historical region of Carpathian Ruthenia in general
- Carpatho-Ruthenian Slavs, including Carpatho-Ruthenian Rusyns and Ukrainians from Carpathian Ruthenia
- Carpatho-Ruthenian Jews, Jews from Carpathian Ruthenia
- Carpatho-Ruthenian Hungarians, Hungarians from Carpathian Ruthenia

== See also ==
- Carpatho-Ruthenian (disambiguation)
- Ruthenian (disambiguation)
- Ruthenia (disambiguation)
