= South Ruthenian =

South Ruthenian or Southern Ruthenian may refer to:

- something or someone related to southern regions of Ruthenia (those regions are now belonging to the modern Ukraine)
- southern varieties of the Ruthenian language (those varieties evolved into the modern Ukrainian language)

== See also ==
- Ruthenia (disambiguation)
- Ruthenian (disambiguation)
