= Rus =

Rus or RUS may refer to:

== People ==
- East Slavic historical peoples (Русь). See Names of Rus', Russia and Ruthenia
  - Rus' people, the people of Rus'
  - Rus, a legendary eponymous ancestor, see Lech, Czech and Rus
- Rus (surname), a surname found in Romania and elsewhere

== Historical places ==
- Kievan Rus', a medieval East Slavic state, centered in Kiev
- Rus' Khaganate, a ninth-century Eastern European state
- Ruthenia
- Vladimirian Rus', or Vladimir-Suzdal, an East Slavic medieval state, centered in Vladimir
- Halychian Rus', or Principality of Halych, an East Slavic medieval state, in region of Halych
- Volhynian Rus', or Principality of Volhynia, an East Slavic medieval state, in regions of Volhynia
- Halych-Volhynian Rus', or Kingdom of Galicia–Volhynia, an East Slavic medieval state, uniting Halych and Volhynia
- Kingdom of Rus', or Galicia-Volhynia, an East Slavic medieval kingdom
- Turovian Rus', or Principality of Turov, an East Slavic medieval state, in region of Turov
- Polotskian Rus', or Principality of Polotsk, an East Slavic medieval state, in region of Polotsk
- Novgorodian Rus', or Novgorod Republic, an East Slavic medieval state, centered in Novgorod
- Muscovite Rus', or Grand Duchy of Moscow, an East Slavic medieval state, centered in Moscow
- Tsardom of Rus', or Tsardom of Russia, an East Slavic early modern state, centered in Moscow
- Minor Rus', or Little Russia, an East Slavic historical region
- Great Rus', or Great Russia, an East Slavic historical region
- White Rus', or White Ruthenia, an East Slavic historical region
- Red Rus', or Red Ruthenia, an East Slavic historical region
- Black Rus', or Black Ruthenia, an East Slavic historical region
- Carpathian Rus', or Carpathian Ruthenia, an East Slavic historical region inhabited mostly by Rusyns (Rusynia), and a 1918–1919 provisional autonomous region, known as the "Rusyn Land"
- Subcarpathian Rus', or Carpathian Ruthenia, an administrative region of the First Czechoslovak Republic
- Western Rus (disambiguation)
- Principality of Rus' (disambiguation)
- Grand Principality of Rus' (disambiguation)

== Acronyms ==
- Rajshahi University School
- Réacteur Université de Strasbourg, a French nuclear research reactor
- Resonant ultrasound spectroscopy, a laboratory technique
- Route utilisation strategy
- Rural Utilities Service, an agency of the United States Department of Agriculture
- Raptor Upper Stage, a version of the SpaceX Raptor rocket engine

== Codes ==
- rus, the ISO 639-2 code for the Russian language
- RUS, the ISO 3166-1 alpha-3 and UNDP code for Russia
- RUS, the IATA airport code for Marau Airport

== Other places ==
- Ruś (disambiguation), the name of several Polish villages
- Rus, Jaén, a municipality in the Province of Jaén, Spain
- Rus, Sălaj, a commune in Sălaj County, Romania
- Ruse, Bulgaria, Bulgaria
- Ruski Krstur, Vojvodina, Serbia
- Rus, a village in Dumbrăviţa Commune, Maramureș County, Romania
- Rushall railway station, Melbourne

== Other uses ==
- Rus (1903), a Russian newspaper published intermittently from 1903 to 1908
- Rus (special forces), a unit of interior troops of the Russian Federation
- Rus-M, a cancelled Russian space rocket program
- Rüs, a 1990 role-playing game

== See also ==
- Russ (disambiguation)
- Ríos (disambiguation)
