= Russia (disambiguation) =

Russia, or the Russian Federation, is the largest country in the world by area, located in northern Eurasia.

Russia may also refer to:

== Historical states ==
- Soviet Union (USSR), the communist state that existed from 1922 to 1991
  - Russian Soviet Federative Socialist Republic (1917–1991), the largest of the fifteen Soviet republics
- Russian Republic (1917), a revolutionary state
- Russian Empire (1721–1917)
- Tsardom of Russia (1547–1721)
- Muscovite Russia (1283–1547)
- Novgorodian Rus' or Novgorod Republic
- Kingdom of Russia (1199–1349), centered in Lviv
- Kievan Rus' (882–1240), centered in Kyiv
- Rus' Khaganate, hypothetical political entity

== Settlements ==
- Russia, Ohio, a village in Shelby County
- Russia, New York, a town in Herkimer County
- Russia, New Jersey, an unincorporated community in Morris County
- Russia Township, Polk County, Minnesota

== Other uses ==
- Russia (ship), the name of several ships
- Russia (horse), an Australian racehorse
- Russia leather, a hard-wearing and water-resistant leather, where birch oil is worked into it after tanning
- Russia! magazine, a quarterly English-language publication about Russia
- 232 Russia, a large main belt asteroid
- Team Russia, the 2008–09 Volvo Ocean Race team

== See also ==
- Great Russia
- Little Russia
- Novorossiya (New Russia)
- New Russia (disambiguation)
- White Russia (disambiguation)
- Black Ruthenia (Black Russia)
- Prussia (disambiguation)
- Red Russia (disambiguation)
- Russia Tower, an unfinished skyscraper in Moscow, cancelled in 2009
- Rossiya (disambiguation)
- Rusia (disambiguation)
- Rusya
- Rossia
- Rus (disambiguation)
