= Novorossiysk (disambiguation) =

Novorossiysk (Novorossiysk Urban Okrug) is a city in Krasnodar Krai, Russia, founded 1838.

Novorossiysk may also refer to:

- Port of Novorossiysk, one of the largest sea ports in Russia
- Novorossiysk Commercial Sea Port, Russia's largest commercial sea port operator
- Soviet aircraft carrier Novorossiysk
- Russian submarine Novorossiysk
- Dnipro, a city in Ukraine that was named Novorossiysk from 1797 to 1802
- Novorossiya Governorate, or Novorossiysk Governorate, of the Russian Empire, 1764–83, and 1796–1802
- Novorossiysk, name given to Italian battleship Giulio Cesare by the Soviets after it had served in both World Wars and then joined the Soviet Navy

== See also ==
- Novorossiya
- New Russia (disambiguation)
