= Principality of Rus' =

Principality of Rus' or Duchy of Rus' may refer to:

- Principality of Halychian Rus', an East Slavic medieval state, centered in Halych
- Principality of Volhynian Rus', an East Slavic medieval state, centered in Volhynia
- Principality of Halych-Volhynian Rus', an East Slavic medieval state, uniting Halych and Volhynia
- Principality of Rus' (1658), a proposed state in Eastern Europe
- Duchy of Rus' (voivodeship), a province of the early modern Kingdom of Poland (from 15th to 18th century)

== See also ==
- Grand Principality of Rus' (disambiguation)
- Rus (disambiguation)
- Russia (disambiguation)
- Ruthenia (disambiguation)
