= Rossiya =

Rossiya or Rossija (the Romanization of the word Россия) may refer to:

- Russia (Russian: Россия)
- Rossiya (icebreaker), Russian icebreakers named Rossiya
- Rossiya or Rossia, an Imperial Russian cruiser launched in 1896
- Rossiya, an Imperial Russian ship of the line launched in 1839
- Rossiya Airlines, owned by the Russian government and based in Saint Petersburg
- Rossija (train), a passenger train service Moscow-Vladivostok through the Trans-Siberian Railway
- Rossiya Bank (Russia Bank), a Russian joint stock bank based in St. Petersburg
- Rossiya Hotel (Russia Hotel) in Moscow, demolished 2006–2007
- Rossiya 1 (Russia 1, previously RTR), a Russian TV channel
- Rossiya 2 (Russia 2, previously Sport TV), a Russian TV channel
- Rossiya (musical ensemble), a Russian musical ensemble

== See also ==
- Russia (disambiguation)
