= Grand Principality of Rus' =

Grand Principality of Rus' or Grand Duchy of Rus' may refer to:

- Grand Principality of Kievan Rus', a medieval state that arose among East Slavs, centered in Kiev
- Grand Duchy of Lithuania and Rus', medieval Eastern European state, with a high influence of Rus' culture
- Grand Principality of Moscow, medieval Eastern European state; their ruler also wielded the title Sovereign of all Russia
- Grand Principality of Rus' (1658), a proposed state in Eastern Europe

== See also ==
- Kingdom of Ruthenia
- Principality of Rus' (disambiguation)
- Rus' (disambiguation)
- Russia (disambiguation)
- Ruthenia (disambiguation)
