= Rusia =

Rusia may refer to:

- Russia, a country in Eurasia, called in some languages as Rusia
- Rusia, a name formerly applied to several mediaeval and early modern states, see Names of Rus', Russia and Ruthenia
- Rusia, Poland, a rural settlement in Poland
- Magda Rusia, Georgian gymnast

== See also ==
- Rusia Petroleum, a former Russian company
- Russia (disambiguation)
- Rusya, Belarusian singer
- Russya, Ukrainian singer
- Rosia (disambiguation)
