= Zhyrovichy Irmologion =

Belarusian-Ukrainian religious musical manuscript (c 1620s–1649)

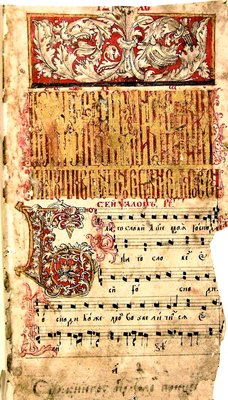
- A folio from the Zhyrovichy Irmologion featuring the All-night vigil
- Author: Ioann Kolbek (scribe)
- Original title: Жыровіцкі Ірмалой
- Language: Church Slavonic (Ukrainian-Belarusian recension)
- Genre: Irmologion
- Publisher: Zhyrovichy Monastery
- Publication date: c. 1620s–1649
- Publication place: Grand Duchy of Lithuania
- Media type: Manuscript

The Zhyrovichy Irmologion (Belarusian: Жыровіцкі Ірмалой, Zhyrovitski Irmaloy) is a 17th-century illustrated musical manuscript of Orthodox Catholic liturgical chants, known as an irmologion. The manuscript is a Belarusian-Ukrainian language collection of mixed compositions following a linear musical notation. It reflects the history of singing at the Zhyrovichy Monastery and the early tradition of Belarusian Greek Catholic (or Uniate) singing, which at the time of the manuscript's creation, did not fundamentally differ from the Eastern Orthodox tradition (divergences would later appear in the Uniate repertoire).

== History ==
An archaeographical analysis and description of the Zhyrovichy Irmologion manuscript was conducted by the Ukrainian source study expert Liubov Dubrovina. According to her dating, the majority of the collection belongs to the 1620s, with a small portion of texts dating to the 1640s (up to 1649). According to Belarusian musicologist Volha Dadzijomava, the Zhyrovichy Irmologion was created in 1649 in the Zhyrovichy Dormition Monastery, which was already Uniate at that time.

Judging by the marginalia in the manuscript, the scribe or compiler was Ioann Kolbek, who in 1661 "brought [it] as an eternal gift to the miraculous icon of the Most Holy Theotokos of Zhyrovichy and the church of her foundation..." Ivan Kuzminsky of the Tchaikovsky National Music Academy of Ukraine also believes that the Irmologion was copied by Ioann Kolbek in 1661, adding that the copying took place directly within the walls of the Zhyrovichy Monastery.

Another viewpoint suggests that a folio inscription indicates the transfer of the text to the Zhyrovichy Monastery in 1662 "as an eternal gift for his health and salvation and that of his kin..." (folios 2–15), which is significantly later than the compilation of the collection. This supports the theory that the Irmologion, with its diverse repertoire, was not based on a local protograph, but rather that its repertoire was mastered within the monastery after the manuscript was donated. After receiving the Irmologion, it was used for a long time in the "choir of the Zhyrovichy church" (folios 24–26). Its subsequent location is known to have been Pochayiv in 1761, after which it was held in the library of the Suprasl Monastery. Currently, the Zhyrovichy Irmologion is kept in the funds of the Vernadsky National Library of Ukraine (Institute of Manuscripts of NBUV, F. 1. No. 3367).

== Confessional affiliation ==
The Zhyrovichy Irmologion reflects the early tradition of Belarusian Greek Catholic singing. At the time of the collection's creation, this tradition did not fundamentally differ from the Orthodox one. However, the afterword "Tale of the Roman Pascha" and the dedicatory inscription testify that the book belonged directly to the Uniate environment; without these two elements, determining the Uniate affiliation of the copy would be difficult. Following the forced conversion of the Zhyrovichy Monastery to the Union of Brest, the traditional repertoire was preserved and somewhat expanded, but new chants in the monastery's repertoire also bore an Orthodox character. This is evidenced by the presence of these same chants in collections of Orthodox monasteries written at the same time.

According to musicologist Volha Dadzijomava, the Zhyrovichy Irmologion is an example of the Uniate tradition of creating manuscripts and musical editions, which captured features of West Ruthenian (Belarusian) Orthodox ritualism. This is primarily manifested in the structure and musical stylistics of the collections of this tradition. The preservation of local Orthodox traditions and their survival in the complex confessional conditions of the 17th century are direct consequences of this Uniate tradition.

== Structure ==
The Zhyrovichy Irmologion is divided into four sections of chants, tracing back to the Znamenny chant of South-Western Rus' and considered traditional. These sections include the Obikhod (Common Chants), Octoechos (stichera, irmosoi, automela), Menaion, and the Triodion included in the annual cycle. The Zhyrovichy tradition was not bypassed by the "poly-chanting" (многораспевность) characteristic of that time, as some Obikhod texts in the collection are presented by groups of melodies. The creation of these groups of melodies is considered primarily a manifestation of monastic practice. Specifically, these groups are presented in the collection by a selection of several Cherubic Hymns, intended for both weekdays and holidays. It is from the Cherubic Hymns that conclusions are drawn about the high level of knowledge of the scribe and his intention to introduce melodies of contemporary traditions.

== Chant traditions represented ==
The manuscript is a collection of various local chants. Ukrainian musicologist Ivan Kuzminsky considers this fact proof that at the time of the Irmologion's creation, people from various territories of the Kiev Metropolitanate, who ended up in Zhyrovichy as a result of war, were present in the monastery. Citing Ukrainian researcher Yury Yasinovsky, (Note: Referring to: Yasinovsky, Yuri. *Ukrainian and Belarusian Staff Notation Irmologions of the 16th–18th Centuries. Catalogue and Codicological-Paleographic Study*. Lviv: Misioner, 1996. pp. 126–128.) Kuzminsky provides a list of chant varieties found in the Zhyrovichy Irmologion: "Kiev, Ostroh, Pidhirci, Belarusian, Vilna, Slutsk, Kremenets, Skete, Serbian, Bulgarian, Greek."

The melodies presented in the Irmologion often reflect local Ukrainian-Belarusian singing traditions, as evidenced by the names cited by the scribe: "Slutsk", "Kremenets", "Podhorska". The Cherubic Hymns of the Zhyrovichy Irmologion differ from traditional ones by their so-called "couplet" form. The "new" Cherubic Hymns of this collection, according to researchers, have intonational kinship with Kiev or Bulgarian chant. Researchers note the absence of the name "Zhyrovichy chant" in the collection, which suggests the prevalence of a general repertoire in the monastery rather than a specific local tradition. However, the possibility of the oral existence of such a tradition is acknowledged.

Direct contacts with the Ukrainian tradition or reliance on Ukrainian protographs are evidenced by part of the Obikhod melodies of the Zhyrovichy Irmologion. Researchers classify the authentic "Kiev" and "Ostroh" melodies of the verses "Blessed is the Man" among these (their fame under these names begins from the time of the collection's creation). Connections with the Ukrainian tradition are also indicated by the presence of several Ukrainian remarks in this collection, alongside well-known ones, which are not found in other sources (e.g., "Kremenets", "Ukrainian").

Of undoubted interest in the Zhyrovichy Irmologion is a small selection of liturgical chants of "Greek chant". This also serves as an indication of the collection's age, since in later Uniate practice, Greek chant is almost completely absent, and according to Archpriest Ivan Voznesensky, was excluded entirely. "Greek chant" hymns are represented in the collection by three liturgical texts: "Agios o Theos" (2 redactions), "Kyrie eleison", and a "Greek" Cherubic Hymn (to Greek text). (Note: This Cherubic Hymn is found in other sources under different names: as "Bulgarian" in the Carpathian Dolinyany Irmologion (late 16th–early 17th c.); as "Greek transfer" in the Polish Irmologion of 1631 by priest Zachariah Bruslenovsky; as "Greek everyday" in the Kiev Mezhigorsky Monastery Irmologion (1640s); as "Greek milyalya" with Church Slavonic text in the Belarusian Belokovel Irmologion (GIM. Syn. chant No. 1368); as "everyday" tone 7 in the Skete Manyava Irmologion; without a special name in the Belarusian Irmologion compiled in Moscow (GIM. Syn. chant No. 890), and other monuments.) The main difference between the Belarusian versions of this Cherubic Hymn, including the Zhyrovichy one, from all Ukrainian ones is the absence of the introductory intonation formula "Neanes".

Regarding the chants of the "Bulgarian chant", the Zhyrovichy Irmologion is recognized as the first known monument of the first half of the 17th century with a rich collection of texts of this chant. There are 119 chants marked as "Bulgarian chant". These include Bulgarian chants for the Liturgy of St. John Chrysostom, dogmatics in 8 tones, "God is the Lord" including troparia in 8 tones, refrains for Great Feasts and Feasts of the Theotokos, sedalens in various tones, a large number of stichera (both Evangelical, funeral, and for various church holidays), etc. Thus, the "Bulgarian chant" collection is represented both by cycles and by individual chants. Based on such a large number in the collection, Ukrainian musicologist Lidiya Korniy concludes that the Zhyrovichy Monastery was a center for the particular dissemination of "Bulgarian chant".

Closely related to the collection of "Bulgarian chant" hymns is another distinctive feature of the Zhyrovichy Irmologion: the presence of two extremely rare Serbian chants: a Cherubic Hymn and a communion verse "Praise the Lord from the Heavens". The Serbian chant Cherubic Hymn is known only from this version of the collection, while the Serbian redaction verse is more popular and accompanies the known Bulgarian redaction.

Also associated with Bulgarian chant are two versions of the hymn "It is Truly Meet" (Достойно есть), which is a distinctive feature of the Zhyrovichy Irmologion, as ordinary Ukrainian and Belarusian irmologions usually contain only one version or none at all (indicating oral performance). One theory suggests this rarity was due to the consecration of the Zhyrovichy Monastery in honor of the Dormition of the Mother of God.

== Features ==
The Zhyrovichy Irmologion selection is considered one of the first of its kind and richest in composition. Monuments synchronous to the Irmologion "lag behind" it in the area of text redaction and musical notation. For example, Khomonia (singing with emphatic vowels) is presented in the collection at a fading stage, and for the Kiev notation, a deliberately "square" script is used. The text is characterized by the abbreviation of a number of chants in writing: for example, in 24 chants, fita melismas (complex melodic flourishes) were replaced by the notation 33. (Note: In Russian Znamenny notation, a sequence of supralinear notes containing the letter theta (*fita*), indicating very complex and long melodies.) On folios 82–92 of the manuscript, in the irmosoi of the 2nd tone, square brackets are used to format fita chants. (Note: The same formatting with square brackets was later applied in the graphics of the old printed Lviv Irmologion of 1709.) Thus, fita chants in this collection were reproduced either from memory or from other records of these same fitas in the manuscript. Distinctive to the Cherubic Hymns of the Zhyrovichy Irmologion is their so-called "couplet" form (repeating strophic), where the first melodic line was used for all lines of text. Alongside a number of advanced changes, the Zhyrovichy Irmologion also contains certain archaic writing features (C-clef on the bottom line, mutations).

== Gallery ==
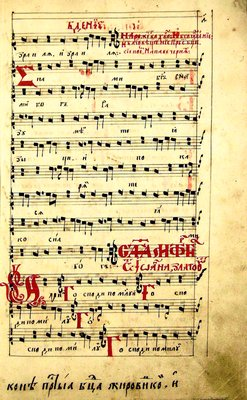
All-night vigil. Folio from the Zhyrovichy Irmologion

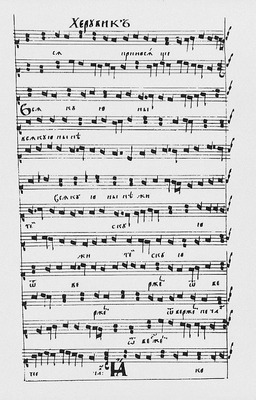
Folio from the Zhyrovichy Irmologion

== Literature ==
- Dadzijomava, V. U. (2012). Гісторыя музычнай культуры Беларусі да XX стагоддзя [History of the Musical Culture of Belarus up to the 20th Century] (in Belarusian). Minsk: Беларуская дзяржаўная акадэмія музыкі. ISBN 978-985-7048-05-2.
- Karniy, L. (2001). Балгарскі напеў у беларускіх ноталінейных Ірмалоях канца XVI — пачатку XVII ст. з украінскіх кнігасховішчаў [Bulgarian chant in Belarusian linear notation Irmologions of the late 16th – early 17th centuries from Ukrainian book depositories]. Гісторыя, культуралогія, мастацтвазнаўства: Матэрыялы III Міжнар. кангрэса беларусістаў [History, Culturology, Art Studies: Materials of the 3rd International Congress of Belarusianists] (in Belarusian). Minsk: Беларускі кнігазбор. pp. 340–343. ISBN 985-6638-35-6.
- Kuzminsky, I. (2018). История церковной музыки через призму деятельности украино-белорусских митрополитов и епископов XVII века [History of Church Music Through the Prism of the Activities of Ukrainian-Belarusian Metropolitans and Bishops of the 17th Century]. Journal of the International Society for Orthodox Church Music (in Russian). 3 (1): 22–38. ISSN 2342-1258.
- Shevchuk, E. Yu. (2008). Певческая традиция Жировичского монастыря [Chanting tradition of the Zhyrovichy Monastery]. Православная энциклопедия [Orthodox Encyclopedia] (in Russian). Vol. 19. pp. 263–273.
