= Carpatho-Russian =

Carpatho-Russian or Carpathian Russian may refer to:

- American Carpatho-Russian Orthodox Diocese, an Eastern Orthodox ecclesial body
- Russian minority in Carpathian regions of modern Ukraine
- As an alternative term for Rusyns

== See also ==
- Russian (disambiguation)
- Carpatho-Ruthenian (disambiguation)
