= Zhyrovichy Monastery =

Orthodox monastery in Zhyrovichy, Belarus

Coordinates: 53°00′52″N 25°20′40″E

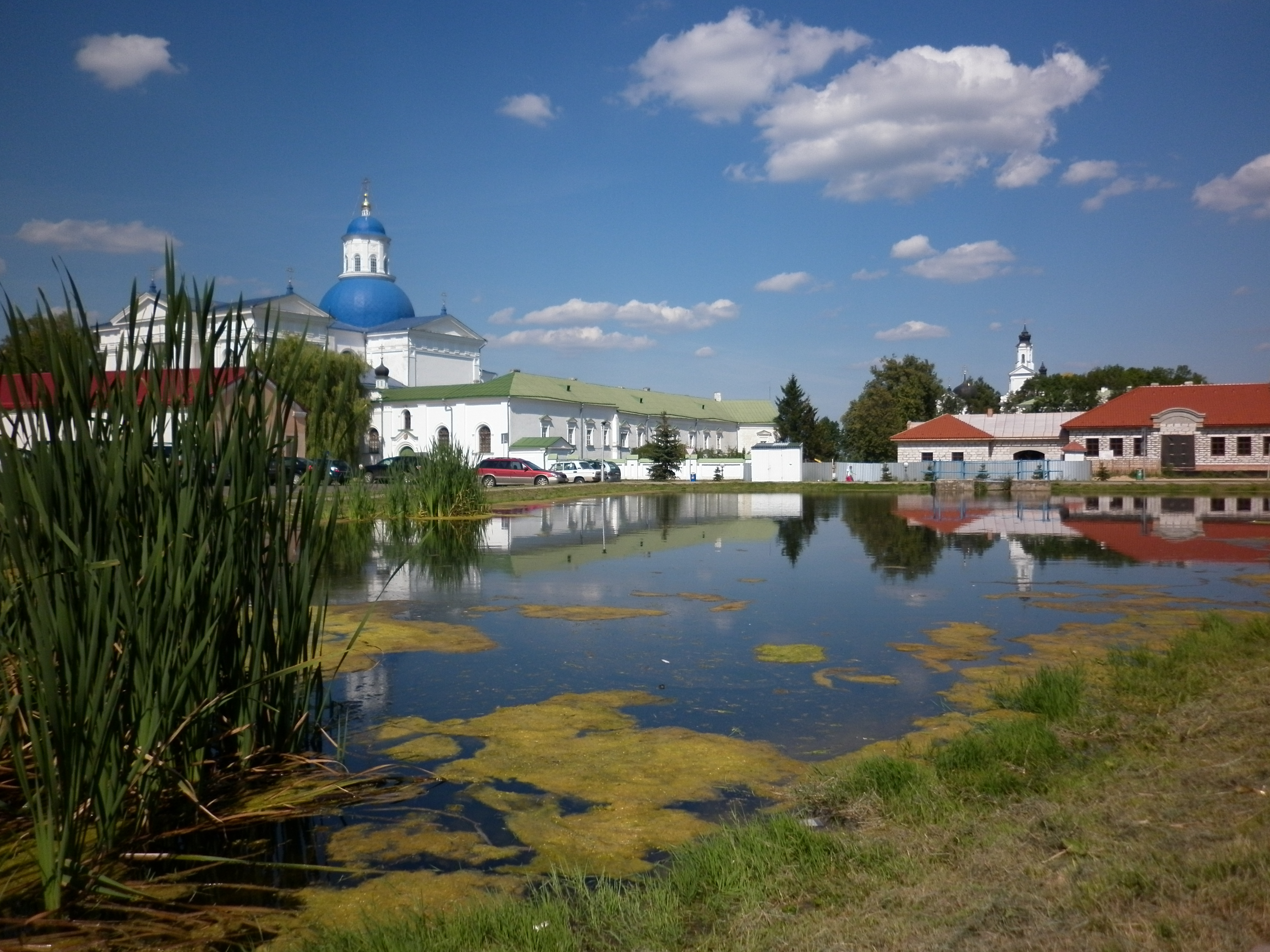
Zhyrovichy monastery

Zhyrovichy Monastery (Belarusian: Жыровіцкі манастыр) is an Orthodox monastery in Belarus, in the village of Zhyrovichy (Slonim rajon, Hrodna voblast).

== Legend ==
One night around 1500 (storytellers and scholars disagree on the year), some herders noticed a wild pear tree radiating light, whose source in the branches turned out to be a jasper oval, about the size of a child's hand, carved with the image of a woman and child and the Slavonic inscription, «More honorable than the cherubim, And more glorious beyond compare than the seraphim, In virginity you bore God the Word; True Mother of God, we magnify you». The portrait was recognizable as an Eleousa or Tenderness type of icon, with the child's cheek against his mother's, and the words as the refrain of the Magnificat in the Eastern liturgy.

== History ==
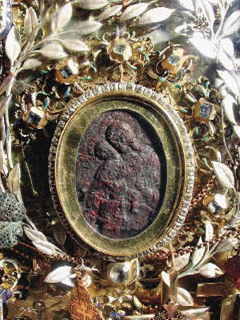
Mother of God of Zhyrovichy (XV st., oval icon on jasper)

The monastery was founded in the 16th century. Due to a belief, an icon of Virgin Mary was found in the local woods. A church was built on the place where the icon was found, but soon it was burned by fire and the icon was lost.

Many years later the icon was found again with mysterious imprints on it – presumably those of Virgin Mary’s palm and foot. The icon is considered miraculous and the stone became part of the altar in the church of Exaltation of the Cross. Since then the Zhyrovichy monastery is a major place of pilgrimage in Belarus. Until 1609 the monastery was Orthodox. Then the monastery was transferred to the Uniate order of Basilian. The original buildings of the monastery were wooden. A major fire occurred in the monastery in 1655. After that the monastery rebuilt already largely made of stone. At the monastery in Zhyrovichy has three temples. Firstly, it is the center and the main temple of the monastery - the Holy Assumption Cathedral, which was built in 1613– 1650 years. The cathedral was significantly rebuilt in 1839, so its appearance is not too well reflects its age. The second temple in Zhyrovichy is the church of God Apparitions, built in 1796. The third temple is the church of the Holy Cross, built in 1769. It is designed so that the entrance and to the altar lying wide staircase made to slowly climb the stairs, stopping at each step to pray. The temples and churches of the monastery in Zhyrovichy are important architectural monuments of his time, valuable objects of historical and cultural heritage, and prominent landmarks.

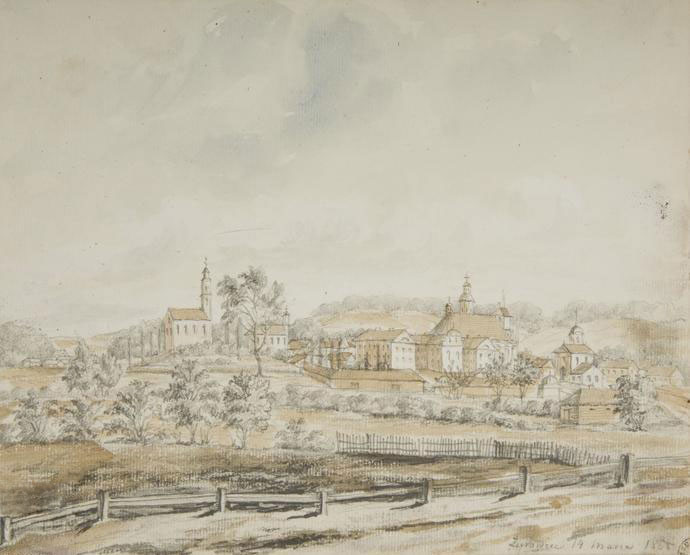
Napoleon Orda. Zhyrovichy. 14.03.1865

The complex of buildings of the monastery in Zhyrovichy includes many more facilities which were mostly built in the 17-18 centuries. Among these buildings there seminary building, residential housing for the monks and seminarians, outbuildings. Outside the main territory of the monastery in the village Zhyrovichy a few objects are located that although there are separate yet are related to the monastery. There is the bell tower, built in 1828 in front of the main cathedral of the monastery. The bell tower in the village Zhyrovichy be performed under the church and the monastery, it is more not only like a bell tower as another separate temple. Belfry made on such a scale is a unique attraction of Belarus. In Zhyrovichy there are two saints source.

A copy of the stone image was brought to Rome, where it is revered as the Madonna del Popolo in the Church of Sts. Sergio and Bacchus. In 1730, Athanasius Sheptitsky, Greek Catholic Metropolitan of Kiev and Galicia, solemnly crowned the Mother of God of Zhyrovichy with a Roman crown blessed by Pope Benedict XIII. Being in the hands of uniats, the sacred image was deeply celebrated by both uniats and catholics. A great reverence to this icon was shown by the kings of Poland. In the 1839, the monastery returned to Orthodoxy.

In 1915, the icon was moved to the crypt of St. Basil’s Cathedral on Red Square in Moscow. Smuggled out of the Soviet Union in a shipment of jam, it returned to the Grodno diocese in 1938, missing most of its ornaments. Nowadays the icon is kept in the cathedral of the Holy Blessed Virgin's Assumption, in the monastery of Zhirovichy.

== Practices ==
The Belarusian Greek Catholic Church and Roman Catholic Church in Belarus celebrate the feast of the Mother of God of Zhyrovichy on May 7. Russian and Belarusian Orthodox Churches celebrate the feast of the Mother of God of Zhyrovichy on May 20 (May 7 in the Julian calendar). The Saint Ascension monastery in Zhyrovichy existed even during Soviet times and in 1989 it became a clerical seminary – a highest religious educational institution, accepting entrants from all the countries of the former USSR.

== Gallery ==
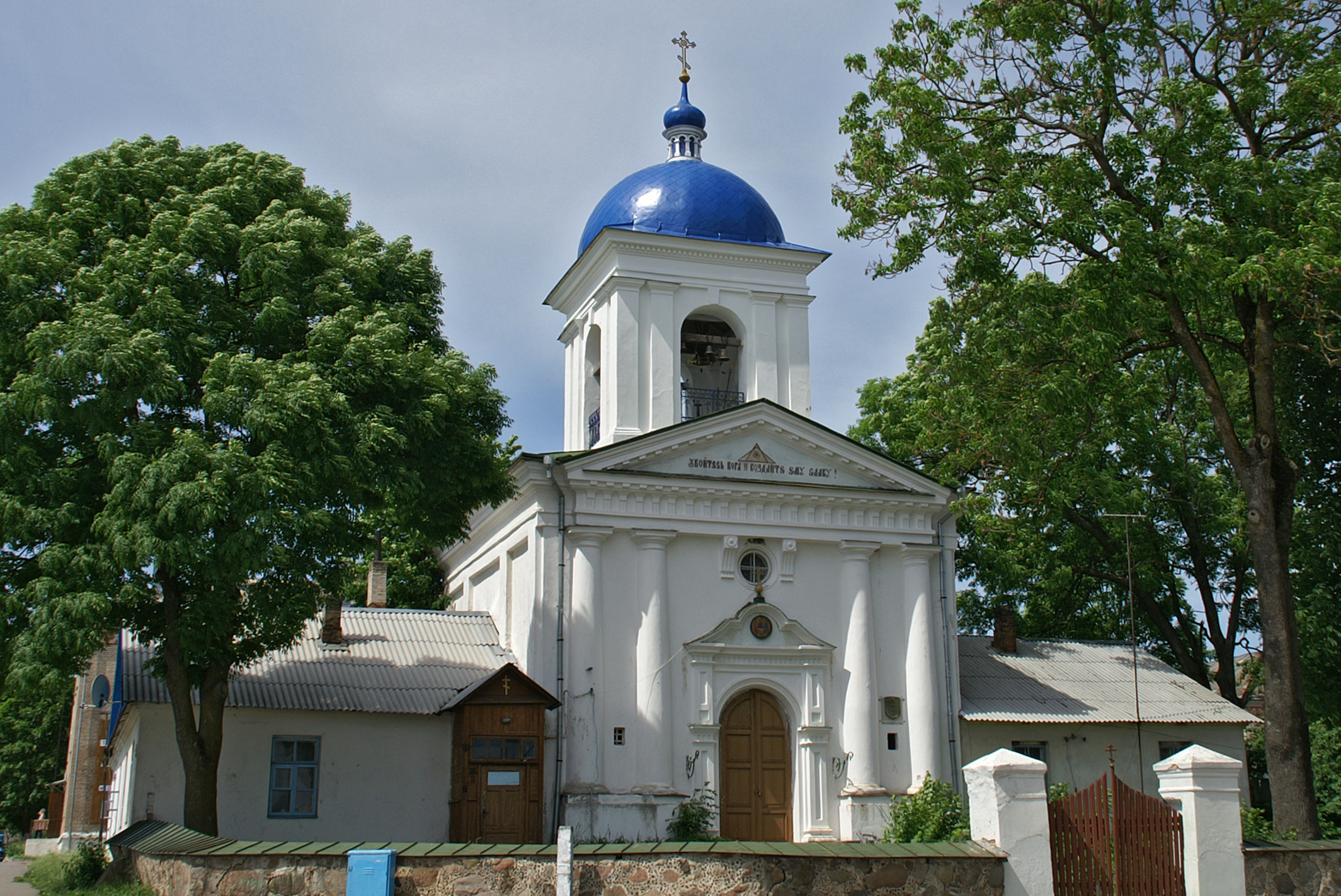

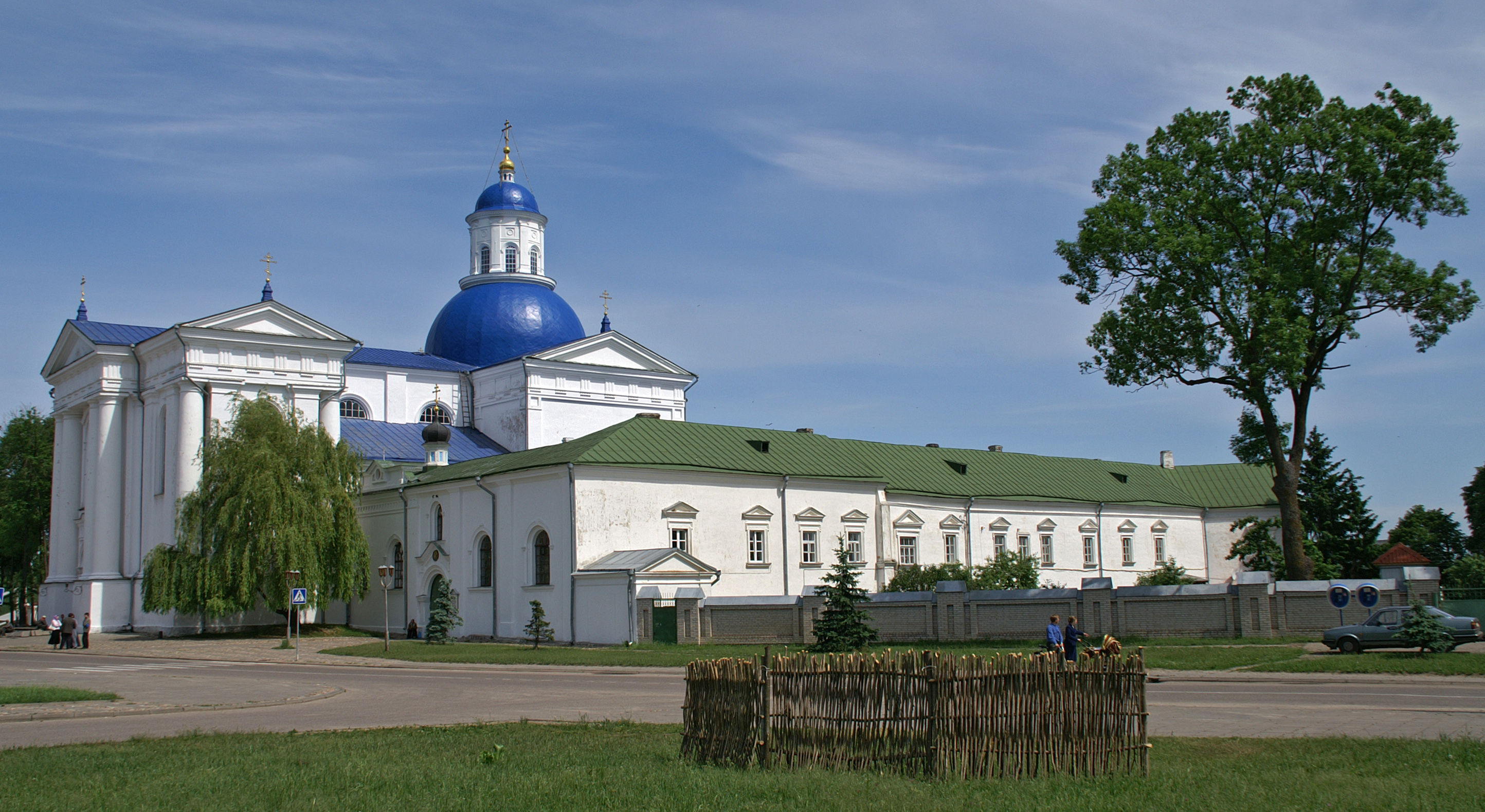

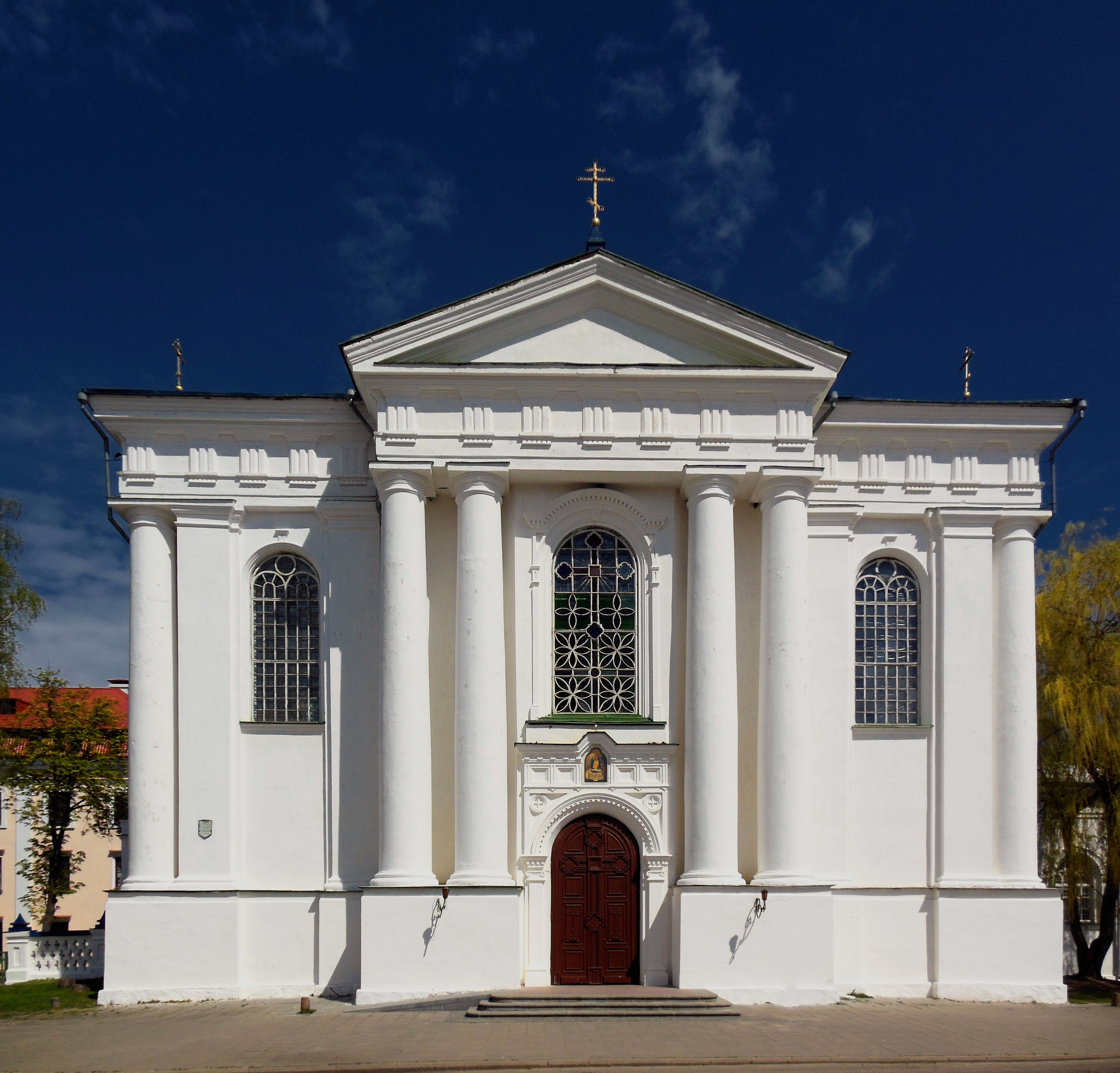

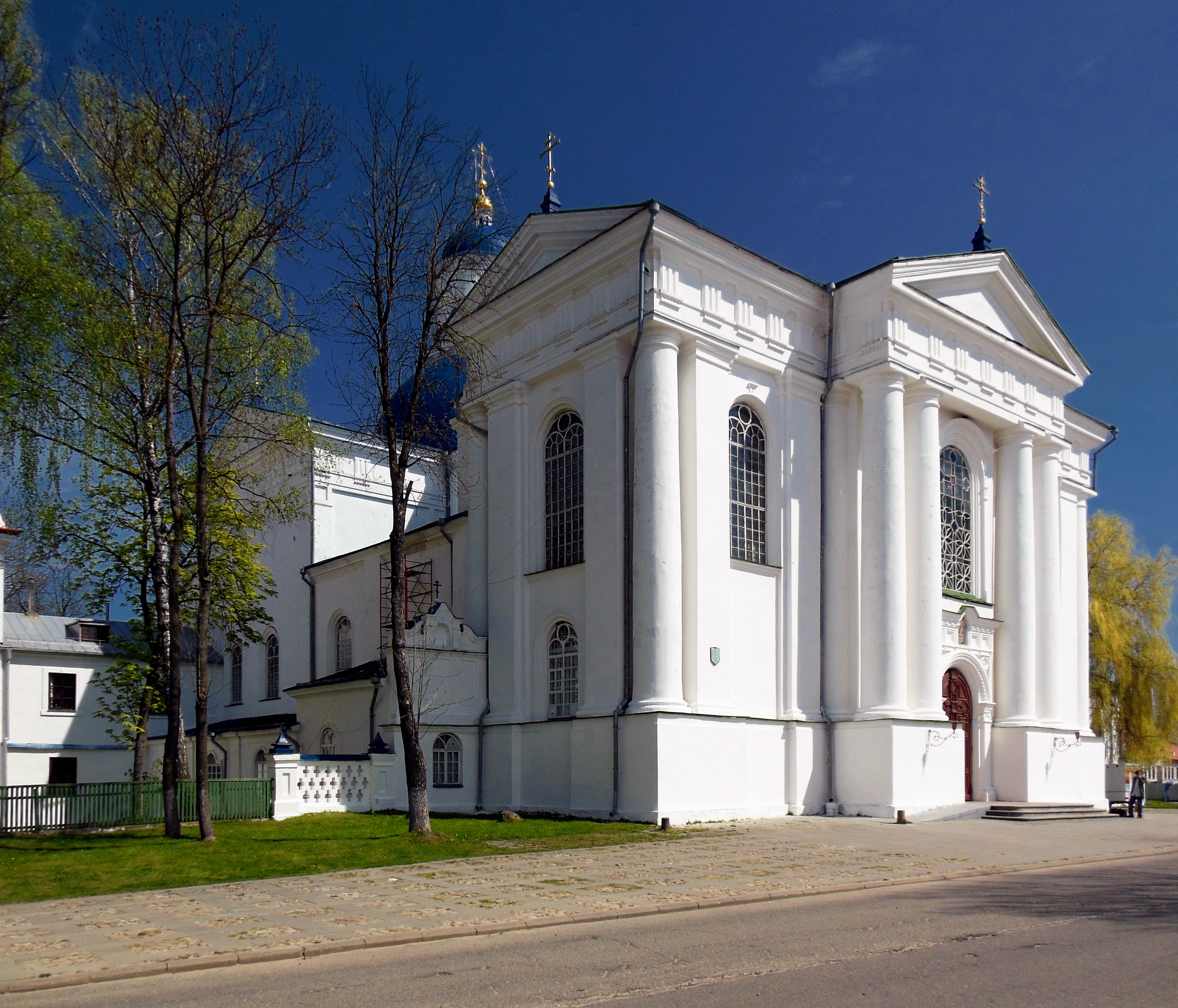

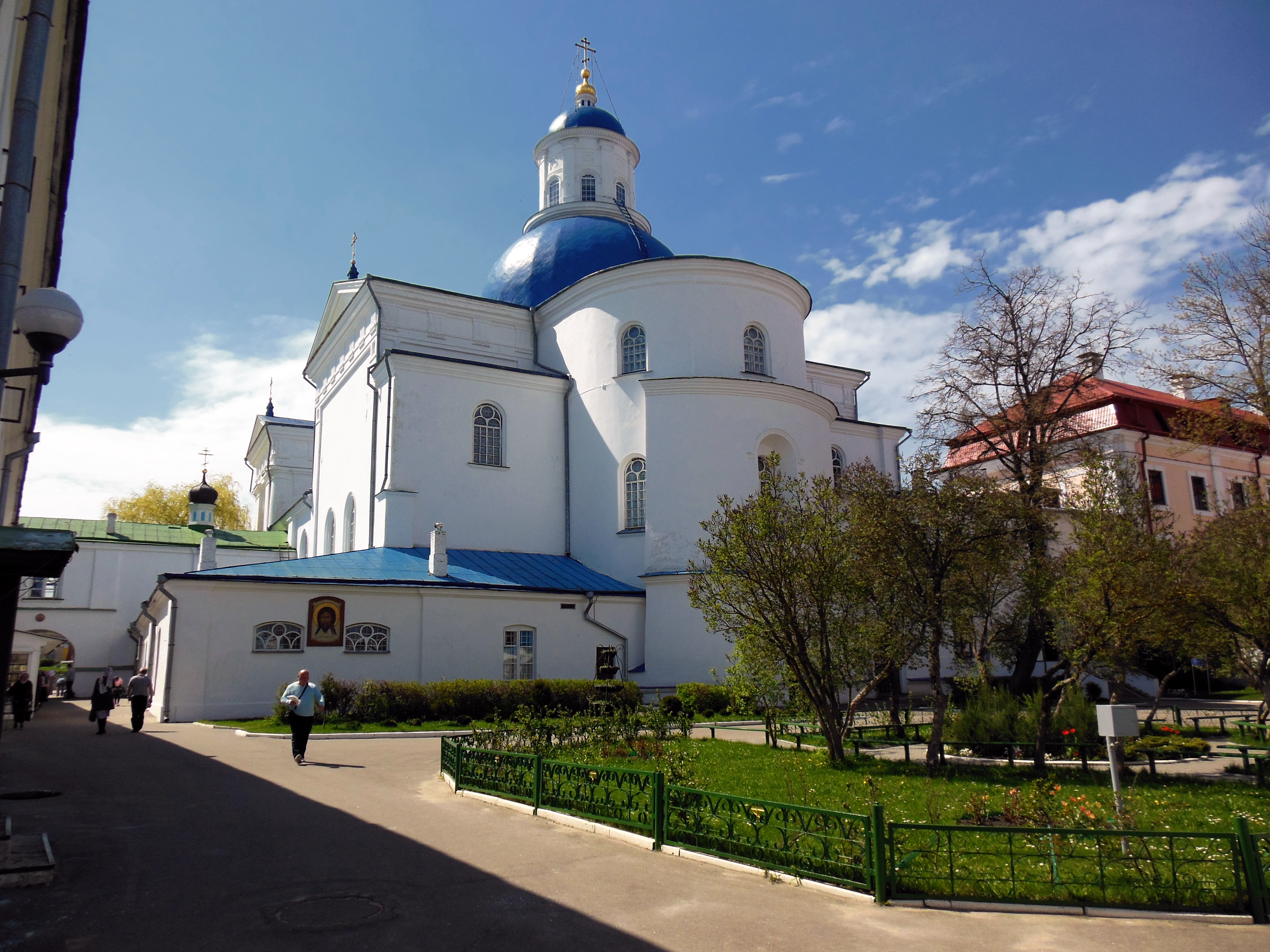

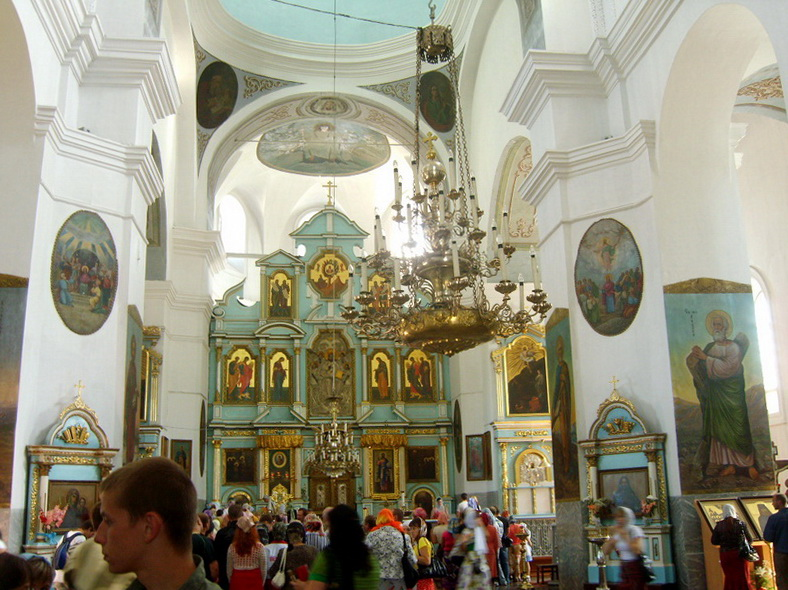

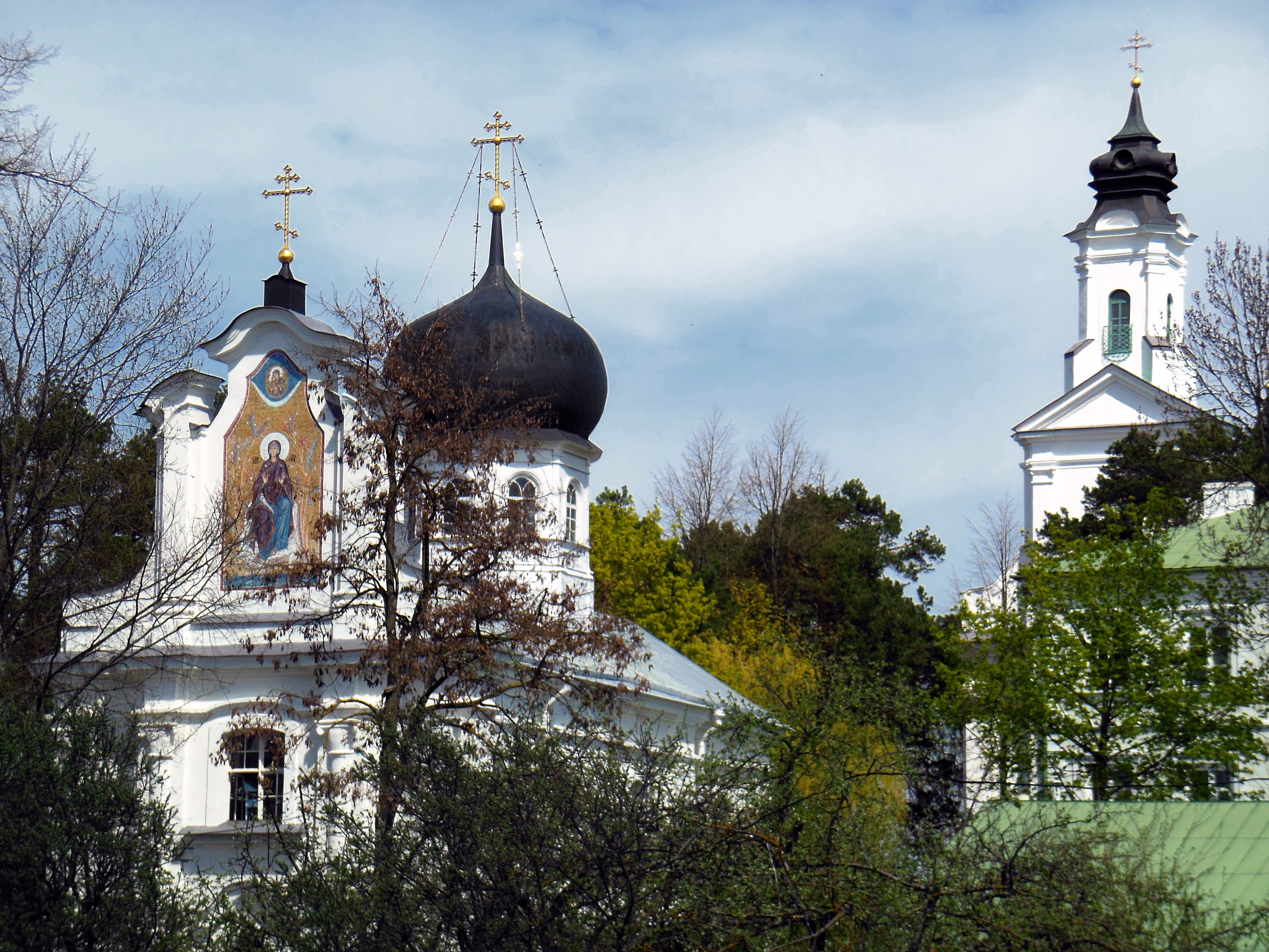

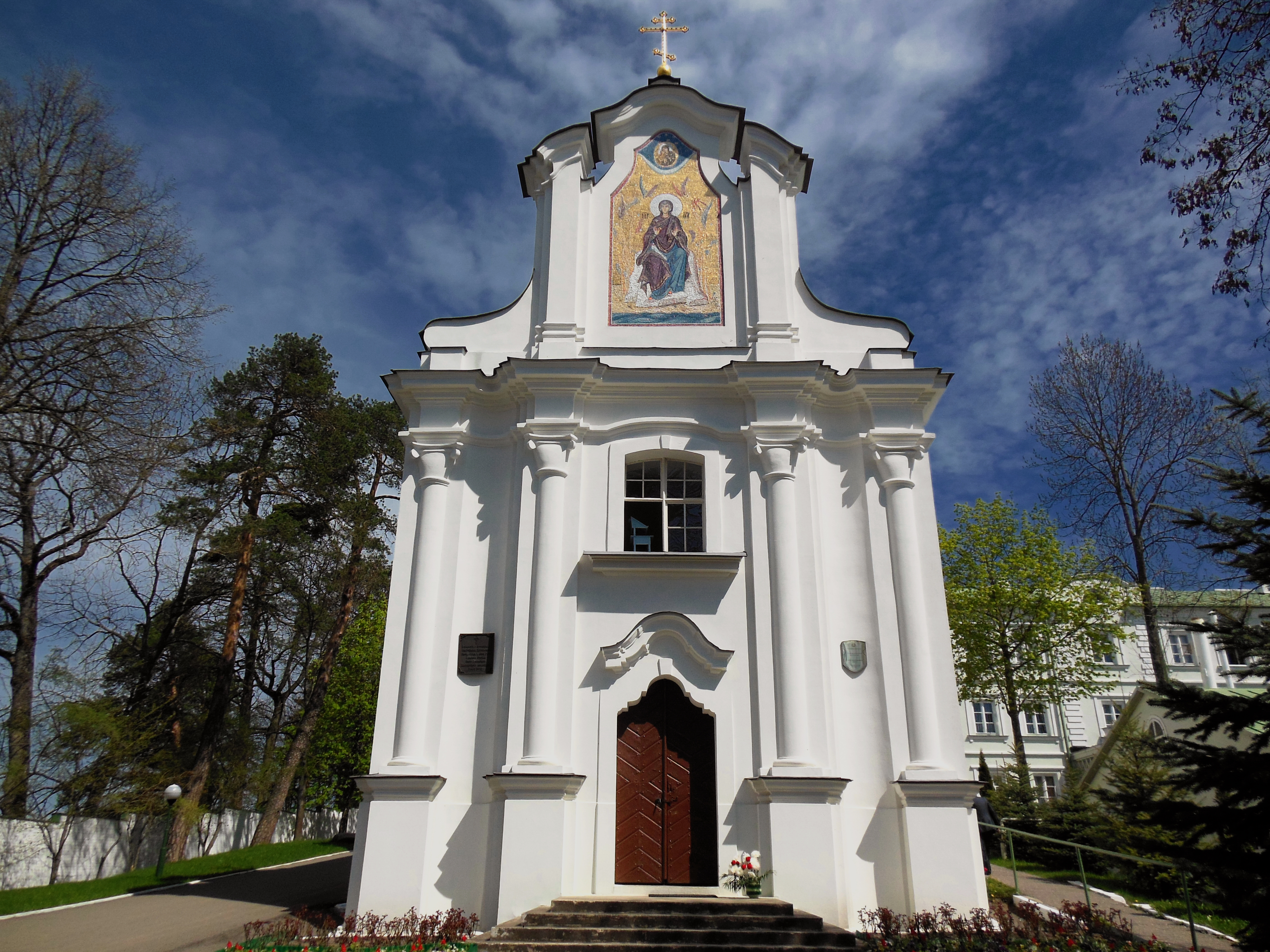

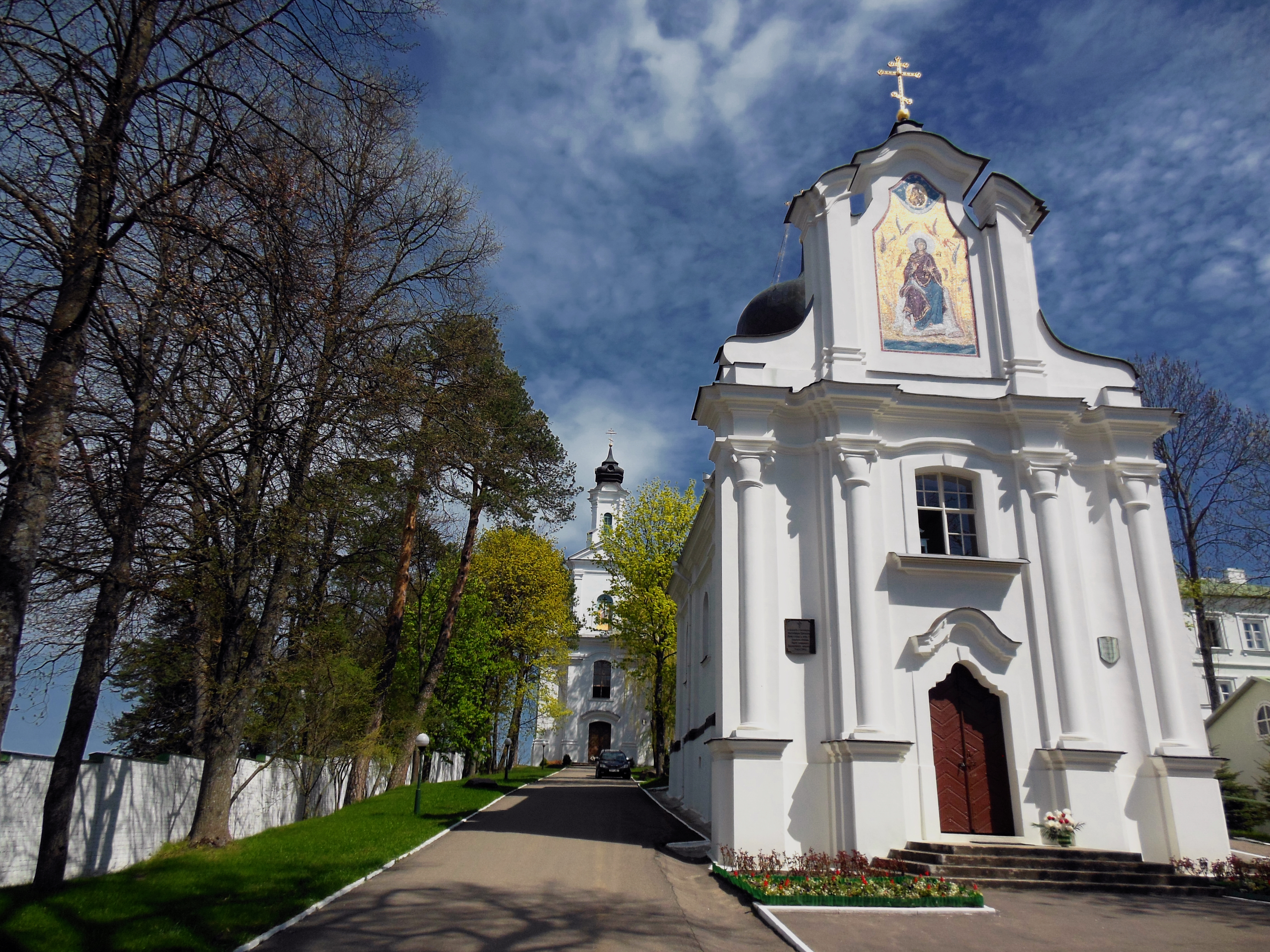

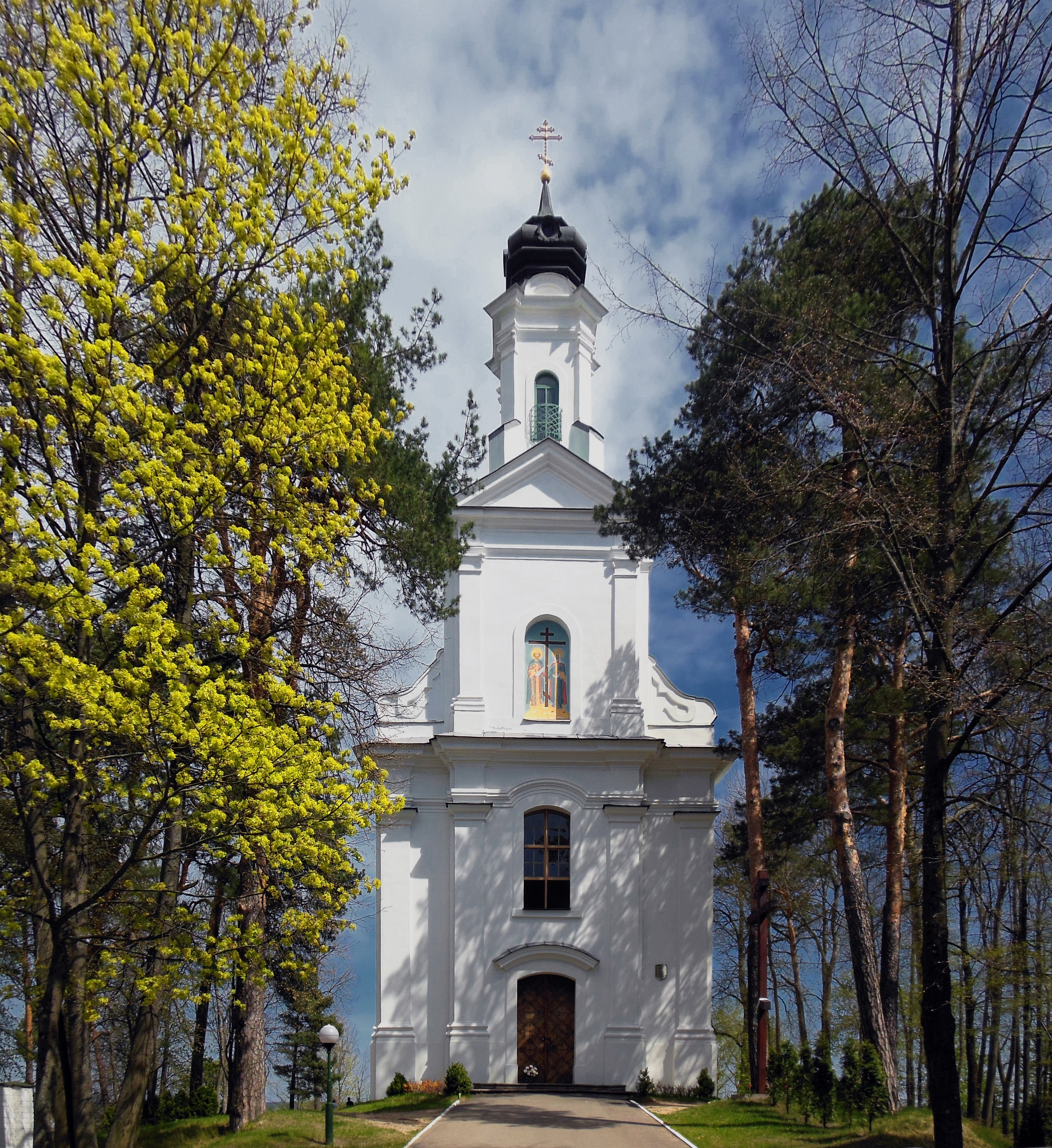

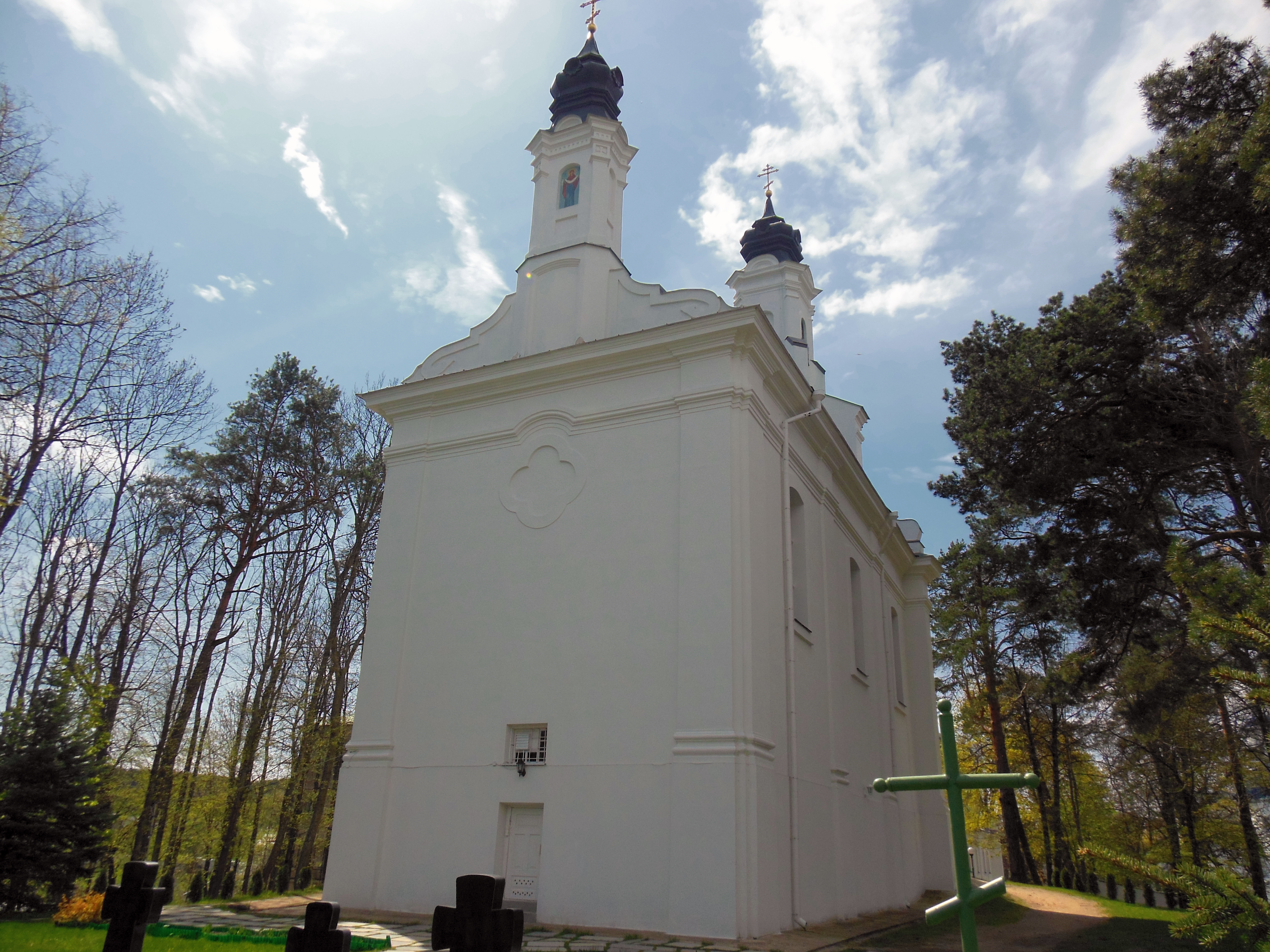

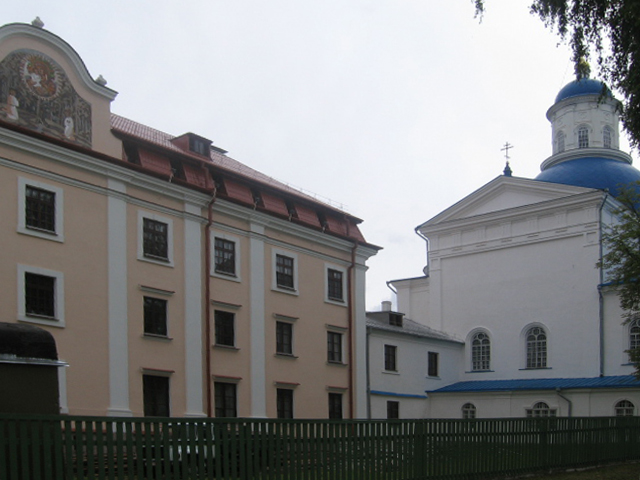

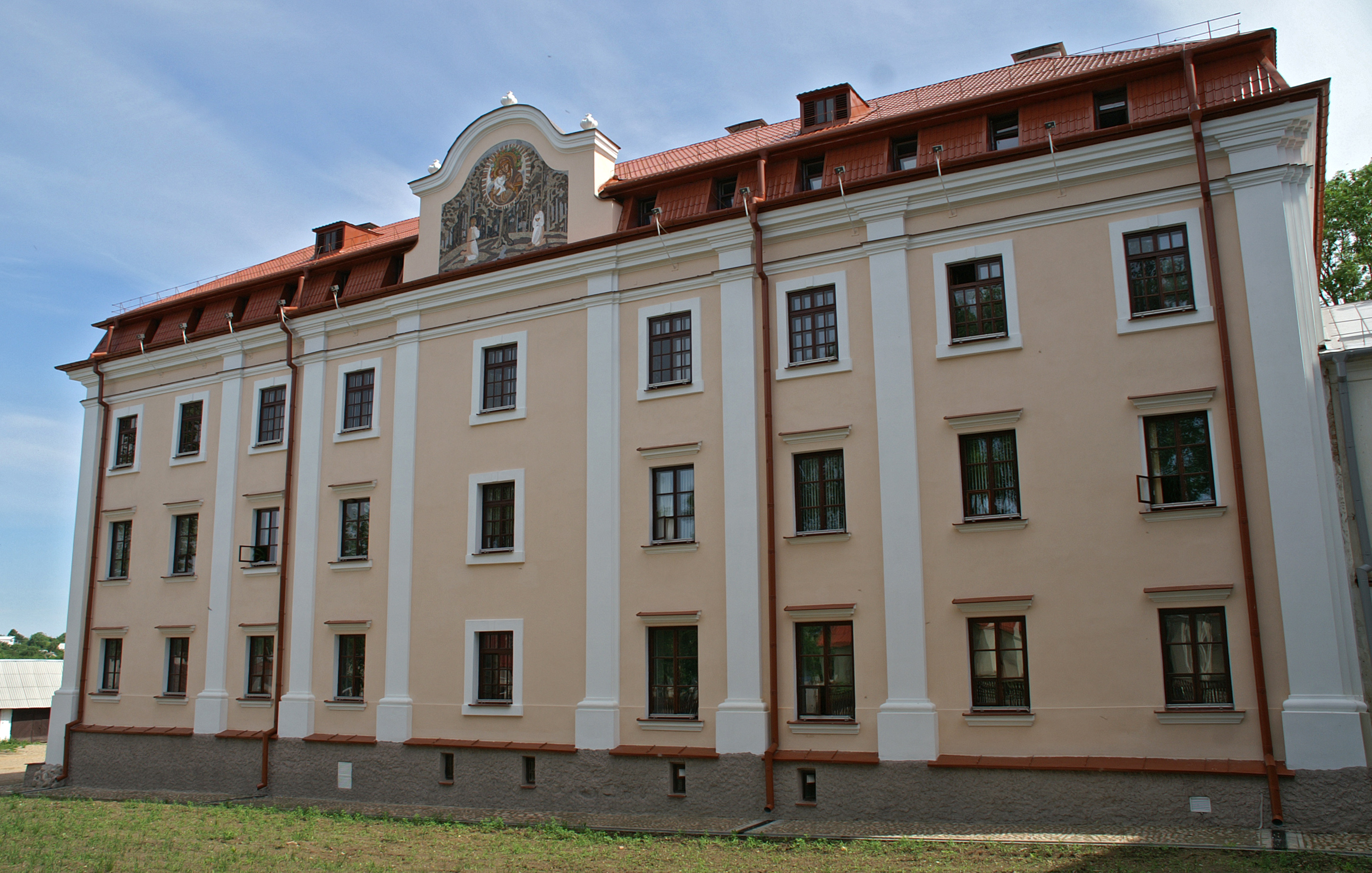

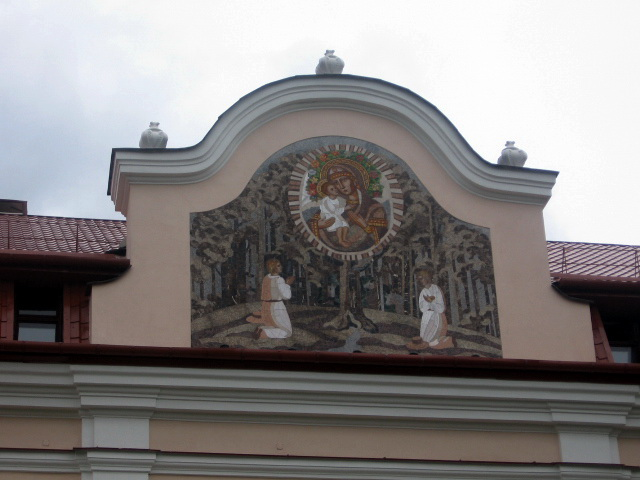

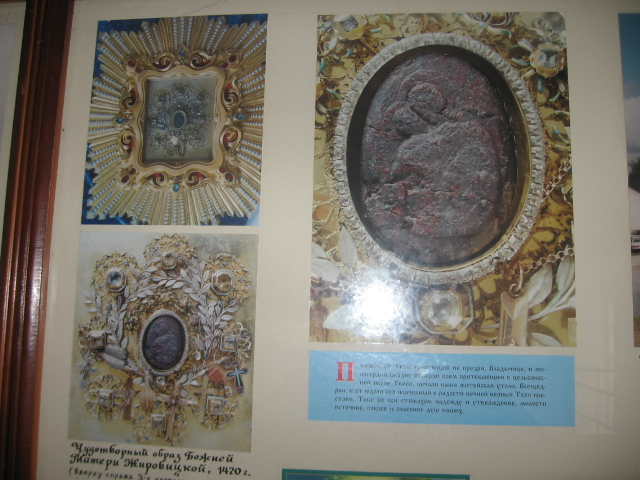

== See also ==
- Zhyrovichy Irmologion
