= Ruthenian Catholic Church =

Ruthenian Catholic Church may refer to:

- Ruthenian Uniate Church, a historical Eastern Catholic church during the early modern period
- Belarusian Greek Catholic Church, the modern branch of the Ruthenian Uniate Church based in Belarus
- Ukrainian Greek Catholic Church, the modern branch of the Ruthenian Uniate Church based in Ukraine
- Ruthenian Greek Catholic Church, an Eastern Catholic church currently operating in Subcarpathian Ukraine, Hungary, Slovakia, the Czech Republic, the United States, and Canada.

== See also ==
- Ruthenian Orthodox Church (disambiguation)
