= Russia (ship) =

Several ships have been named Russia, or a derivation:

- SS Russia (1867), a Cunard liner, later named Waesland
- SS Russia (1872), an iron-hulled American Great Lakes package freighter
- Russia (1876), also known as Eugenia Vesta, Canadian scow schooner
- SS Russian (1895), a British cargo ship, formerly the Victorian
- SS Russia, launched 1908, later SS Fuso Maru, a Japanese ocean liner
- Russia a Belgian ship wrecked on 21 December 1910
