= Rosia =

Rosia may refer to:

- Rosia (Ῥωσία), the Greek name for Rus' (region)
- Rosia, Sovicille, a village in Tuscany, Italy
- Roșia (disambiguation), villages in Romania
- Roșia Montană, a commune in Romania
- Roșia, a tributary of the river Dorna in Romania
- Rosia Airfield, a World War II military airfield
- Rosia Bay, the only natural harbour in Gibraltar
