= Novorossiya (rural locality) =

Novorossiya (airfield)
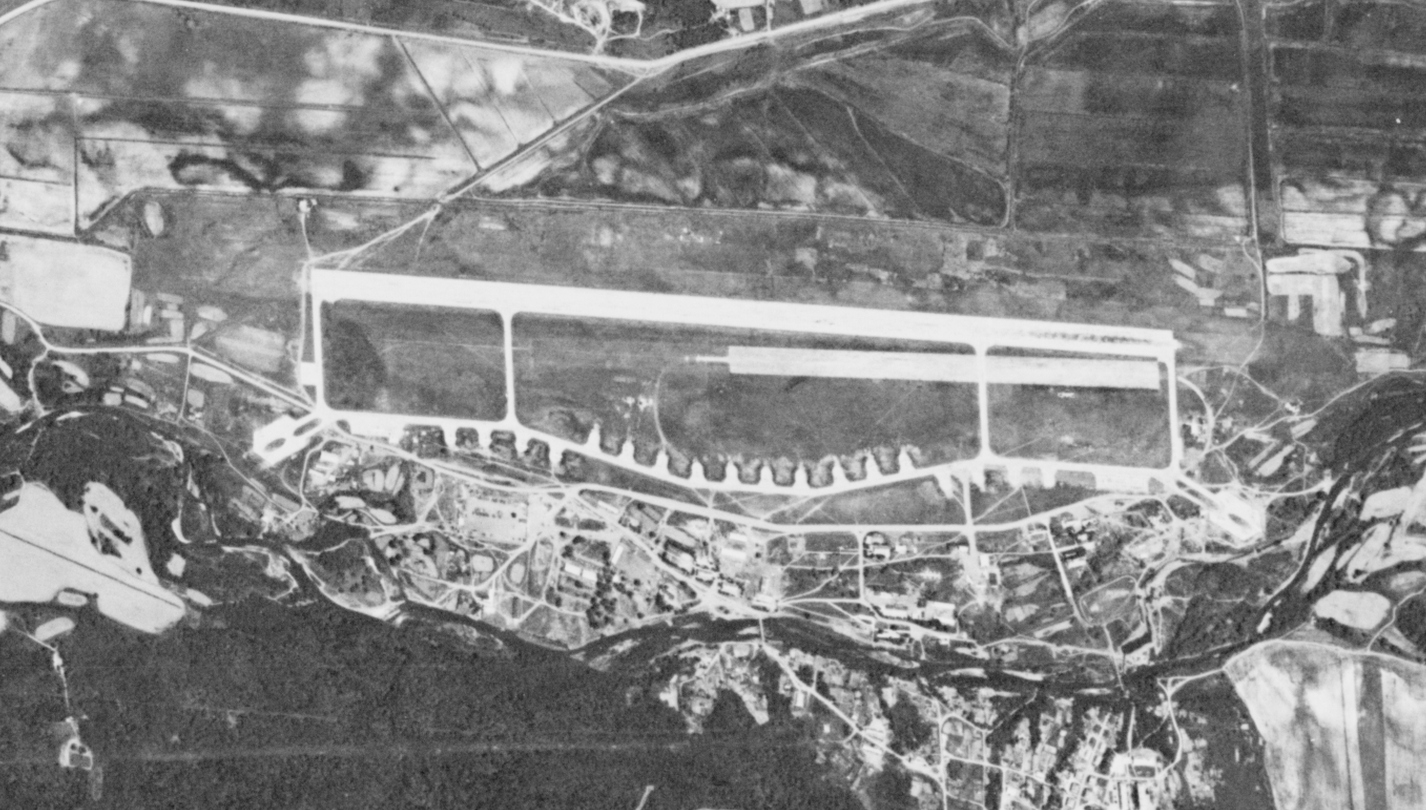
- Novorossiya, June 1970, from KH-4B satellite.
- IATA: none; ICAO: ZA99

Summary
- Airport type: Military
- Operator: Soviet Air Force
- Location: Primorsky Krai, Russia
- Elevation AMSL: 255 ft (78 m)
- Coordinates: 43°20′44″N 132°33′35″E
- Interactive map of Novorossiya (airfield)

Runways
Direction	Length		Surface
Direction	ft	m	Surface
09/27	6,560	2,000	Concrete

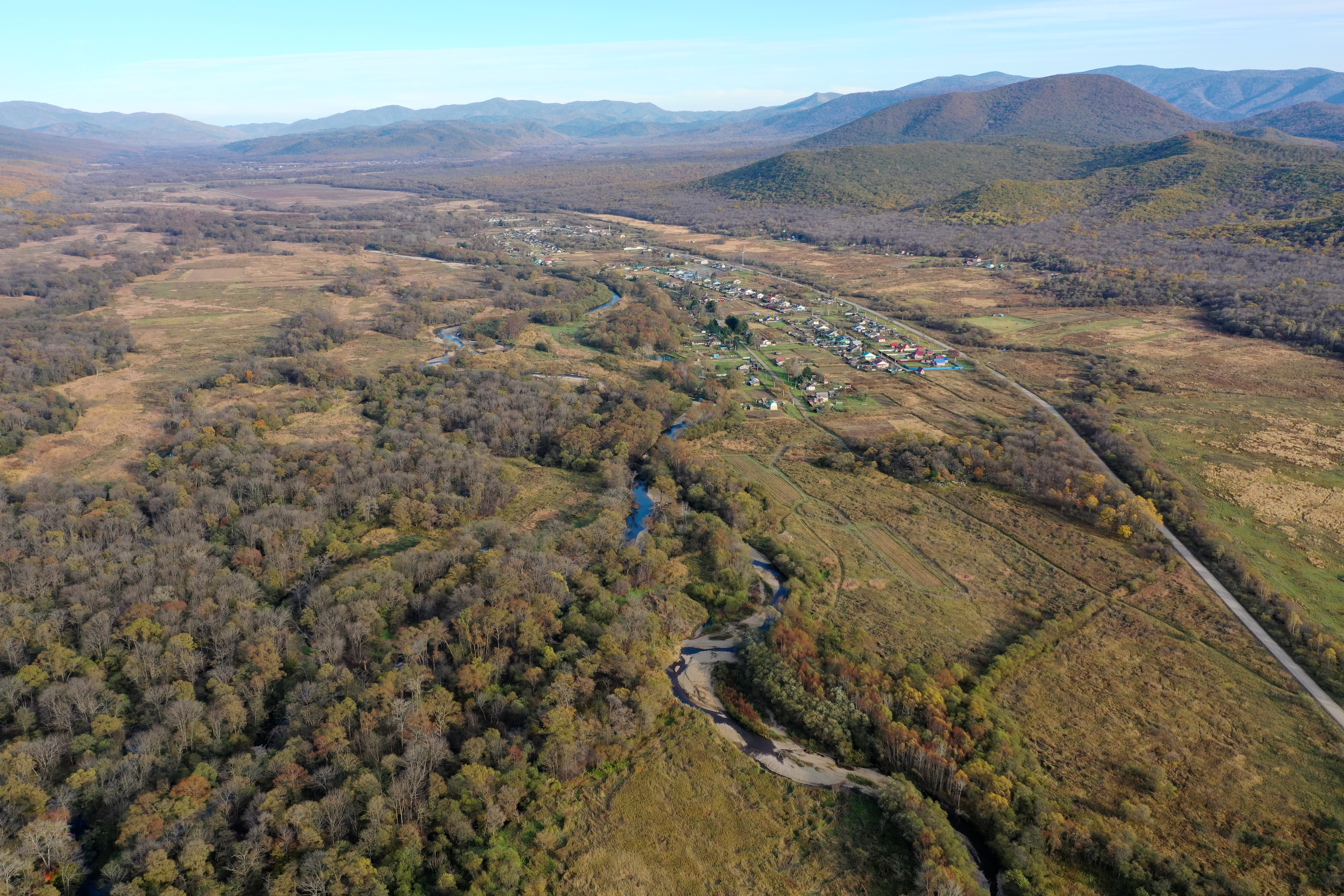
The community in 2019

Novorossiya (Russian: Новоро́ссия) is a rural locality (a selo) in Shkotovsky District of Primorsky Krai, Russia, located 82 kilometers (51 mi) from Vladivostok by road. Population: 479 (2010 census); 559 (2002 census);

It was founded in 1893 when fifteen families of settlers from Chernigov Governorate moved here. In 1894, additional fourteen families arrived. A church was built in 1901, and a parochial school opened in 1905. By 1910, the population grew to 414, mainly occupied with land cultivation, animal husbandry, and beekeeping.

In 1932, kolkhoz Pobeda (Victory) was established; it was later renamed Put k kommunizmu (Road to Communism). During World War II, sixty residents served in the army; only half of them returned after the war.

During the Cold War, a military airfield was constructed nearby, located 29 km (18 miles) east of Artyom.

From 1948 the 240th independent Observation and Reconnaissance Aviation Squadron occupied the airfield, then was upgraded into the 799th Independent Reconnaissance Aviation Regiment in 1967. It formed part of the 1st Air Army of the Far Eastern Military District. In 1967, satellite pictures showed a regiment of 34 Mikoyan-Gurevich MiG-15 (ASCC "Fagot") or MiG-17 Fresco at the airfield. Following an increase in tensions after the Sino-Soviet split the airfield was an operating location for the Ilyushin Il-28 Beagle, with as many as 25 aircraft based at the airfield. The regiment moved to Ozernaya Pad - Kremovo in 1975.

From 1960 to 1967 the 404th Fighter Aviation Regiment was at the airfield.

The airfield appears to have been without a tenant regiment since 1975.
