= Ruś =

Ruś may refer to the following places:

- Ruś, Podlaskie Voivodeship, a village in Łomża County, north-eastern Poland
- Ruś, Olsztyn County, a village in Warmian-Masurian Voivodeship, northern Poland
- Ruś, Ostróda County, a village in Warmian-Masurian Voivodeship, northern Poland
- Ruś, the Polish name for the Rus' (region) in Eastern Europe
- Ruthenia (disambiguation)
