= Novorossiya (disambiguation) =

Novorossiya was a historical region in the Russian Empire in the Southeastern Ukraine and the European part of modern Russia.

Novorossiya or New Russia may also refer to:

- New Russia (trading post), former Russian fur trading post on Yakutat Bay, Alaska in Russian America
- New Russia Township, Lorain County, Ohio
- Novorossiya (confederation), proposed confederation of separatist entities in Ukraine
  - New Russia Party, political party in Southeastern Ukraine
- Novorossiya Governorate, in the aforementioned historical region in the Russian Empire
- New Russia, hamlet south of Elizabethtown, New York
- Novorossiya (rural locality), rural locality in Primorsky Krai, Russia
- Novaya Russia, fictional civilization in Empire Earth
