= Carpatho-Ruthenian =

Carpatho-Ruthenian or Carpathian Ruthenian may refer to:

- something or someone related to Carpathian Ruthenia

Peoples:

- Carpatho-Ruthenian Rusyns - Rusyns from Carpathian Ruthenia
- Carpatho-Ruthenian Jews - Jews from Carpathian Ruthenia

Languages:

- Carpatho-Ruthenian dialects - an exonymic term for linguistic varieties of Rusyn and Ukrainian languages in the region of Carpathian Ruthenia

== See also ==
- Ruthenia (disambiguation)
- Ruthenian (disambiguation)
