= Rossiya (icebreaker) =

Two icebreakers have been named Rossiya, romanization of the Russian language word for "Russia" (Россия):

- Rossiya (1983 icebreaker), Arktika-class icebreaker launched in 1983 and retired in 2013
- The lead ship of Russian Project 10510 icebreakers will be named Rossiya
