= Russia! magazine =

Cover of Russia! (Summer 2007). Designed by Art. Lebedev Studio

Russia! magazine was an English-language publication about Russia, published quarterly by US-based company Press Release Group.

The first issue, released in February 2007, had 132 pages and its topics ranged from homosexuality to the issue of free speech. It was distributed in the US, UK and Russia. Design and art-direction of the first issue of the magazine was done by Art. Lebedev Studio.

The magazine was distributed in the US, UK, Sweden, Russia and around the world. It was sold in Barnes & Noble stores, Borders and other locations.

It was named one of the best new magazines of 2007 by Library Journal. Russia! magazine was published online until 2016.

== History ==
Russia! magazine was founded in 2007 by Ilya Merenzon and Andrew Paulson. The founding editor, Michael Thompson, was replaced after a single issue with Michael Idov, a contributing editor at New York Magazine. Under Idov, 'Russia!' took on a more humorous sensibility.
