= Ruthenian Orthodox Church =

Ruthenian Orthodox Church may refer to:

- an exonymic designation for Eastern Orthodox ecclesiastical jurisdictions among Eastern Slavs, during the late medieval and early modern periods, including:
  - the medieval and early modern Metropolis of Kiev and all Rus' (Eastern Orthodox)
  - the late medieval Metropolis of Halych (Eastern Orthodox)
  - the late medieval Metropolis of Lithuania (Eastern Orthodox)
- Ruthenian Orthodox Church in Ukraine, an exonymic designation for early modern Eastern Orthodox Church, on the territory of Ukraine
- Belarusian Orthodox Church, an exonymic designation for the semi-automomous church of the Russian Orthodox Church, on the territory of Belarus

== See also ==
- Ruthenian Catholic Church (disambiguation)
