= Ruthenian =

Ruthenian or Ruthene may refer to:

== Places ==
- Ruthenia, a name applied to various East Slavic inhabited lands
  - White Ruthenia, an East Slavic historical region
  - Black Ruthenia, an East Slavic historical region
  - Red Ruthenia, an East Slavic historical region
  - Carpathian Ruthenia, a historical region inhabited mostly by Rusyns (Rusynia)
  - Ruthenian Voivodeship, a historical province (1434–1772)

== Peoples ==
- Ruthenians, an exonymic name applied to various East Slavic peoples (Gente Ruthenus, natione Polonus):
  - Belarusians, sometimes referred to (in historical context) as White Ruthenians
  - Rusyns, sometimes referred to as Carpatho-Ruthenians
    - Pannonian Rusyns
  - Ukrainians, sometimes referred to (in historical context) as South Ruthenians

== Languages ==
- Old East Slavic, language of the medieval Rus' (sometimes referred to as Old Ruthenian)
- Ruthenian language, East Slavic language of the Grand Duchy of Lithuania, the Polish-Lithuanian Commonwealth and the Habsburg Monarchy
  - Belarusian language, sometimes referred to (in historical context) as White Ruthenian
  - Rusyn language, sometimes referred to as Carpatho-Ruthenian
    - Pannonian Rusyn, sometimes referred to as Ruthenian
  - Ukrainian language, sometimes referred to (in historical context) as Ruthenian or South Ruthenian

== Religion ==
- Ruthenian Rite, an exonymic designation for the East Slavic form of the Byzantine Rite
- Ruthenian Catholic Church (historical), that existed from the 15th to the 18th century
- Ruthenian Byzantine Catholic Church, one of the 23 particular (sui iuris) Eastern Catholic Churches

== Other ==
- Ruthenian nobility, East Slavic nobility of the Polish-Lithuanian Commonwealth and the Habsburg Monarchy
- Minerals containing the element ruthenium

== See also ==
- Ruthenia (disambiguation)
- Ruthenian Americans (disambiguation)
- Rusyn (disambiguation)
