= Black Ruthenia =

Name given to various historical regions in Eastern Europe

Black Ruthenia (Latin: Ruthenia Nigra), or Black Rus' (Belarusian: Чорная Русь, romanized: Čornaja Ruś; Lithuanian: Juodoji Rusia; Polish: Ruś Czarna), is a historical region on the Upper Neman, including Novogrudok, Grodno and Slonim. Besides these, other important parts of Black Rus' are Vawkavysk and Białystok. The region was inhabited by the Baltic Yotvingians from ancient times and the name "Black Russia" appeared relatively late.

On a 1712 map by Henri Chatelain, "Russie noire" (Black Ruthenia) is placed in region of Eastern Galicia (today Western Ukraine), which is traditionally known as "Russie rouge" (Red Ruthenia).

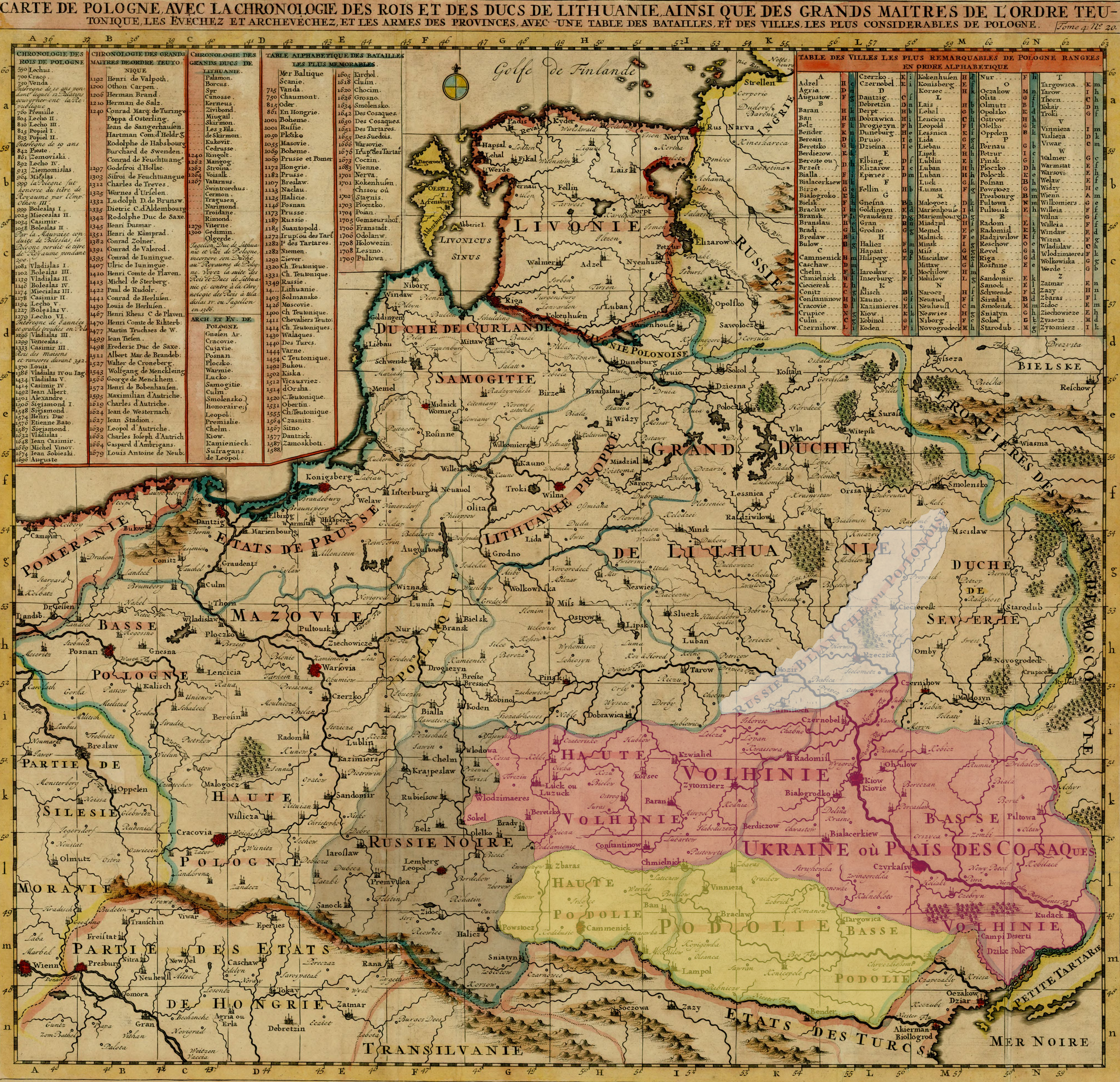
A case of Black Ruthenia being shown in Ukraine on a 1712 map of French cartographer Henri Chatelain

== History ==
The convention of distinguishing different Ruthenian regions by colours was first done by Medieval Western and Central European historians from the 14th to 17th centuries. The earliest known use, around 1360, is in the chronicle of Hungary by Heinrich von Mügeln, whose legendary account of Attila's campaigns mentions the "land of the black Ruthenians" (das land der swarczen reussen). Some researchers claim that this color naming convention was influenced by the Mongol invaders, who used them for the cardinal directions.

Sometimes in the 16th century, the names Black, White and Red Ruthenia were given respectively to the Grand Duchy of Moscow, the Grand Duchy of Lithuania, and Lithuanian-owned Ruthenian lands that were given to Poland during the Union of Lublin.

According to Bancks' book from 1813, Black Russia was composed of the Governorates of Kaluga, Moscow, Tula, Ryazan, Vladimir and Yaroslav.

According to Alfred Nicolas Rambaud in the late 19th century:

The Lithuanian territories of Grodno, Novogrodek and Belostok were sometimes called Black Russia.

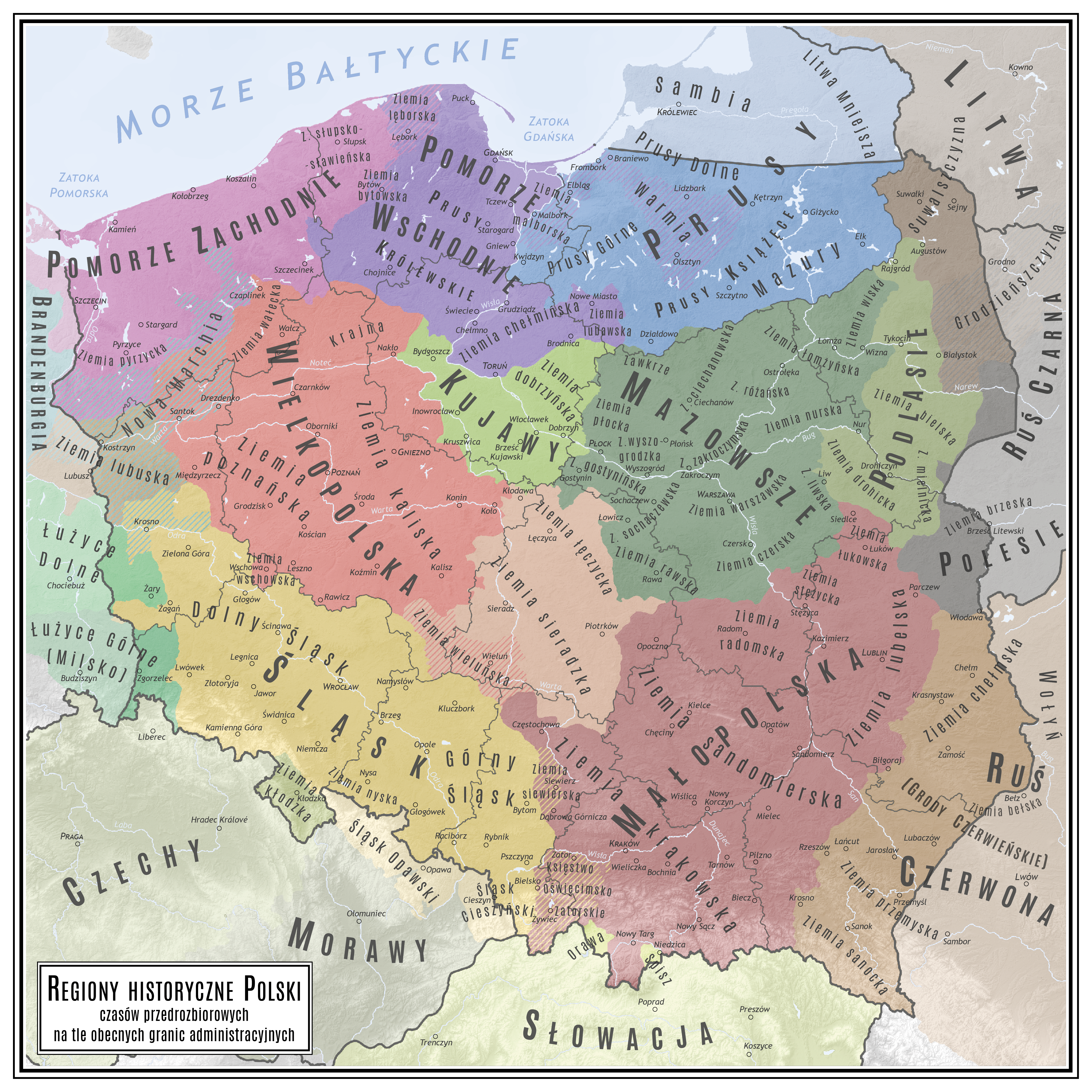
See "Rus Czarna" marked by the eastern border

On some Polish maps "Black Ruthenia" (Rus Czarna) covered areas of modern Belarus, which were labeled "White Ruthenia" on other maps.

== See also ==
- Ruthenia
- Red Ruthenia
- White Ruthenia
- Carpathian Ruthenia
