= White Ruthenia =

Archaic name for a historical region in Belarus

White Ruthenia, also known as White Rus' or White Russia (Belarusian: Белая Русь, romanized: Biełaja Ruś; Polish: Ruś Biała; Russian: Белая Русь, romanized: Belaya Rus'; Ukrainian: Біла Русь, romanized: Bila Ruś; Yiddish: רייסן, romanized: Raysn), is one of the historical divisions of Kievan Rus' according to the color scheme, which also includes Black and Red Ruthenia. In the late Middle Ages and early modern period, the name White Ruthenia was characterized by instability, designating a number of different regions on the territory of modern-day Belarus, Russia, and Ukraine. It is recorded mainly in Western European sources, starting from the middle of the 13th century.

== History ==
Vasily Tatishchev held that the first use of the term "White Rus'" is found in the Rostov chronicles from the year 1135, where the lands of Rostov-Suzdal Principality were mentioned. Referring to the publications of the Pole Maciej Stryjkowski, Persian and other Eastern peoples who called the Russian princes "ak-padishah"(white tsar), and the state "Ak-Urus" (White Rus), the historian in his narrative extends this name to all Vladimir-Rostov princes, starting with Yuri Dolgorukiy, and Andrei Bogolyubsky. He also calls the lands controlled by them "White Rus'", and calls the princes "White Russians" or "grand dukes of White Russia".

The praiseworthy songs composed in the second half of the 14th century by the Austrian poet Peter Suchenwirt tell how in 1349, in the battle of Izborsk ("Eysenburk" in the poem), German knights faced "Weizzen Reuzzen" ("White Russians"). However, it is known that it was a squad of Pskov and Izborsk people, led by Georgy Viktorovich, voivode of the Grand Duke of Lithuania Algirdas.

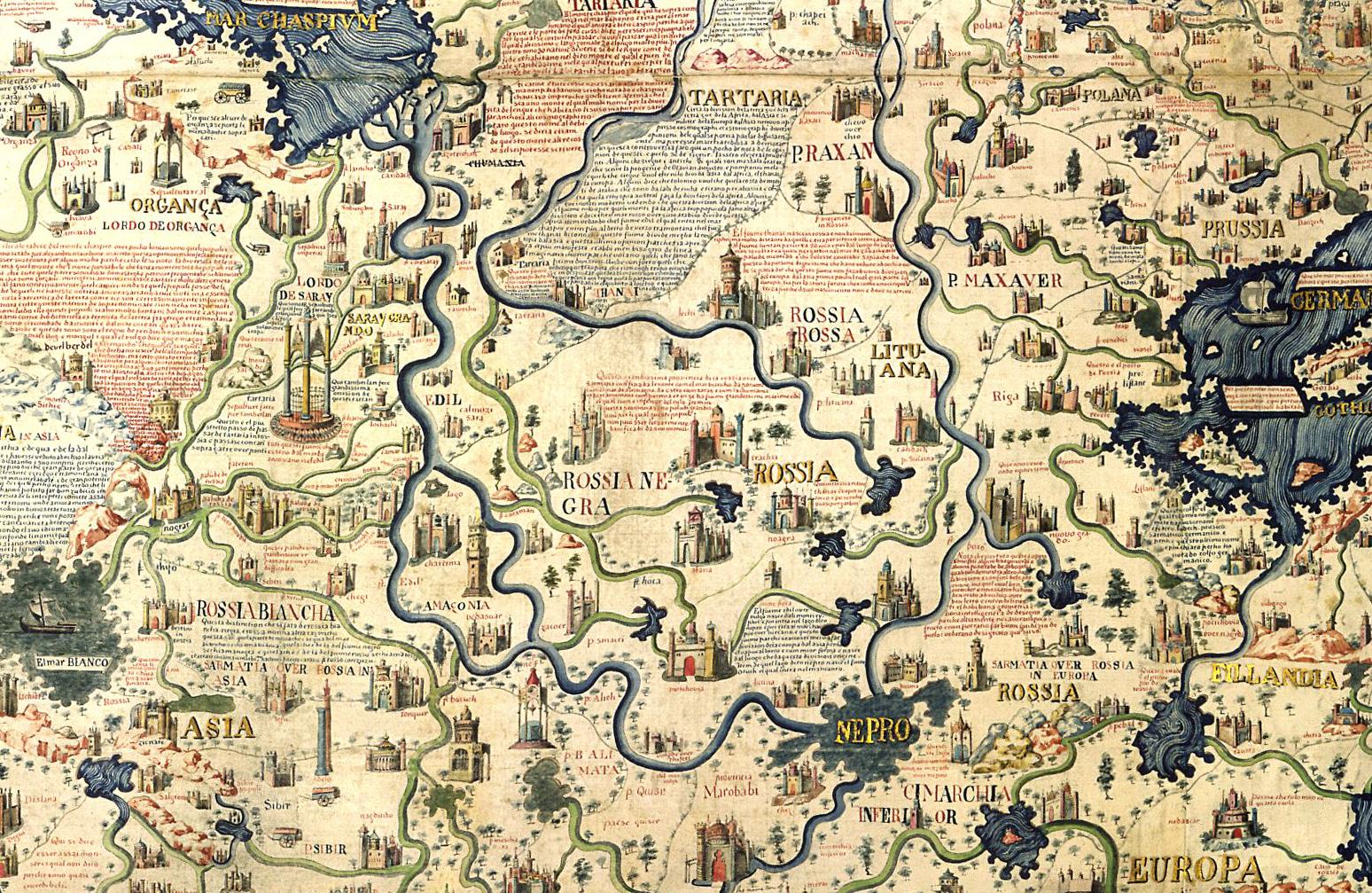
On Fra Mauro's map (1459), oriented south, White Rus' (Rossia Biancha) is located near the White Sea (El mar bianco)

On the world Fra Mauro map (1459), the territory of Novgorod-Moscow Rus' between Volga and White Sea is called White Russia (Rossia Biancha). This map gives the following explanation:

This distinction, which is made between White, Black and Red Rus' has no other reason than that that part of Russia that is near the White Sea is called White; that which is near the Black River is called Black; and that which is near the Red River is called Red. (Questa distinction che si fata de rossia biancha, negra e rossa non ha altra cason cha questa, çoè quela parte de rossia che é de qua dal mar biancho se chiama biancha, quela ch'ê de là dal fiume negro se chiama negra e quela ch'ê de là dal fiume rosso se chiama rossa).

Many other variations of this name appeared on ancient maps; for instance, Russia Alba, Russija Alba, Wit Rusland, Weiß Reußen (Weißreußen), White Russia, Hviterussland, Hvíta Rússland, Weiß Russland (Weißrussland), Ruthenia Alba, Ruthénie Blanche and Weiß Ruthenien (Weißruthenien). The name was also assigned to various territories, often quite distant from that of present Belarus.

According to Alfred Nicolas Rambaud:

The name of White (Lithuanian: Balta) Russia is given to the provinces conquered from the 13th to the 14th century by the Grand Dukes of Lithuania. These were the ancient territories of the Krivitches, Polotchans, Dregovitches, Drevlians, Doulebes, now forming the governments of Vitepsk, Mohilef, and Minsk. The Lithuanian territories of Grodno, Novogrodek and Belostok were sometimes called Black Russia.

An ethno-religious theory suggests that the name used to describe the part of old Ruthenian lands within the Grand Duchy of Lithuania that had been populated mostly by Slavs who had been Christianized early, as opposed to Black Ruthenia, which was predominantly inhabited by pagan Balts.

As stated by historian Andrej Kotljarchuk, the first person who called himself "Belarusian" was Calvinist writer Salomon Rysinski (Solomo Pantherus Leucorussus, ca 1569–1626). According to his words, he was born "in richly endowed with forests and animals Ruthenia near the border to frigid Muscovy" and doctorated at the University of Altdorf.

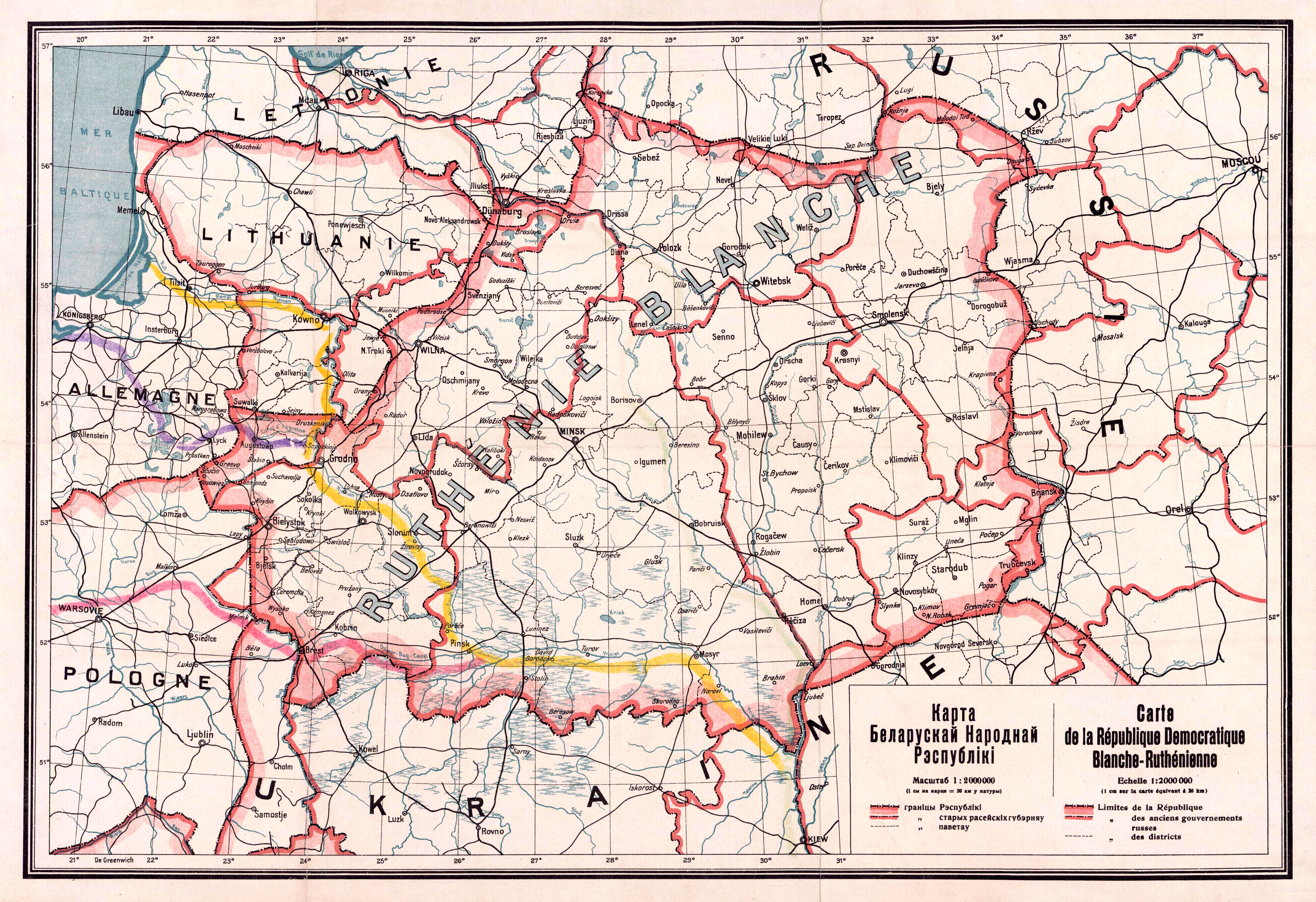
1918 map of the Belarusian (White Ruthenian) Democratic Republic in French

On the 1712 map of French cartographer Henri Chatelain "Russie noire" (Black Ruthenia) is placed in region of Eastern Galicia (today Western Ukraine), which traditionally known as "Russie rouge" (Red Ruthenia).

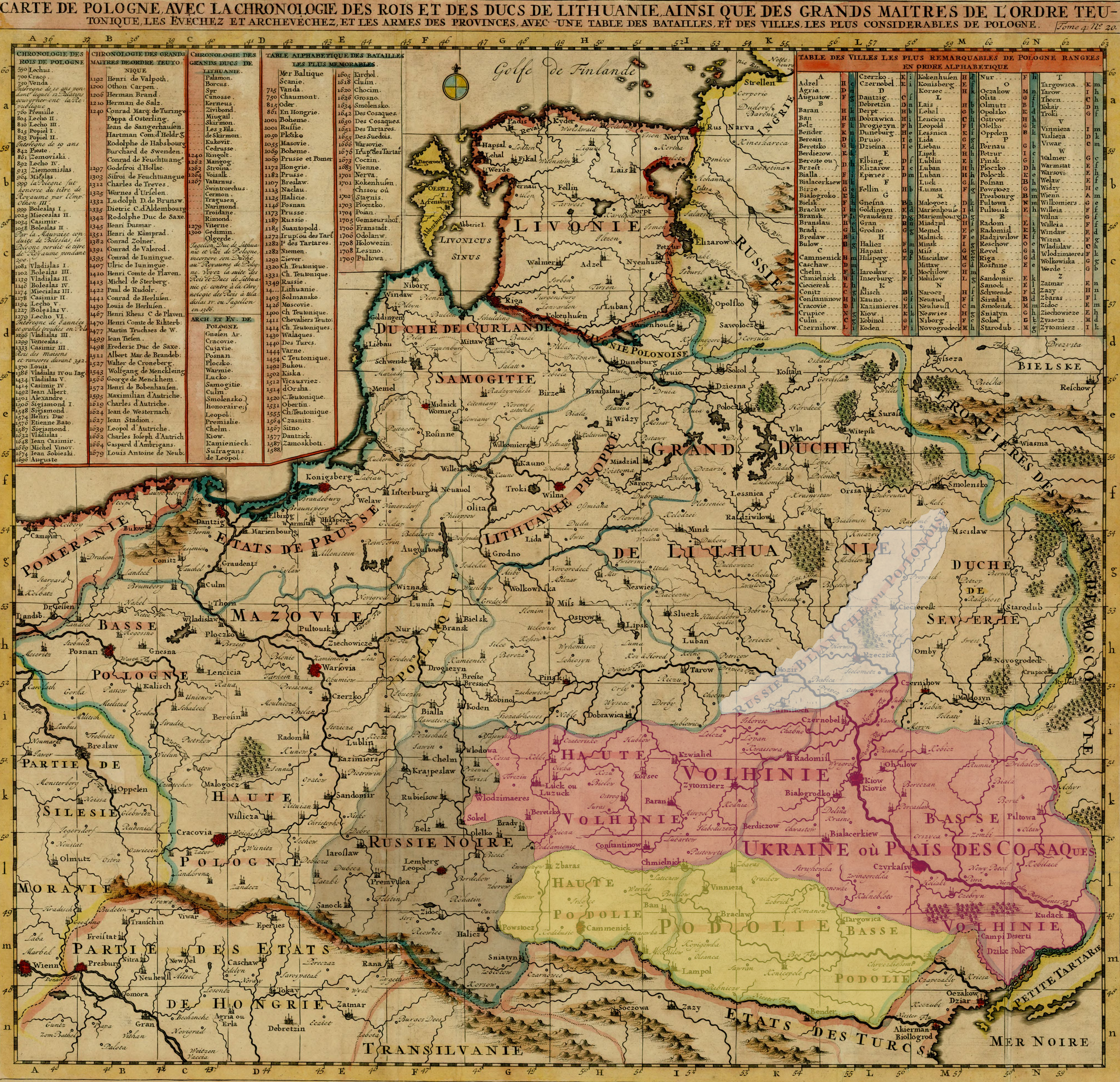
White Ruthenia (French: Russie Blanche) in white on a map by French cartographer Henri Chatelain in 1712. Black Ruthenia in black, Volhynia in red, and Podolia in yellow.

Max Vasmer's etymological dictionary mentions Alexander Potebnja's suggestion that White Rus' originally meant "free Rus', independent of the Tatars", which Vladimir Lamansky rejected, but compares the opposition of "white" and "taxed" land in the Domostroy. Vasmer himself thought it most likely that the name came from the light hair and white clothing of the population. In his additions to the Russian edition of the dictionary, Oleg Trubachyov called a different explanation, put forward by Krapivin in 1956, "completely fantastic".

Also, the 16th century chronicler Alexander Guagnini's book Sarmatiae Europeae descriptio wrote that Rus' was divided in three parts. The first part, under the rule of the Muscovite Grand Duke, was called White Ruthenia. The second one, under the rule of Polish king, was called Black Ruthenia. And the rest was Red Ruthenia. He also said Moscow was the center of White Rus' and the Russian metropolitanate, and that the Grand Duke of Moscow was called the White Czar, especially by his subjects.

According to the late 19th-century Geographical Dictionary of the Kingdom of Poland, White Ruthenia (Ruś Biała) constituted the Minsk, Mścisław, Połock, Smolensk and Witebsk voivodeships of the Polish–Lithuanian Commonwealth (before the Partitions of Poland), or the Mogilev Governorate, eastern parts of the Minsk and Vitebsk Governorates, the western half of the Smolensk Governorate, and the northern part of the Chernihiv Governorate, i.e. the central, northern and eastern parts of modern Belarus, and the western outskirts of modern Russia with Smolensk and Starodub. The largest cities in the region so defined today are Minsk, Gomel, Vitebsk, Mogilev, Smolensk and Babruysk.

== See also ==
- Black Ruthenia
- Red Ruthenia
- Little Russia
- Great Russia
- New Russia
