= Ruthenia (disambiguation) =

Ruthenia may refer to:

- Ruthenia, a name applied to various East Slavic lands
  - Red Ruthenia, an East Slavic historical region
  - Black Ruthenia, an East Slavic historical region
  - White Ruthenia, an East Slavic historical region
- Carpathian Ruthenia, an East Slavic region (Rusynia) on the both sides of Carpathian Mountains
  - Inner Carpathian Ruthenia, sub-region of Carpathian Ruthenia on the inner side of Carpathian Mountains
  - Outer Carpathian Ruthenia, sub-region of Carpathian Ruthenia on the outer side of Carpathian Mountains
  - Subcarpathian Ruthenia, relative term, most commonly used for the Inner Carpathian Ruthenia
  - Ciscarpathian Ruthenia, relative term, most commonly used for the Outer Carpathian Ruthenia
  - Transcarpathian Ruthenia, relative term, used in different geographical contexts, depending on a point of observation
- Kingdom of Ruthenia, an East Slavic kingdom in the 13th century
- Voivodeship of Ruthenia, a province of the early modern Kingdom of Poland
- Grand Principality of Ruthenia (1658), a proposed state (1658)
- Ruthenium oxide, via the *-ia terminology for metal oxides

== See also ==
- Ruthenian (disambiguation)
- Russia (disambiguation)
- Rus (disambiguation)
- Ruś (disambiguation)
